= 2016 Pacific hurricane season =

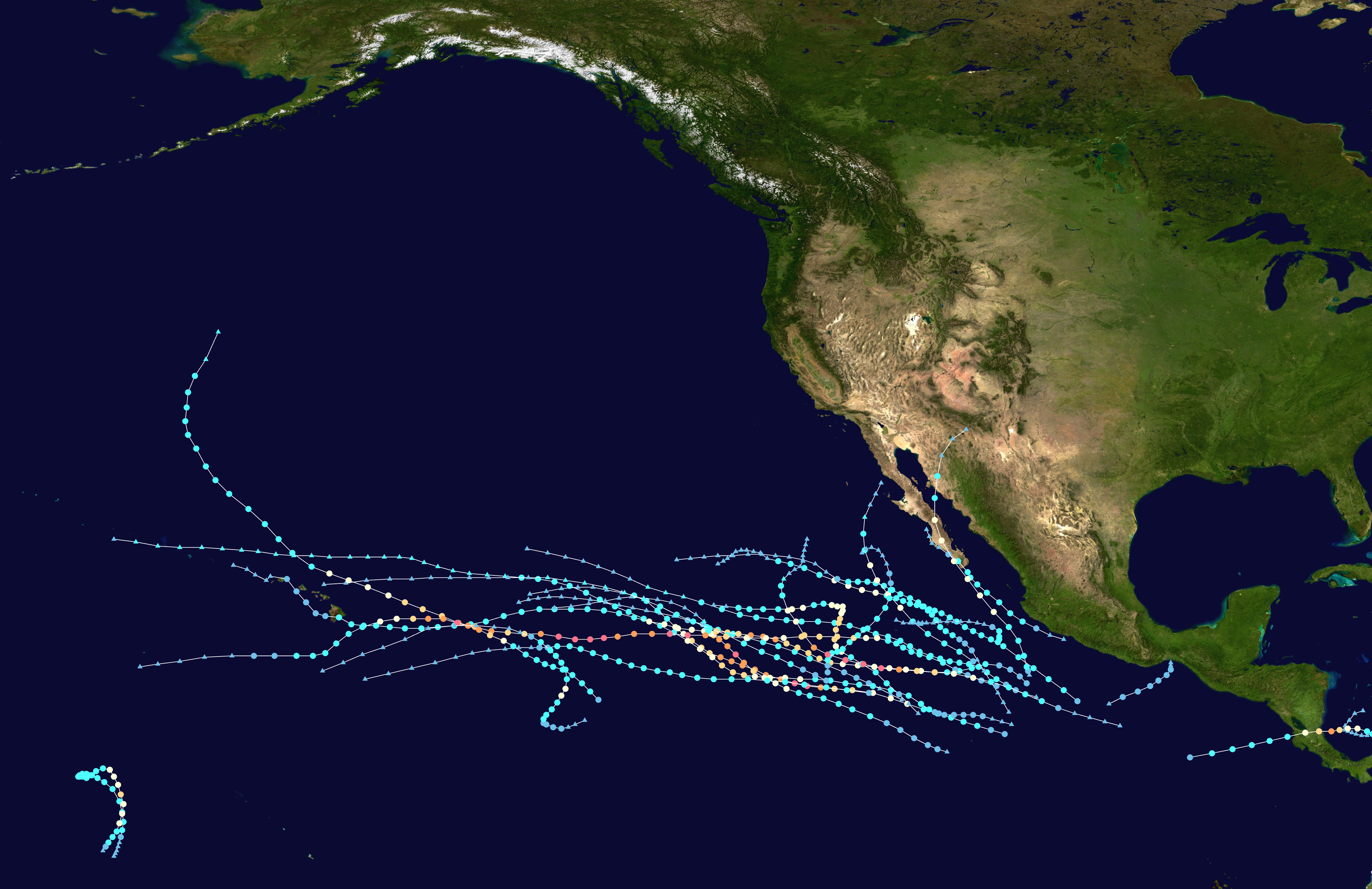
- Season summary map

Seasonal boundaries
- First system formed: January 7, 2016 (record earliest)
- Last system dissipated: November 26, 2016 (Note: Atlantic-crossover Tropical Storm Otto dissipated on this day. The last East Pacific hurricane, Tropical Storm Tina, dissipated on November 14.)

Strongest storm
- Name: Seymour
  - Maximum winds: 150 mph (240 km/h) (1-minute sustained)
  - Lowest pressure: 940 mbar (hPa; 27.76 inHg)

Seasonal statistics
- Total depressions: 23
- Total storms: 22
- Hurricanes: 13
- Major hurricanes (Cat. 3+): 6
- ACE: 184.8
- Total fatalities: 18 total
- Total damage: $95.8 million (2016 USD)

Related articles
- Timeline of the 2016 Pacific hurricane season; 2016 Atlantic hurricane season; 2016 Pacific typhoon season; 2016 North Indian Ocean cyclone season

The 2016 Pacific hurricane season was tied as the fifth-most active Pacific hurricane season on record, alongside the 2014 season. Throughout the course of the year, a total of 22 named storms, 13 hurricanes and six major hurricanes were observed within the basin. Although the season was very active, it was considerably less active than the previous season, with large gaps of inactivity at the beginning and towards the end of the season. It officially started on May 15 in the Eastern Pacific (north of the Equator and east 140°W), and on June 1 in the Central Pacific (from 140°W to the International Date Line); they both ended on November 30. These dates conventionally delimit the period of each year when most tropical cyclones form in these regions of the Pacific Ocean. However, tropical development is possible at any time of the year, as demonstrated by the formation of Hurricane Pali on January 7, the earliest Central Pacific tropical cyclone on record. After Pali, however, no tropical cyclones developed in either region until a short-lived depression on June 6. Also, there were no additional named storms until July 2, when Tropical Storm Agatha formed, becoming the latest first-named Eastern Pacific tropical storm since Tropical Storm Ava in 1969.

Hurricane Darby brushed the Hawaiian islands as a tropical storm causing only minor damage; while hurricanes Lester and Madeline also threatened to make landfall in Hawaii but weakened significantly before approaching the islands. Tropical Storm Javier and Hurricane Newton both made landfall in Mexico, with the latter being responsible for at least nine fatalities as it came ashore near Baja California Sur. Hurricane Ulika was a rare and erratic storm which zig-zagged across 140°W a total of three times. Hurricane Seymour became the strongest storm of the season, forming in late October. Finally, in late November, Hurricane Otto from the Atlantic made an unusual crossing over Central America, emerging into the East Pacific as a moderate tropical storm but dissipated shortly after. Damage across the basin reached $95 million (2016 USD), while 11 people were killed by Celia and Newton overall.

== Seasonal forecasts ==
Record		Named storms	Hurricanes	Major hurricanes	Ref
Average (1981–2010):		15.4	7.6	3.2	
Record high activity:		1992: 27	2015: 16	2015: 11	
Record low activity:		2010: 8	2010: 3	2003: 0	
Date	Source	Named storms	Hurricanes	Major hurricanes	Ref
May 6, 2016	SMN	10	7	3	
May 27, 2016	NOAA	13–20	6–11	3–6	
	Area	Named storms	Hurricanes	Major hurricanes	Ref
Actual activity:	EPAC	20	11	6	
Actual activity:	CPAC	2	2	0	
Actual activity:		22	13	6	

On May 6, 2016, the Servicio Meteorológico Nacional (SMN) issued its first outlook for the Pacific hurricane season, forecasting a below average season with 10 named storms, 7 hurricanes, and 3 major hurricanes. On May 27, NOAA released their outlook, forecasting 13-20 named storms, 6-11 hurricanes, and 3-6 major hurricanes. NOAA admitted that this season would be difficult to predict because of changing conditions, but both organizations cited a dissipating El Niño and the formation of a La Niña event, which resulted in the prediction of a near-normal season in both basins. In the Central Pacific, about four to seven cyclones would form or enter within the basin, citing an equal 40% chance of an above-normal or near-normal season.

== Seasonal summary ==
Four simultaneous tropical cyclones active on July 22. From left to right: Darby, Estelle, Eight-E (which would soon become Georgette), and Frank

The accumulated cyclone energy (ACE) index for the 2016 Pacific hurricane season as calculated by Colorado State University using data from the National Hurricane Center was 184.9 units. (Note: The total represents the sum of the squares of the maximum sustained wind speed (knots) for every (sub)tropical storm's intensity of over 33 knots (38 mph; 61 km/h), divided by 10,000 while they are above that threshold; therefore, tropical depressions are not included.)

As the new year began, Pali formed on January 7, in the central Pacific, two days before the date Tropical Storm Winona formed in 1989. Pali subsequently surpassed Hurricane Ekeka's record as the earliest hurricane on January 11. When Pali reached a peak intensity of 100 mph, it surpassed Winona to become the strongest January tropical cyclone east of the International Date Line.

In the eastern Pacific, no tropical depressions or storms formed during the month of May for the first time since 2011, and then, no named storms formed during June for the first time since 2007. When Agatha formed on July 2, it became the latest first named storm on record in the eastern Pacific proper since 1969. Despite this, the season set a record for the most number of storms during the first half of July. When Georgette formed on July 21, it became the seventh named storm to form in the month of July; equaling the previous record set in 1985 and 2015 for the most active July since reliable records began. And when Frank became a hurricane (after Georgette did so), it marked a record-high 5 hurricanes in July. Finally, Howard formed on July 31, however, was not named until August 1, one named storm shy of the record. Despite that, the season tied the record set in 1985 with the most named storms in July. Activity in August was slightly less active than July. Lester and Madeline threatened the Big Island at hurricane strength. Lester passed north of the islands, Madeline brought some rain as the storm dissipated south of Hawaii. Javier and Newton followed similar paths close to the Mexican coast, with both making landfall in the Baja California Peninsula in August and early September respectively. After Newton led off September; Hurricanes Orlene, Paine and Tropical Storm Roslyn followed forming far from land. Hurricane Ulika became the first tropical cyclone on record to cross 140°W three times. It formed and was designated a tropical depression in the eastern Pacific, but did not develop into a tropical storm until after entering the central Pacific, where, like Pali, it was named from the basin's Hawaiian language lists of names. After an unusually quiet October, Hurricane Seymour became the sixth major hurricane of the season, as well as the strongest. Tropical Storm Tina formed close to the coast of Mexico in mid-November. In late November, Tropical Storm Otto entered the basin from the Atlantic, becoming only the eighteenth cyclone to do so; however, it dissipated quickly due to unfavorable conditions.

== Systems ==
=== Hurricane Pali ===
- Category 2 hurricane (SSHWS)
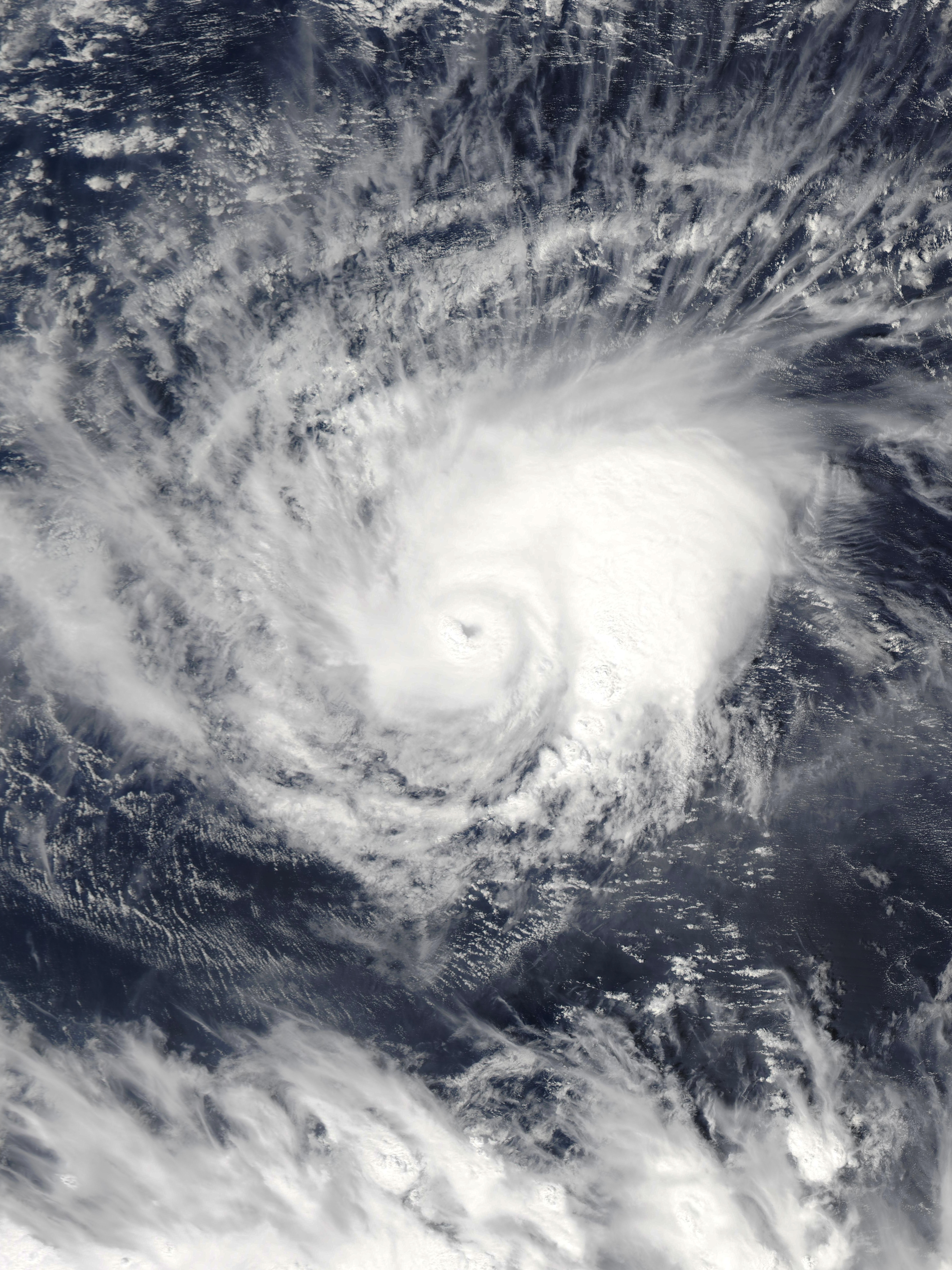
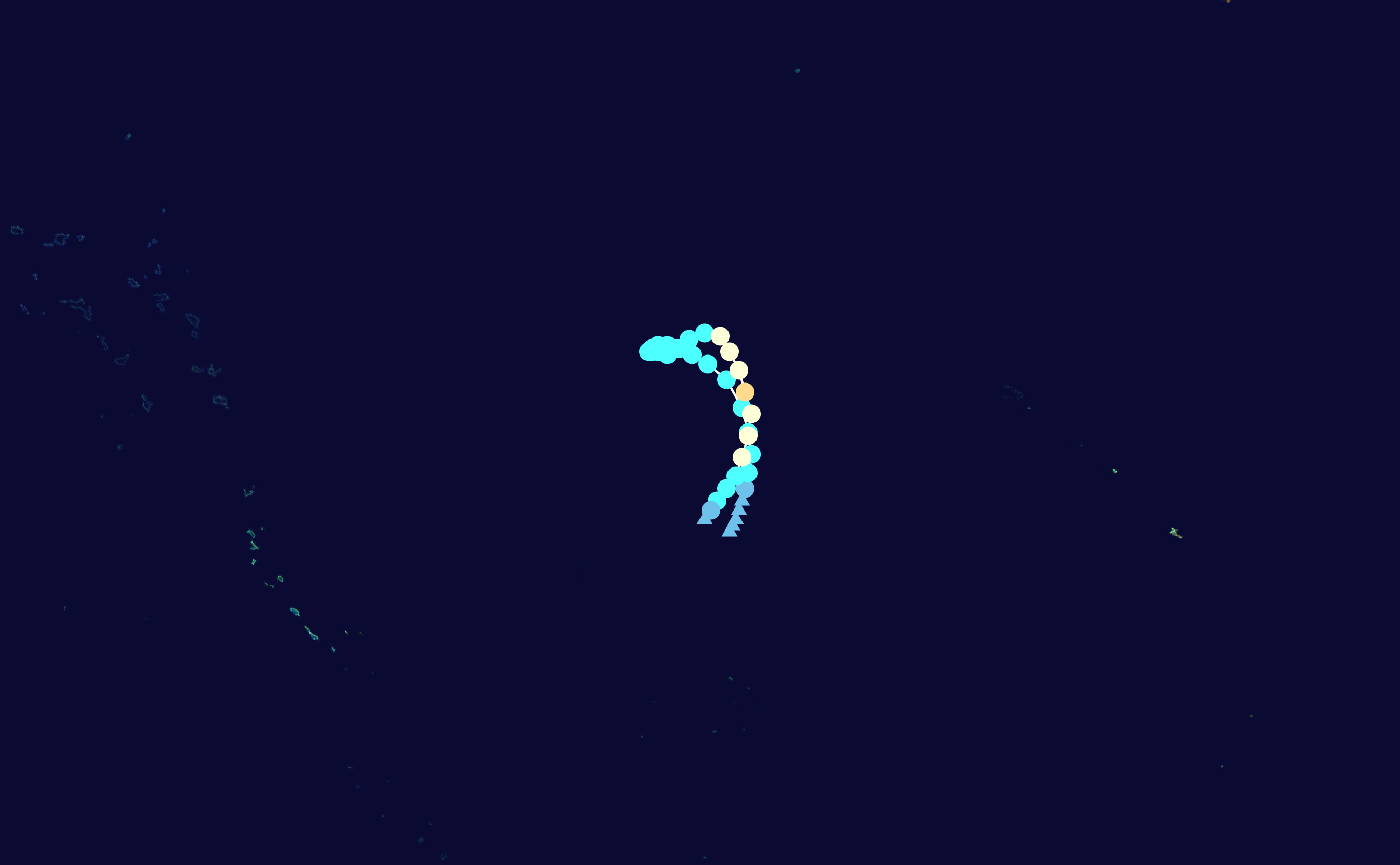
- Duration: January 7 – January 14
- Peak intensity: 100 mph (155 km/h) (1-min); 978 mbar (hPa)

A powerful and long-lived westerly wind burst—a feature commonly associated with strong El Niño events—spurred cyclogenesis within a persistent low-latitude, west-to-east oriented surface trough, resulting in the formation of an area of low pressure on January 6. Fueled by unusually high sea surface temperatures, estimated at 29.5 °C (85.1 °F), the system gradually coalesced into a tropical depression on January 7. A ridge aloft centered directly overhead the system enhanced its poleward outflow, enabling the development of deep convection around its center, which soon strengthened into a tropical storm receiving the name Pali, becoming the earliest such system in the northeastern Pacific on record. Pali continued intensifying through the first half of January 8 and nearly reached hurricane strength, but easterly vertical wind shear caused by the ridge disrupted its center, causing it to start weakening and move northwestward. Steady weakening continued through January 9 as Pali's deep convection was displaced to the west of its low-level center and intermittently pulsed, later leading to a dramatic decrease in intensity. By the end of that day, Pali barely maintained tropical storm strength, and the lack of persistent deep convection permitted it to be less affected by the easterly wind shear, causing its forward motion to decrease significantly. As the ridge weakened and retreated southward on January 10, causing vertical wind shear to gradually diminish, Pali started re-intensifying, with persistent deep convection redeveloping near its center and within its western quadrant. On January 11, the ridge passed directly over Pali, leading to the reestablishment of poleward outflow and eventual development of southwesterly flow, enabling its convection to slowly increase in coverage and organization within all quadrants and establishing a northeastward movement.

On January 12, light vertical wind shear and high sea surface temperatures enabled Pali to strengthen into a Category 1 hurricane. Later that day, Pali strengthened further into a Category 2 hurricane while travelling southwards, reaching its peak intensity. During the next few days, Pali rapidly weakened while turning back towards the south-southeast, due to steady increases in southerly vertical wind shear and loss of Coriolis force. Further decay in the organization of deep convection made Pali being downgraded into a remnant low late on January 14. While weakening, Pali reached a minimum latitude of 2.6°N, making it the second-lowest latitude tropical cyclone on record in the Western Hemisphere, behind Tropical Depression Nine-C which attained a minimum latitude of 2.2°N just two weeks prior. Pali completed a broad and looping track, by dissipating approximately 50 nmi (58 mi; 93 km) from where it initially developed. Unrelated to Pali, Hurricane Alex developed over the Atlantic during the last few days of Pali's existence. This marked the first known occurrence of simultaneous January tropical cyclones between the two basins.

Hurricane Pali had severe impacts in Kiribati. Pali's storm surge caused major coastal flooding, with the island nation reporting significant property damage. Pali also caused a cargo ship to run aground on the coast of Kiribati, killing four people.

=== Tropical Depression One-E ===
- Tropical depression (SSHWS)
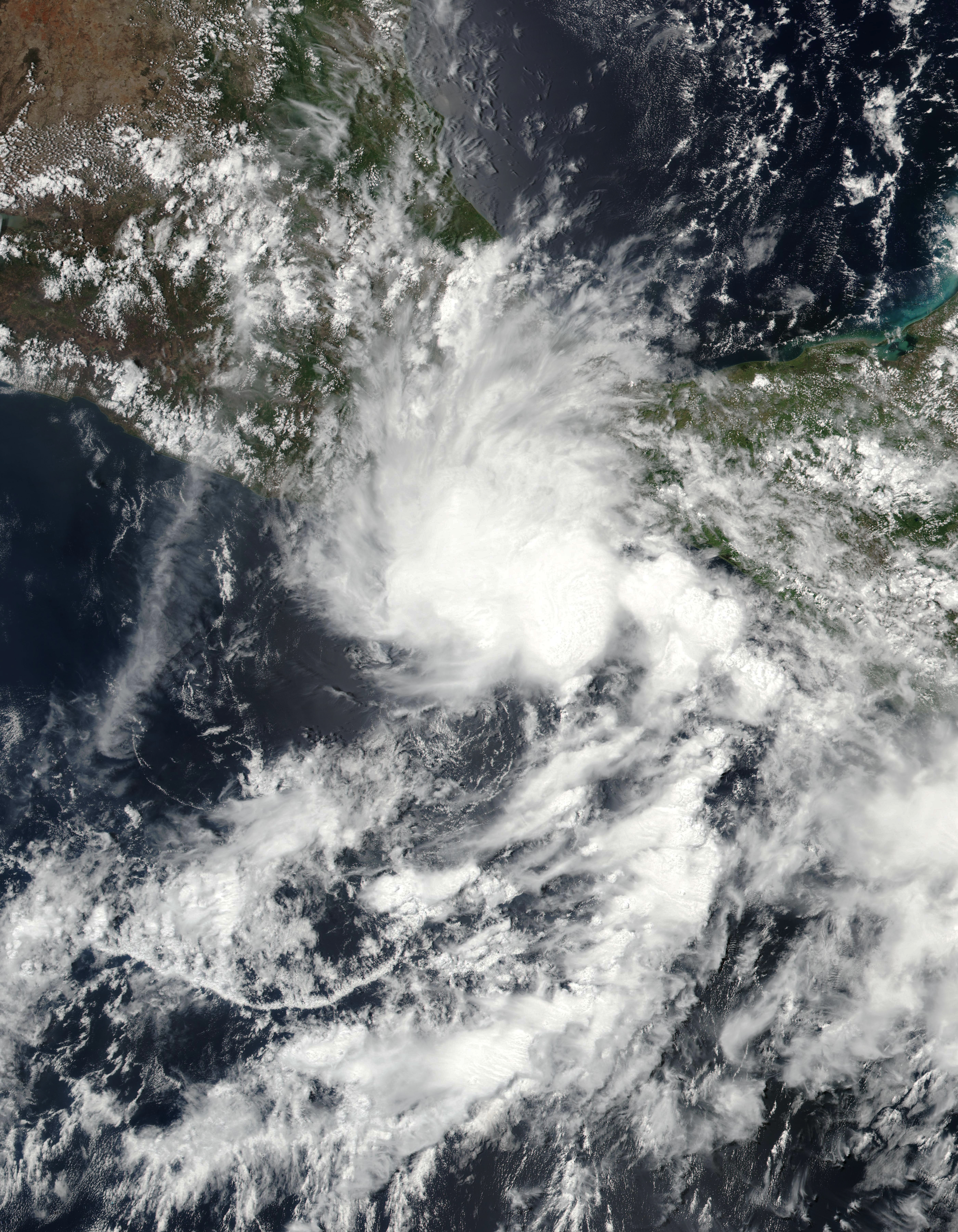
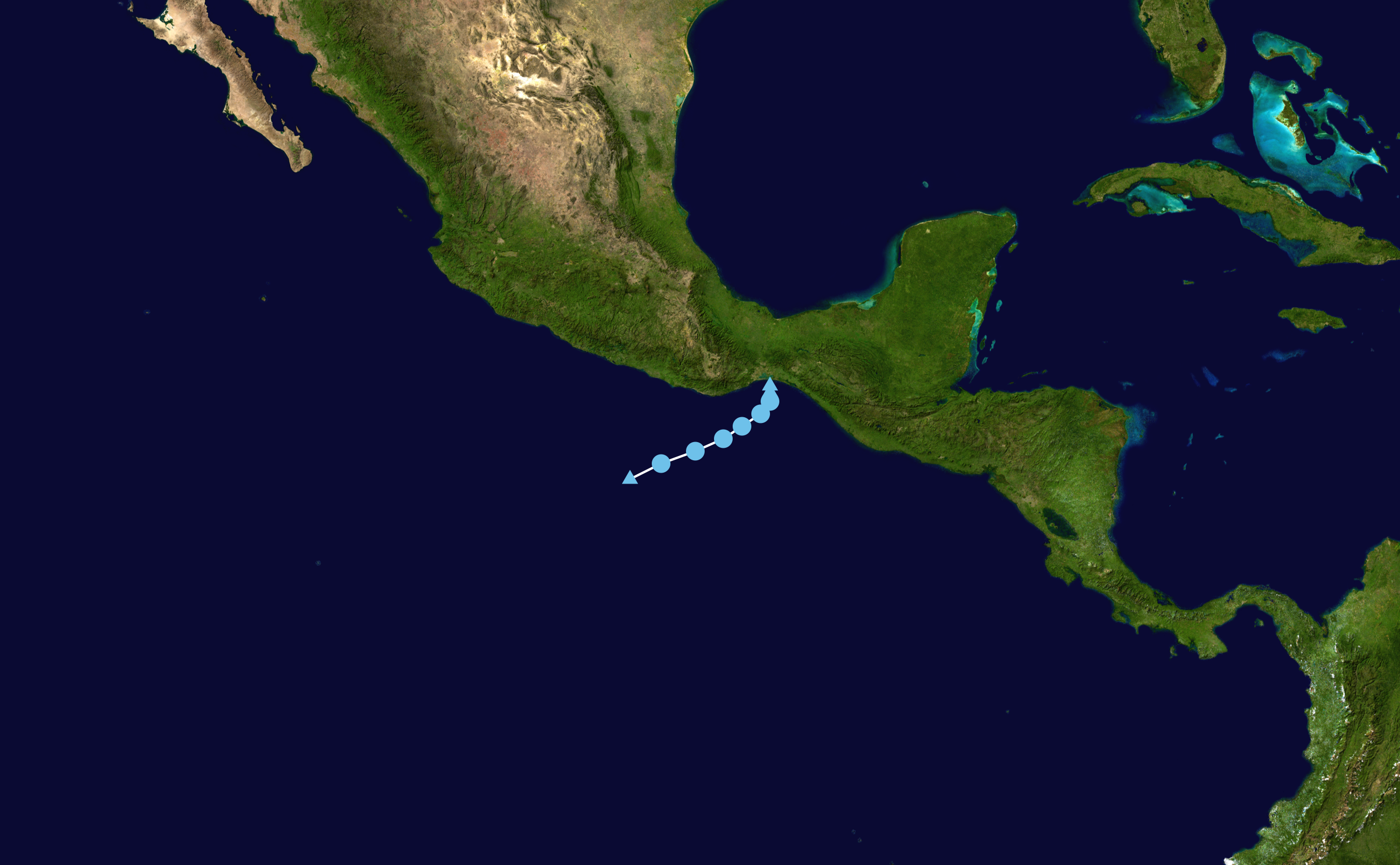
- Duration: June 6 – June 8
- Peak intensity: 35 mph (55 km/h) (1-min); 1006 mbar (hPa)

On June 4, the National Hurricane Center began monitoring an area for possible development. Over the next few days, the chances of the storm forming were low. Unexpectedly, however, on June 6, advisories began to be issued on Tropical Depression One-E. This led the Government of Mexico to issue a Tropical Storm Watch for its coast. On June 7, the watch was removed as the storm weakened slightly. Early on June 8, the storm made landfall in Mexico near the Gulf of Tehuantepec and dissipated.

As a precautionary measure, temporary shelters were opened across Chiapas. The depression caused minor damage across Oaxaca, primarily within the Salina Cruz municipality. Heavy rains led to some street flooding and a sinkhole that damaged one home.

=== Tropical Storm Agatha ===
- Tropical storm (SSHWS)
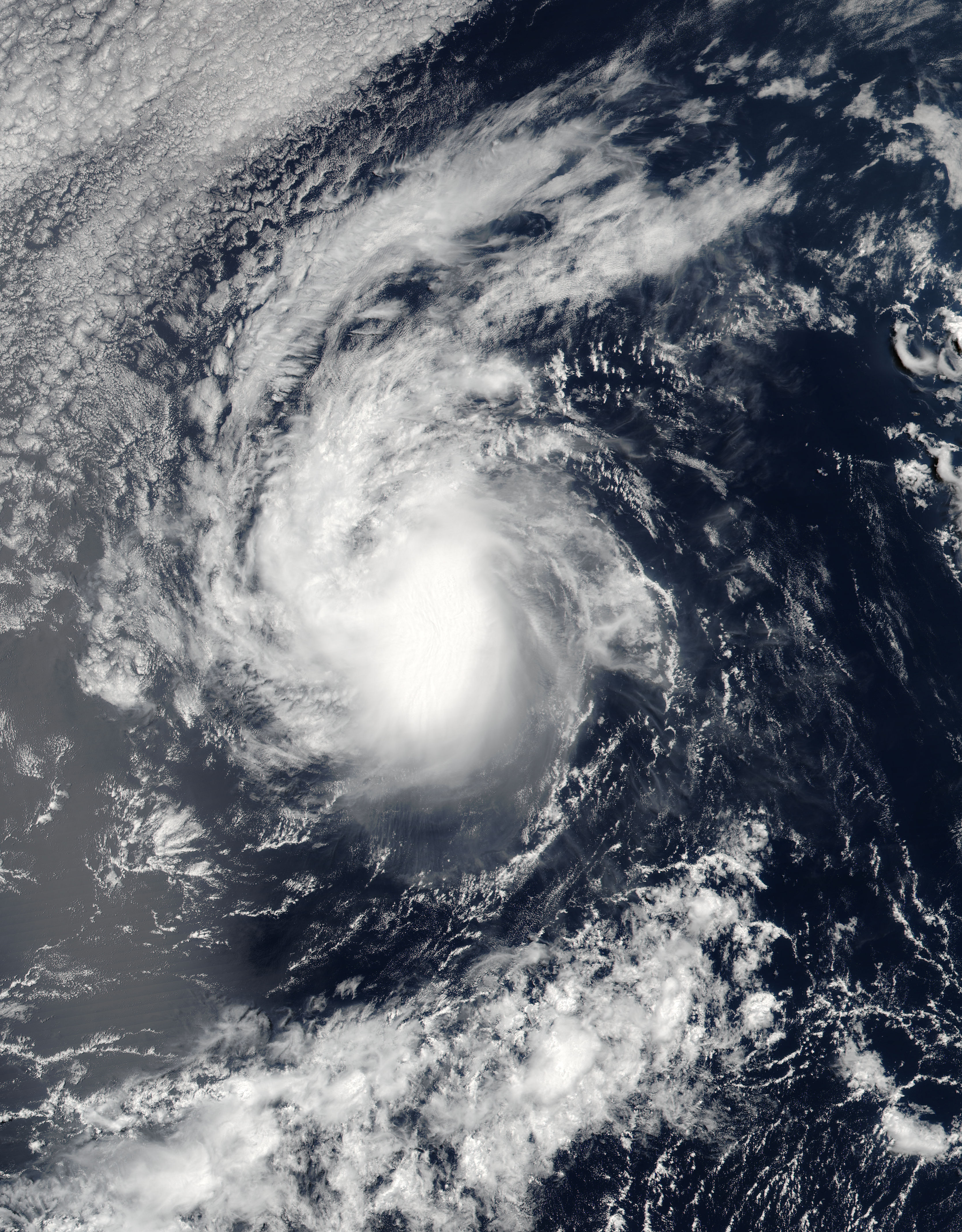
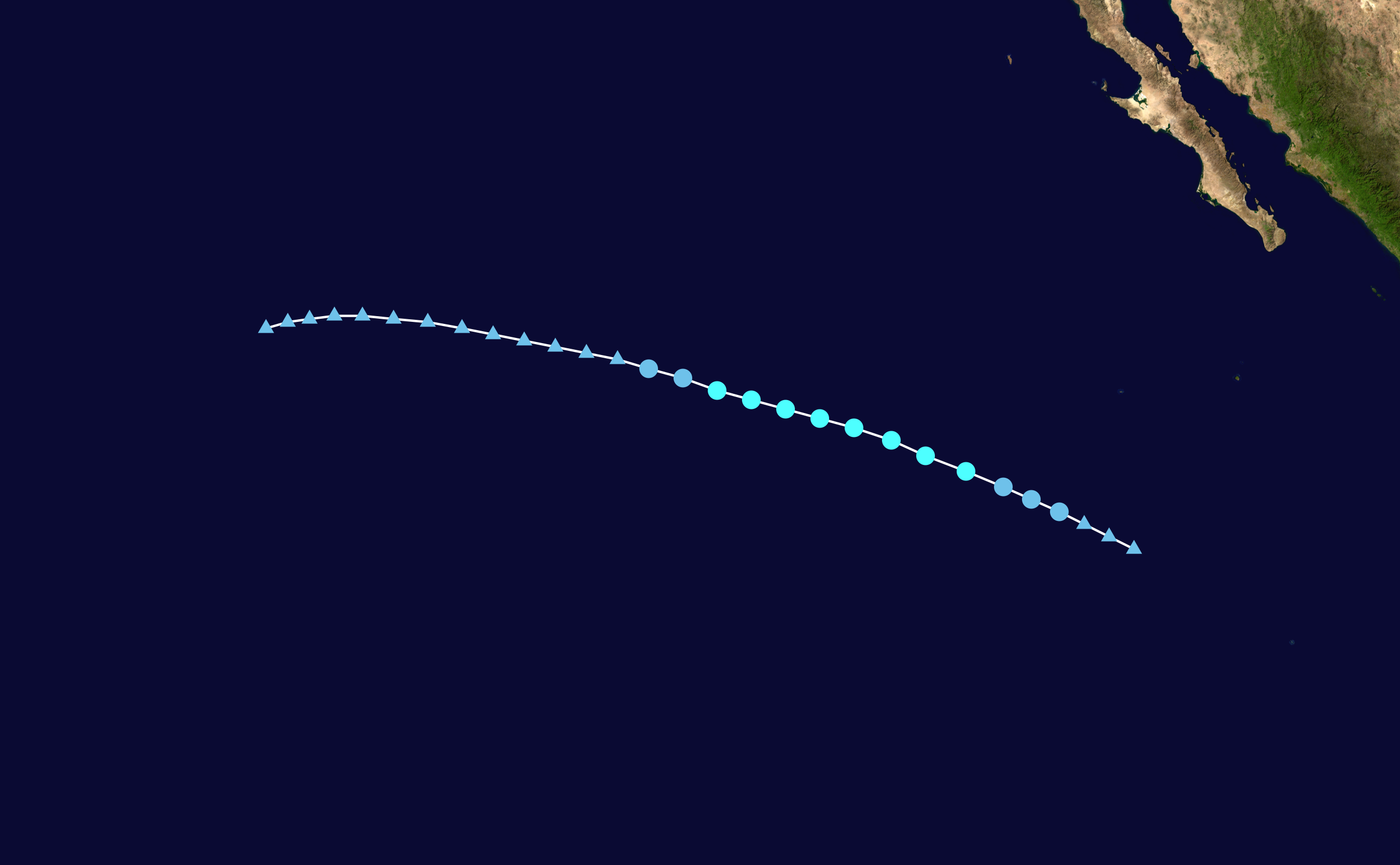
- Duration: July 2 – July 5
- Peak intensity: 50 mph (85 km/h) (1-min); 1002 mbar (hPa)

On June 30, the National Hurricane Center began to monitor an area for possible formation. On July 1, organization unexpectedly increased. Seven hours later, early on July 2, the tropical disturbance strengthened into Tropical Depression Two-E. The system quickly organized, and later that day, the NHC upgraded Two-E into Tropical Storm Agatha. Agatha slightly strengthened to peak intensity on July 3. Winds topped off at 50 mph. Soon after, Agatha weakened slightly, with winds lowering to 40 mph later that day. The storm continued westwards over the next two days. Early on July 5, Agatha became post-tropical.

=== Hurricane Blas ===
- Category 4 hurricane (SSHWS)
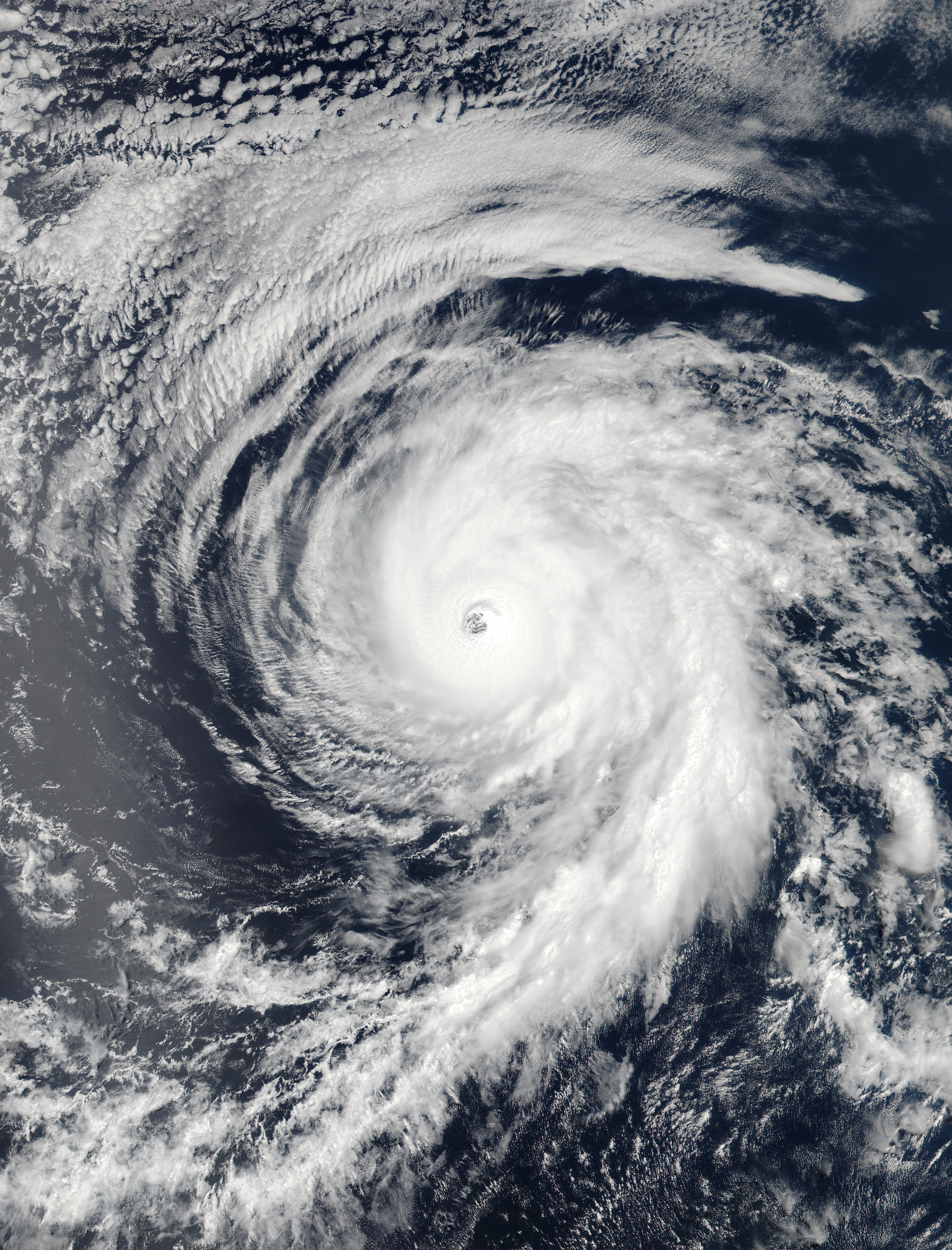
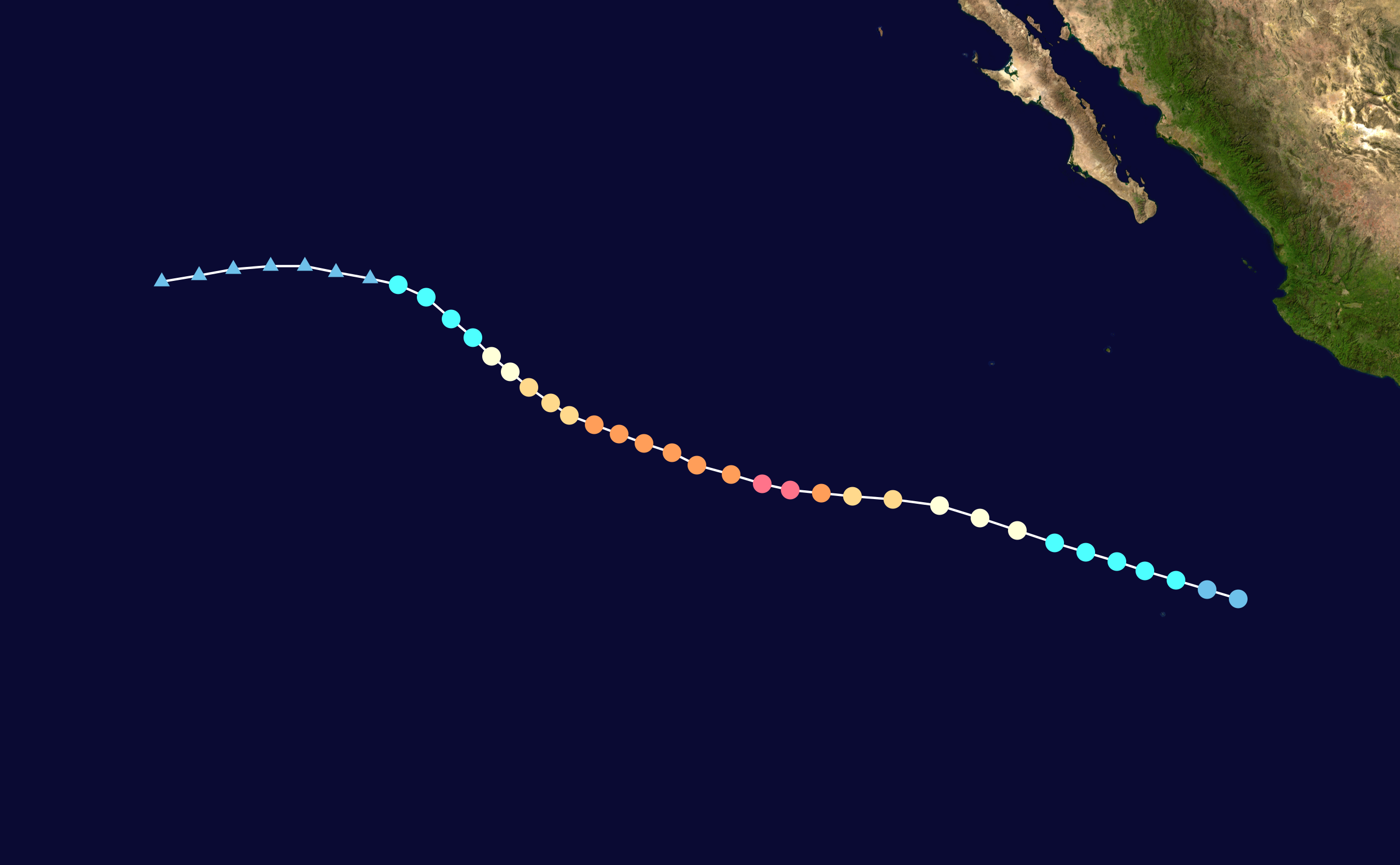
- Duration: July 2 – July 10
- Peak intensity: 140 mph (220 km/h) (1-min); 947 mbar (hPa)

On June 27, the NHC began to monitor a tropical wave moving over Central America for possible development. A low-pressure area formed south of Mexico on June 30, and early on July 3, the storm gained enough organization to be designated Tropical Depression Three-E. Six hours later, amid a favorable environment with warm sea surface temperatures and decreasing vertical wind shear, it intensified into Tropical Storm Blas. Steady strengthening ensued, and Blas intensified into a hurricane on July 4. Intensification stalled for the remainder of that day as dry air wrapped into the circulation; however, Blas began to rapidly deepen on July 5, and it became the first major hurricane of the season that evening. Blas quickly reached peak intensity at Category 4 strength on July 6. Blas weakened to a Category 3 hurricane soon after, before transitioning into an annular tropical cyclone and maintaining intensity. However, Blas soon passed over decreasing sea surface temperatures, resulting in a slow weakening trend; Blas weakened below major hurricane status late on July 7, and down to a Category 1 hurricane by the next day. Blas further degraded to a tropical storm on July 9, as weakening accelerated amid a stable air mass and increasing southwesterly shear. Over sea surface temperatures of 24 °C (75 °F), Blas weakened to a tropical depression on July 10, and degenerated into a post-tropical cyclone soon after.

Moisture associated with the remnants of Blas brought showers to Hawaii. Peak daily rainfall totals primarily ranged between 1 and 2 in (25 and 50 mm) and did not cause any serious flooding.

=== Hurricane Celia ===
- Category 2 hurricane (SSHWS)
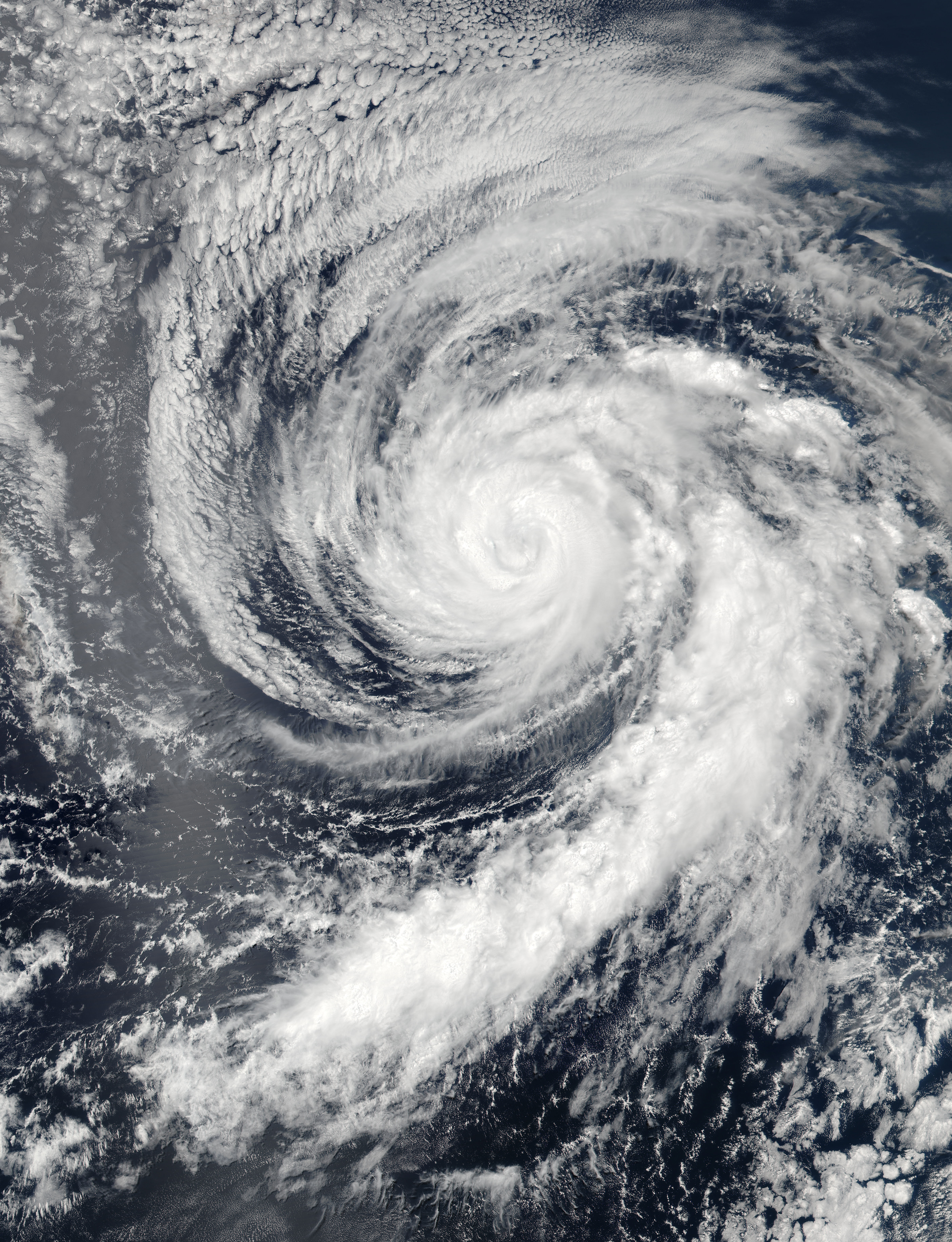
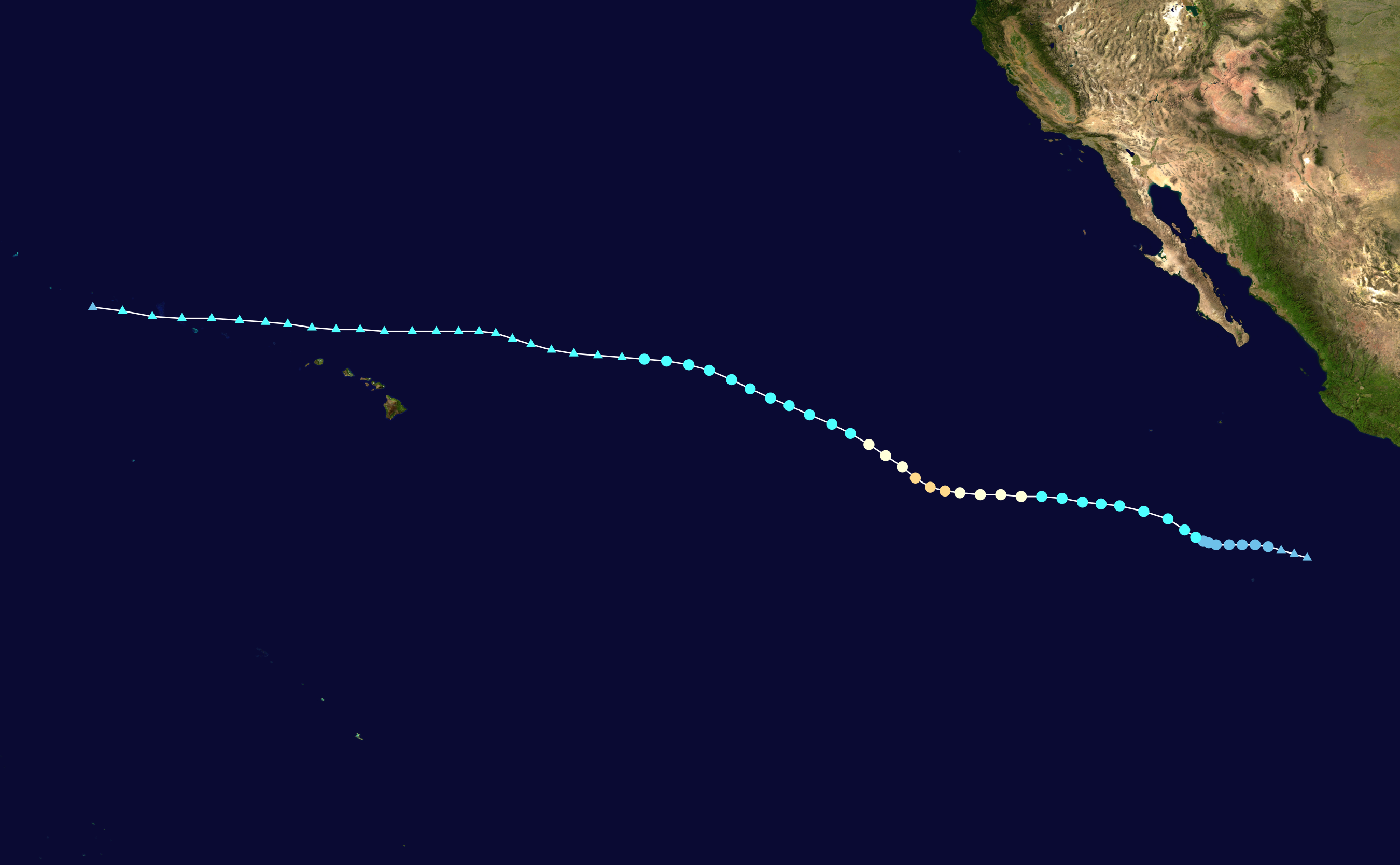
- Duration: July 6 – July 16
- Peak intensity: 100 mph (155 km/h) (1-min); 972 mbar (hPa)

On June 27, the NHC began monitoring a tropical wave over Central America. The wave entered the East Pacific the following day, eventually gaining sufficient organization to be declared a tropical depression by 21:00 UTC on July 6. The newly formed cyclone initially struggled to intensify with upwelling resultant from Hurricane Blas, but a formative central dense overcast and several spiral bands prompted an upgrade to Tropical Storm Celia by 15:00 UTC on July 8. Celia began to intensify after moving into warmer waters, obtaining Category 1 hurricane intensity by 21:00 UTC on July 10 and peaking as a Category 2 hurricane with winds of 100 mph (160 km/h) the next afternoon. Thereafter, progressively cooler waters caused the system to weaken: it fell below hurricane intensity by 09:00 UTC on July 13, weakened to a tropical depression by 21:00 UTC on July 15 after entering the Central Pacific, and degenerated into a remnant low well east-northeast of Hawaii six hours later.

Although the remnants of Celia passed north of Hawaii, it disrupted the typical trade winds, resulting in higher humidity across the island group and brief but heavy showers over central Oahu and the windward slopes of Maui and the Big Island on July 18. Precipitation totals ranged form 1 to 2.5 in (25 to 65 mm), prompting flash flood advisories. In addition to the rain, large swells as high as 15 ft (4.6 m) generated by Celia and its remnants affected the east-facing shores of the Hawaiian Islands. resulting in high surf advisories. These swells produced rough surf that caused two drowning deaths on the southeastern shore of the island of Oahu on July 16.

=== Hurricane Darby ===
- Category 3 hurricane (SSHWS)
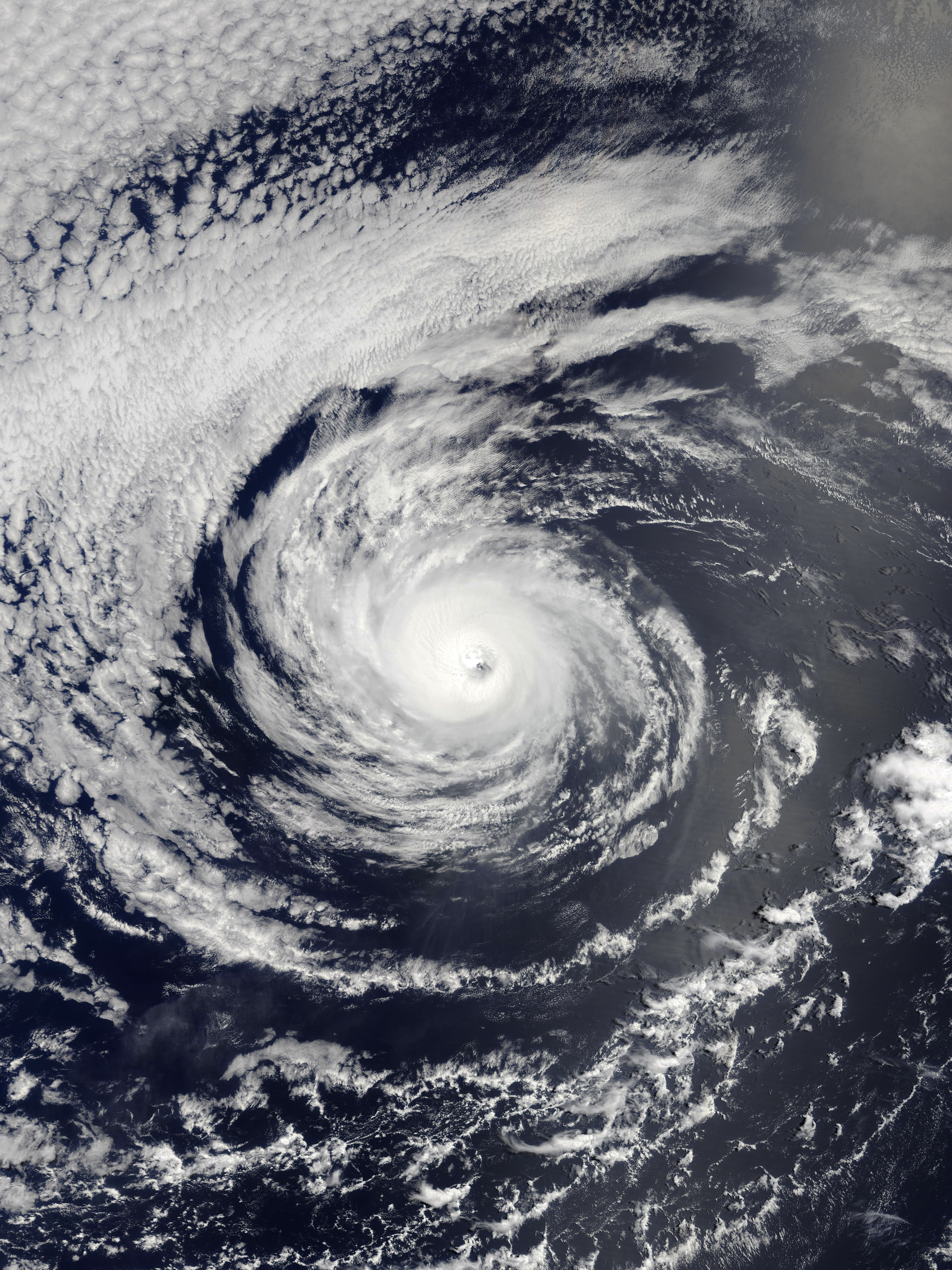
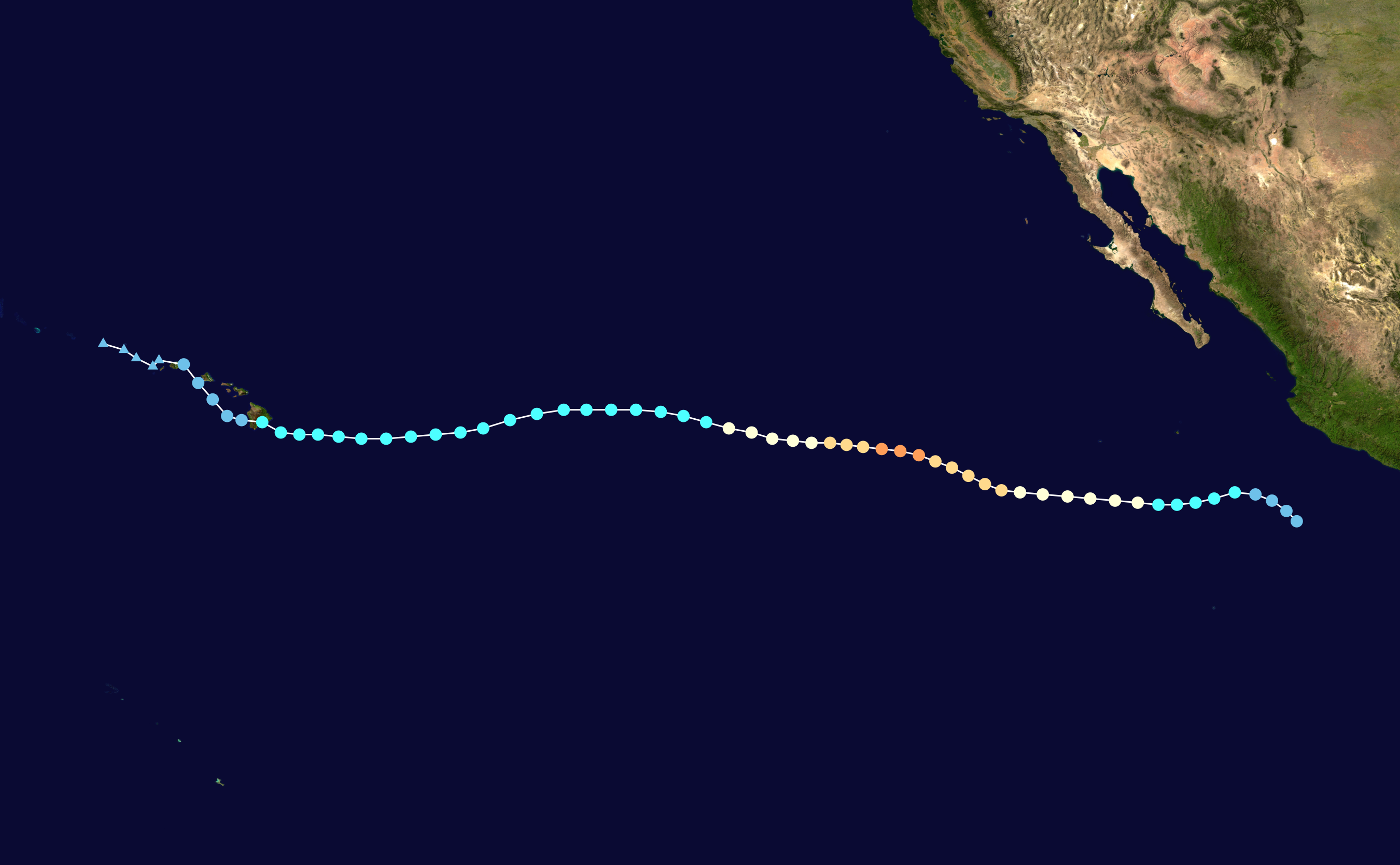
- Duration: July 11 – July 26
- Peak intensity: 120 mph (195 km/h) (1-min); 958 mbar (hPa)

In the first two weeks of July, five low-pressure systems formed in the Eastern Pacific. The fourth of these was first noted by the National Hurricane Center on July 9; it was located in a favorable environment, and was expected to develop into a tropical storm. On July 11, the low was upgraded into Tropical Depression Five-E. On July 12, Five-E intensified into a tropical storm, and was assigned the name Darby; the next day it attained hurricane status. It later strengthened into a Category 2 hurricane on July 15. On July 16, despite traveling over cooler waters, Darby unexpectedly became a Category 3 hurricane. However, 6 hours later, Darby weakened back to a Category 2. Over the next four days, Darby gradually degraded over cooler waters as the storm moved westwards, towards Hawaii. But, as it moved closer towards the area, it strengthened again, prompting several Tropical Storm warnings and watches to be issued for the Hawaiian Islands. At 00:00 UTC July 24, it made landfall near Pahala of the Big Island. Crossing the island as a minimal tropical storm, it was the first to do so since Hurricane Iselle in 2014. Slight weakening occurred as Darby traversed the island, however the storm retained minimal tropical storm strength as the storm began to move northwestwards. On July 25, Darby was downgraded into a depression near Oahu and degraded into a remnant low 18 hours later.

=== Tropical Storm Estelle ===
- Tropical storm (SSHWS)
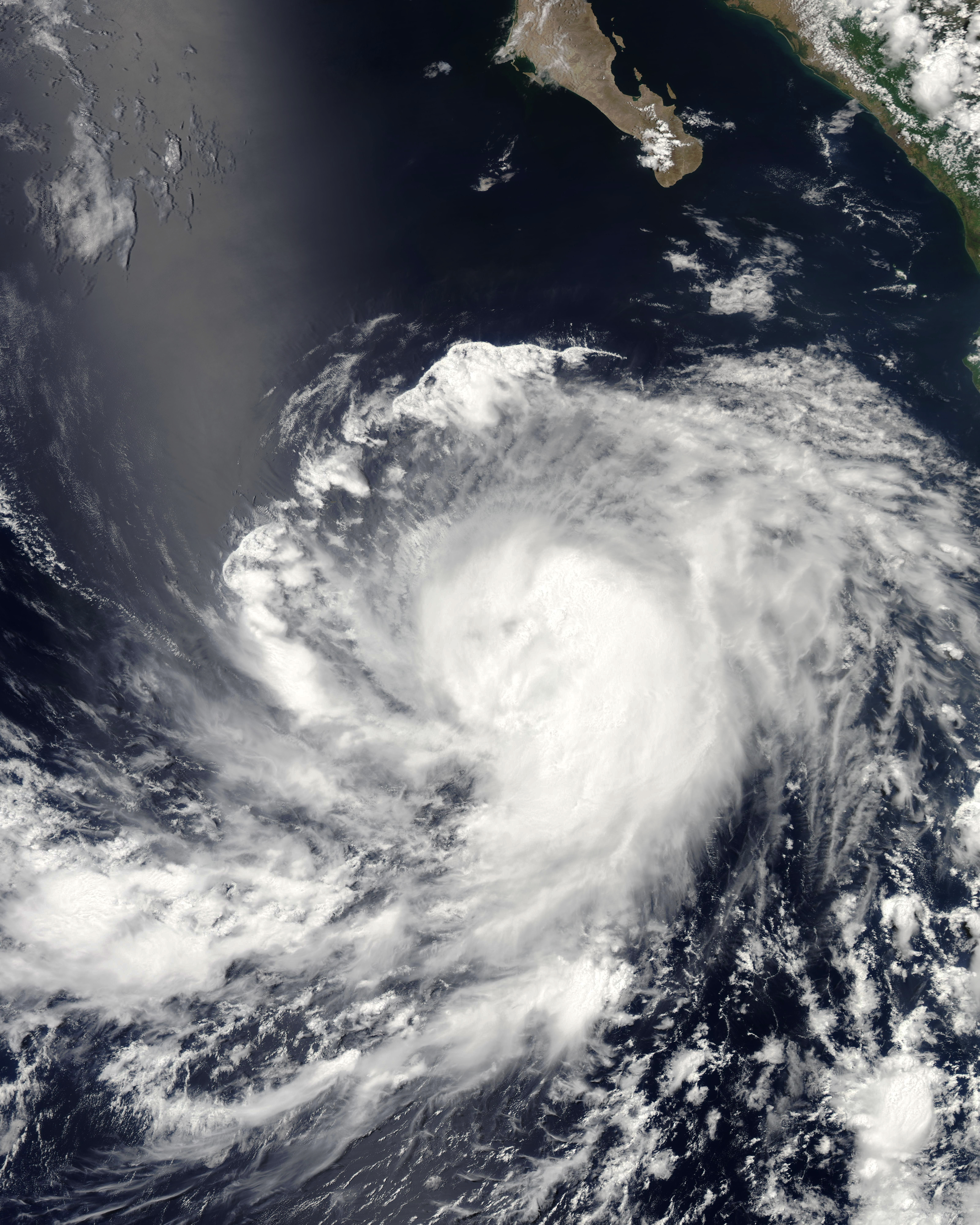
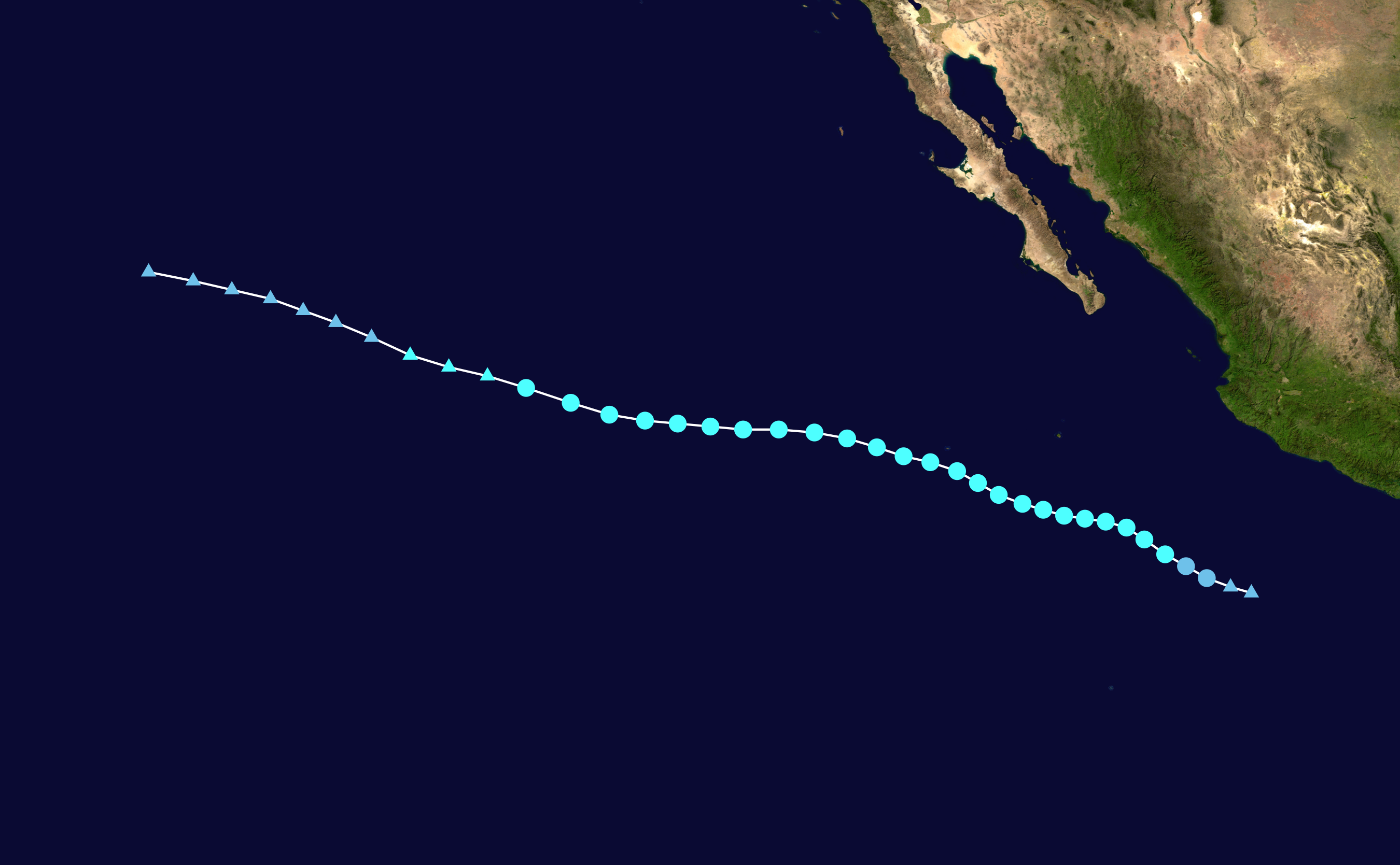
- Duration: July 15 – July 22
- Peak intensity: 70 mph (110 km/h) (1-min); 990 mbar (hPa)

In the line of continuous tropical cyclones with the same path, the low that would become Estelle began to be monitored on July 14. Less than a day after being designated as a low-pressure system on July 15, it was upgraded to Tropical Depression Six-E. Early on July 16, the fifth tropical storm of the Eastern Pacific season formed, being assigned the name Estelle. By July 18, Estelle had strengthened into a 70 mph (110 km/h) storm, just below hurricane status, however, it slightly weakened afterwards. Estelle continued to maintain its strength, however, by July 20, the storm was not forecast to strengthen into a hurricane and began degrading over cooler water northeast of Hawaii. On July 22, Estelle weakened into a 40 mph (65 km/h) storm and degraded into a remnant low later that day.

=== Hurricane Frank ===
- Category 1 hurricane (SSHWS)
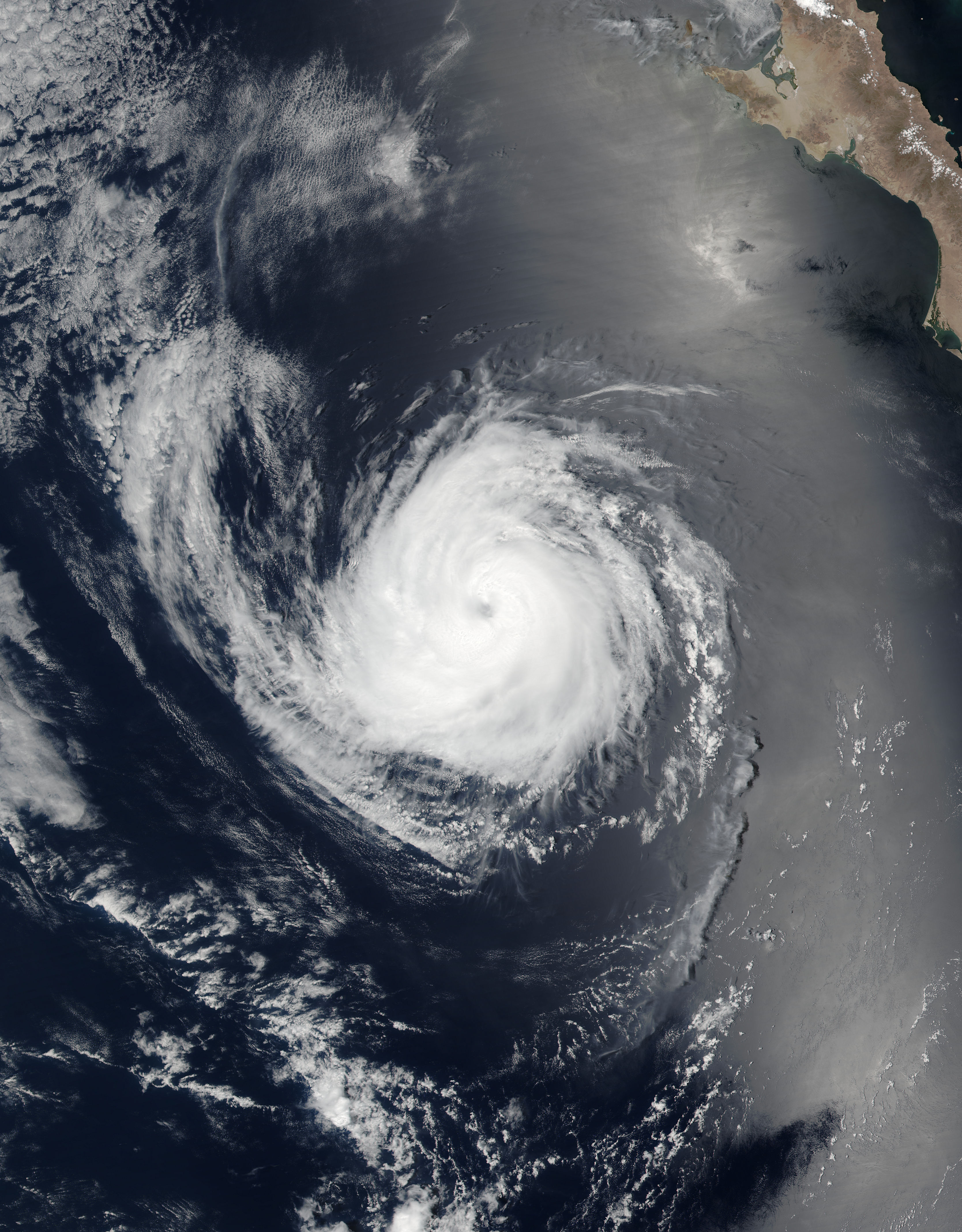
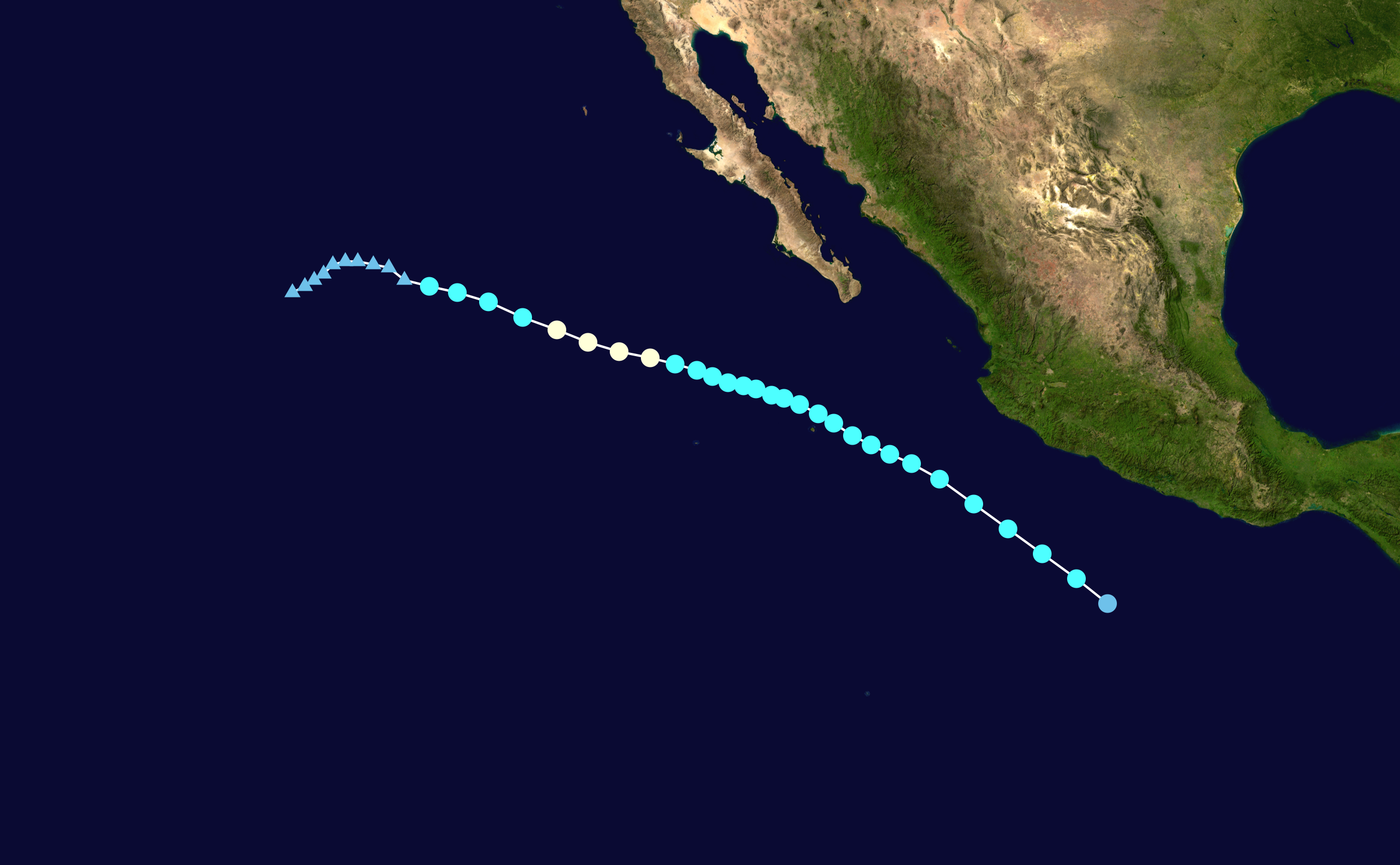
- Duration: July 21 – July 28
- Peak intensity: 85 mph (140 km/h) (1-min); 979 mbar (hPa)

On July 16, the NHC noted that an area of low pressure was forecast to form south of Mexico in a few days. A broad area of low pressure formed well south-southeast of Acapulco, Mexico three days later, eventually organizing into Tropical Storm Frank by 21:00 UTC on July 21. Steered northwest and then west-northwest, the cyclone steadily intensified within a favorable environment; by July 25, however, Frank passed over cooler waters resultant from upwelling by previous cyclones, which caused weakening. The system re-intensified after entering warm waters, becoming the record-setting fifth hurricane during the month by 15:00 UTC on July 26 and peaking with winds of 85 mph (135 km/h) twelve hours later. The negative effects of cooler waters began to impede on the system shortly thereafter, causing Frank to weaken to a tropical storm by 15:00 UTC on July 27, fall to a tropical depression by 15:00 UTC on July 28, and degenerate into a remnant low six hours later.

The outer rainbands of Frank brought heavy rains to Nayarit. In Tepic, several neighborhoods were flooded and 135 homes were damaged. A total of 200 families were rendered homeless, and forced to seek shelter. The remnants of Frank passed near the Hawaiian Islands on August 3 and 4. Showers over the windward slopes resulted in daily rainfall totals over 1 in (25 mm) in isolated locations but no flooding was reported.

=== Hurricane Georgette ===
- Category 4 hurricane (SSHWS)
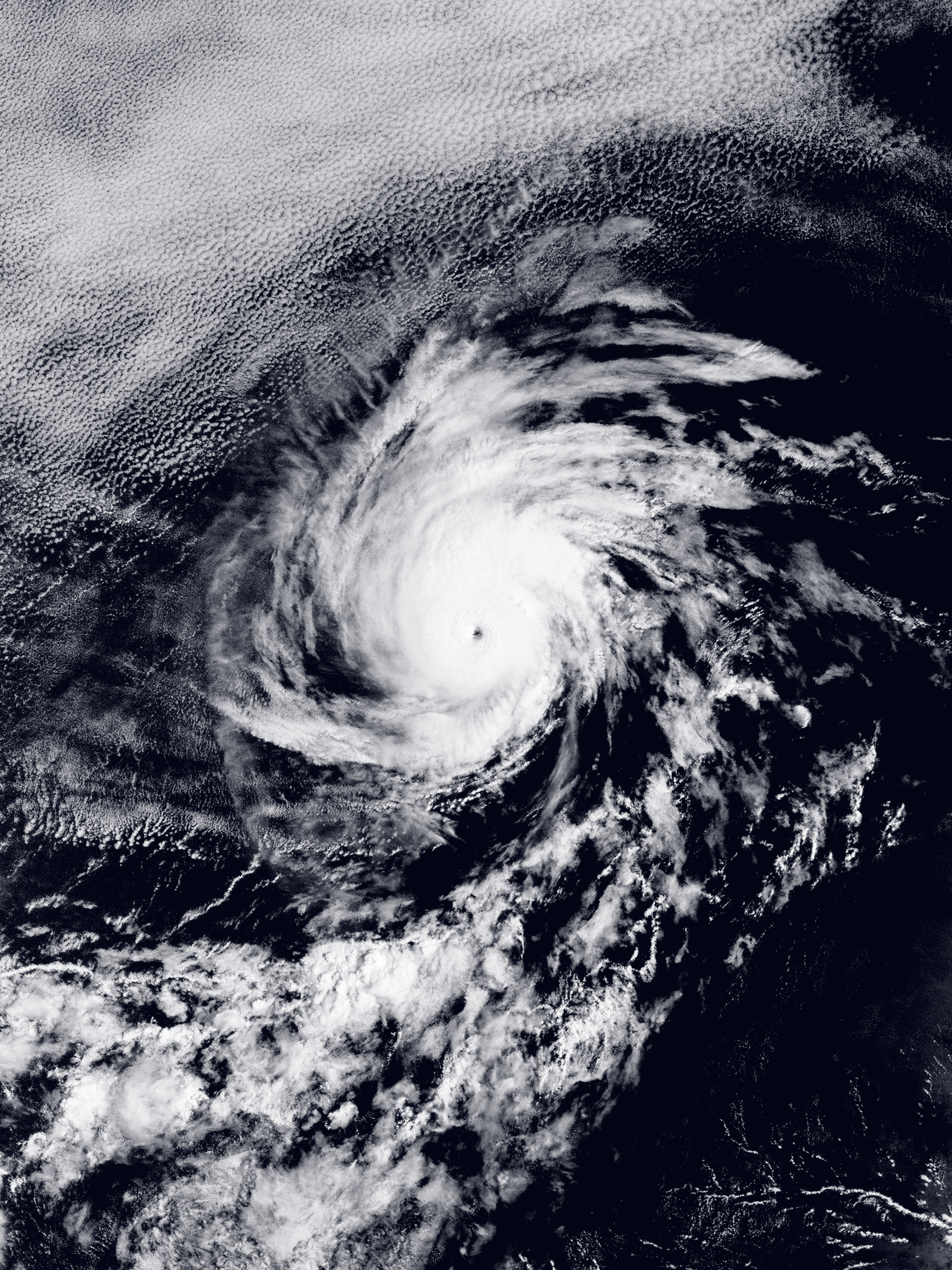
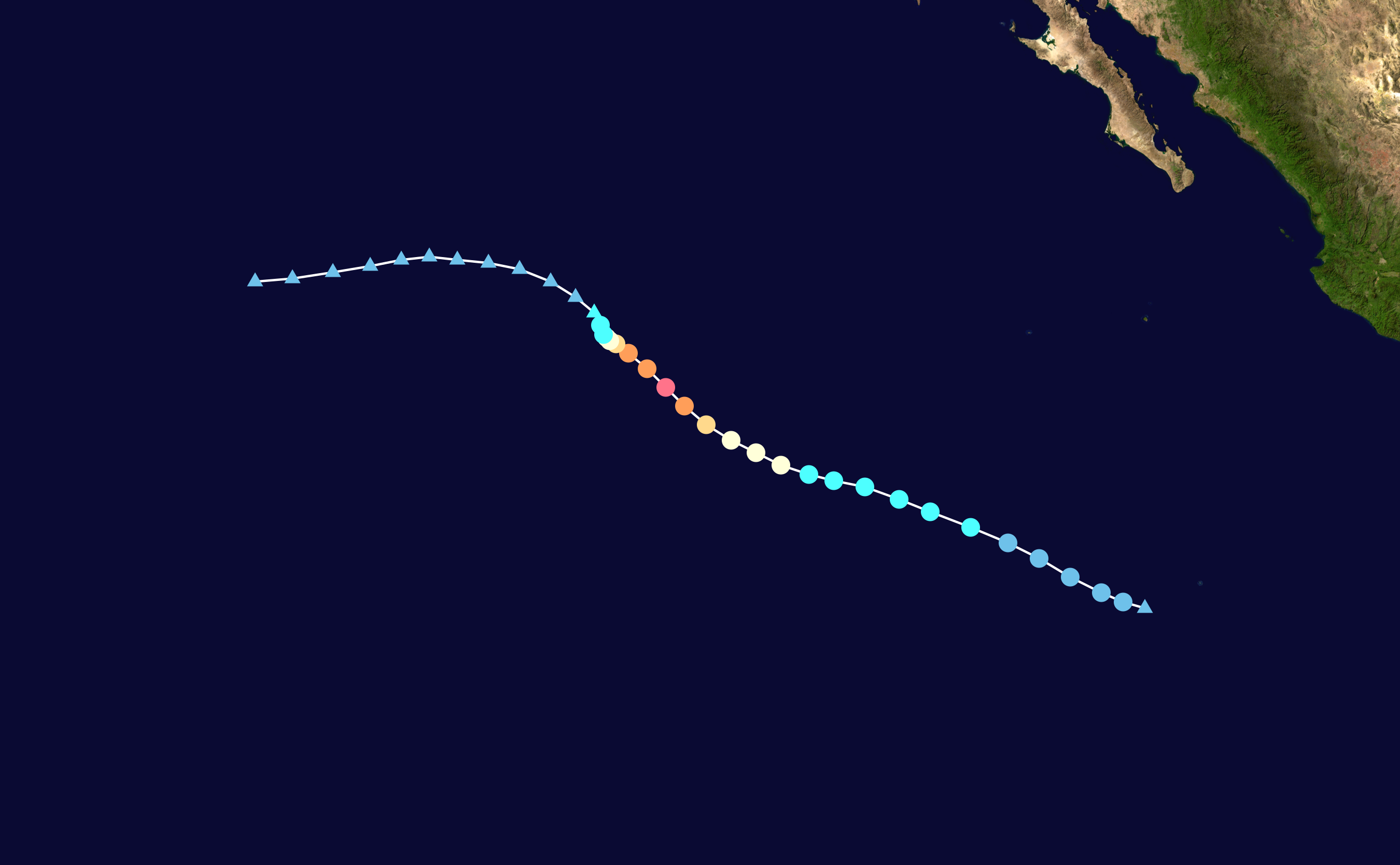
- Duration: July 21 – July 27
- Peak intensity: 130 mph (215 km/h) (1-min); 952 mbar (hPa)

On July 15, the NHC noted that an area of low pressure was forecast to form well south of Mexico early the subsequent week. An area of disturbed weather became established south of the Gulf of Tehuantepec the following day, organizing sufficiently to be deemed a tropical depression by 21:00 UTC on July 21. Despite moderate northeasterly wind shear, the depression intensified into Tropical Storm Georgette by 15:00 UTC on July 22 and was further upgraded to a Category 1 hurricane by 03:00 UTC on July 24. Over a 24-hour period ending at 03:00 UTC July 25, the cyclone's maximum winds increased from 75 mph (120 km/h) to a peak of 130 mph (210 km/h) as convection became more symmetric and an eye cleared. Progressively cooler waters and a more stable environment, however, caused Georgette to begin weakening soon thereafter: it fell below hurricane intensity by 15:00 UTC on July 26 and further degenerated into a remnant low well west-southwest of Baja California a day later.

Remnant moisture from Georgette brought heavy rain to Oahu on July 31 but caused only minor flooding.

=== Tropical Storm Howard ===
- Tropical storm (SSHWS)
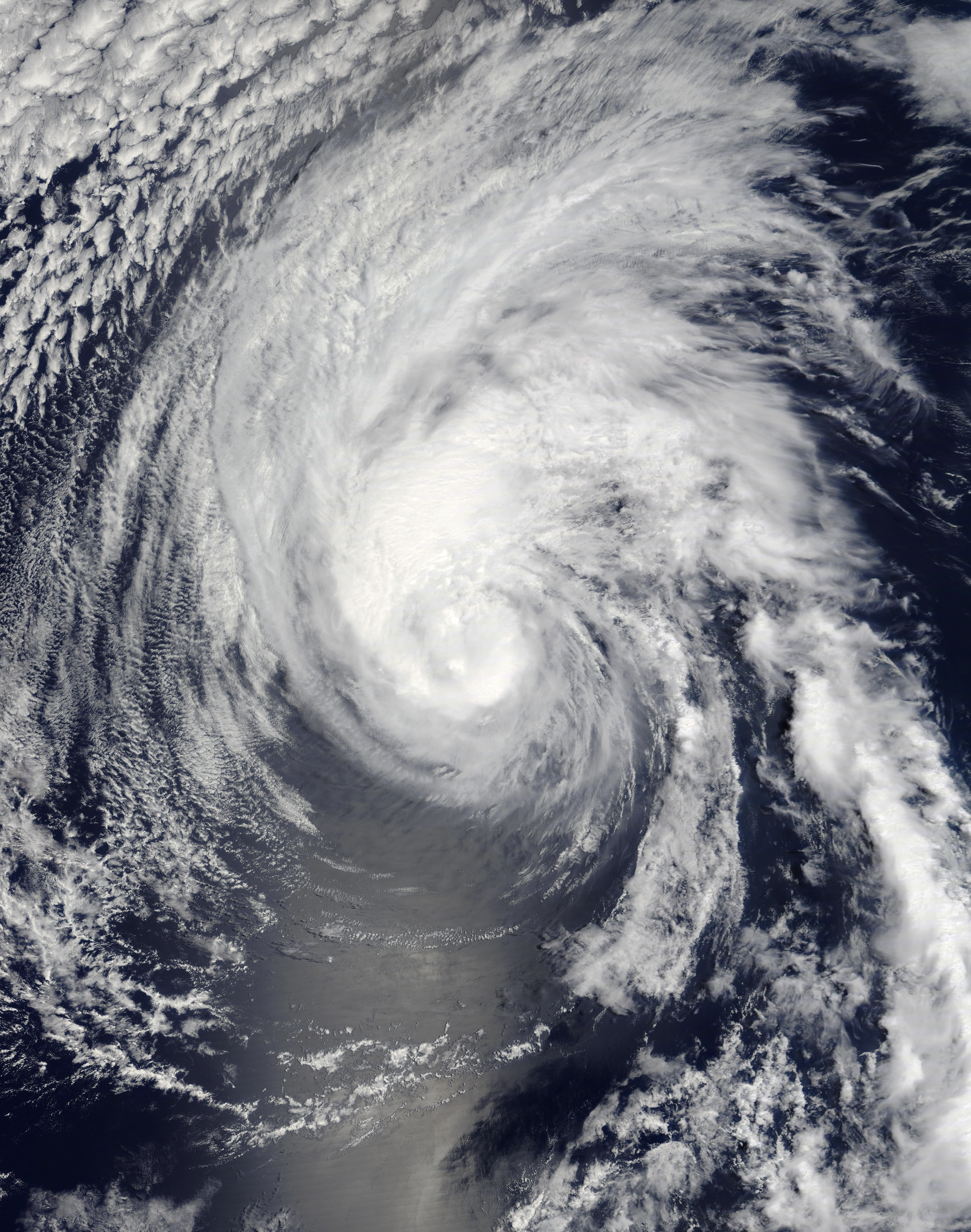
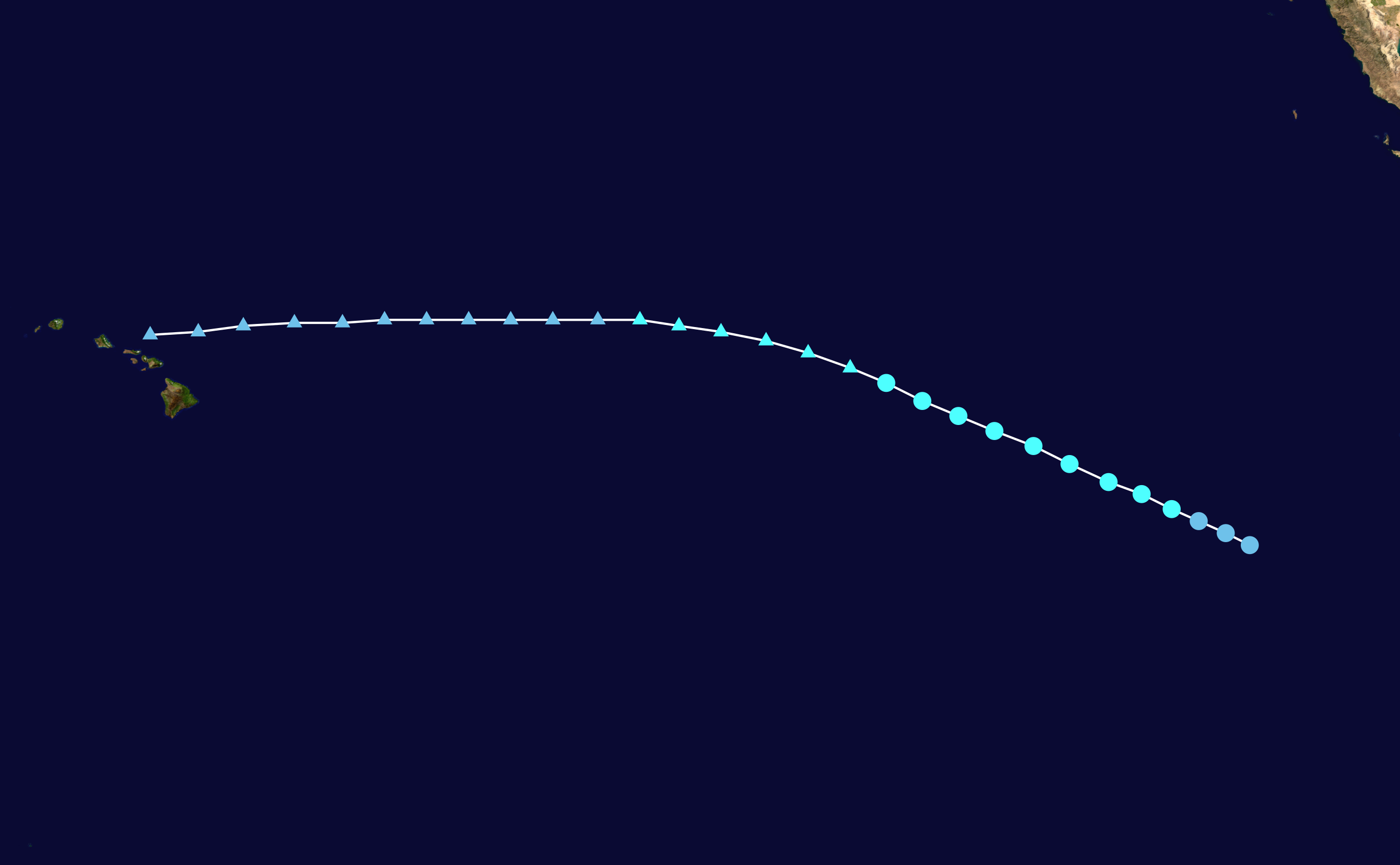
- Duration: July 31 – August 3
- Peak intensity: 60 mph (95 km/h) (1-min); 998 mbar (hPa)

On July 29, the NHC noted that an area of low pressure was forecast to form well south of Mexico. A large mass of convection developed south of Acapulco, Mexico two days later, eventually coalescing into the record-tying eighth tropical cyclone to form in the East Pacific during the month of July. The depression intensified into Tropical Storm Howard by 09:00 UTC on August 1, and although the cyclone struggled with westerly wind shear and upwelling, it ultimately attained peak winds of 60 mph (95 km/h) a day later. Continuing on its west-northwest path, Howard entered cooler waters and a more stable environment, and the combination of the two factors caused the cyclone to degenerate into a remnant low well west of Baja California by 21:00 UTC on August 3. The remnants of the system moved across the main Hawaiian Island group on August 7, dropping up to 2 in (51 mm) of rain over portions of Kauai, Oahu, and Maui, with minor flooding occurring on northwestern Oahu and northern sections of Maui.

=== Tropical Storm Ivette ===
- Tropical storm (SSHWS)
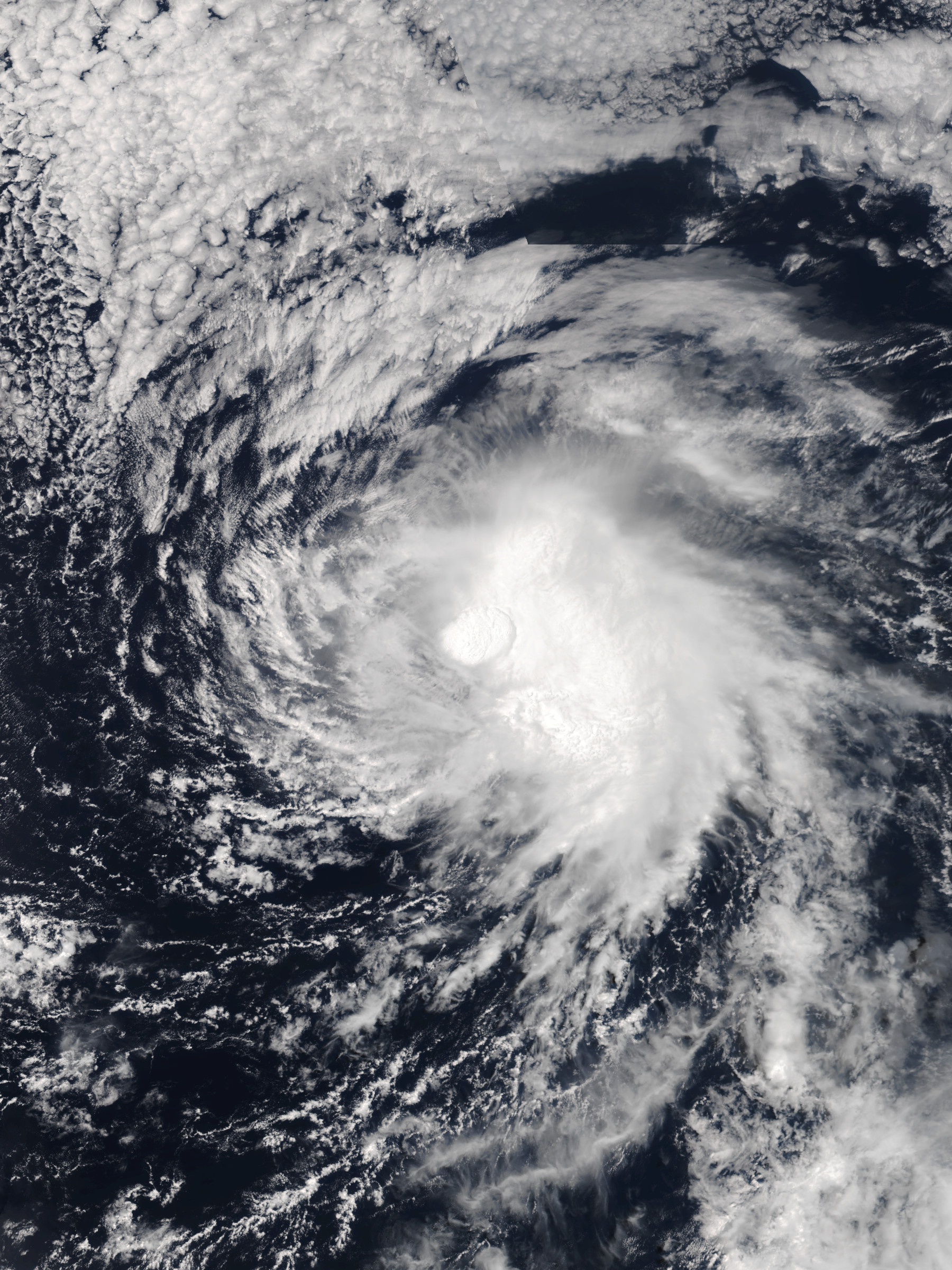
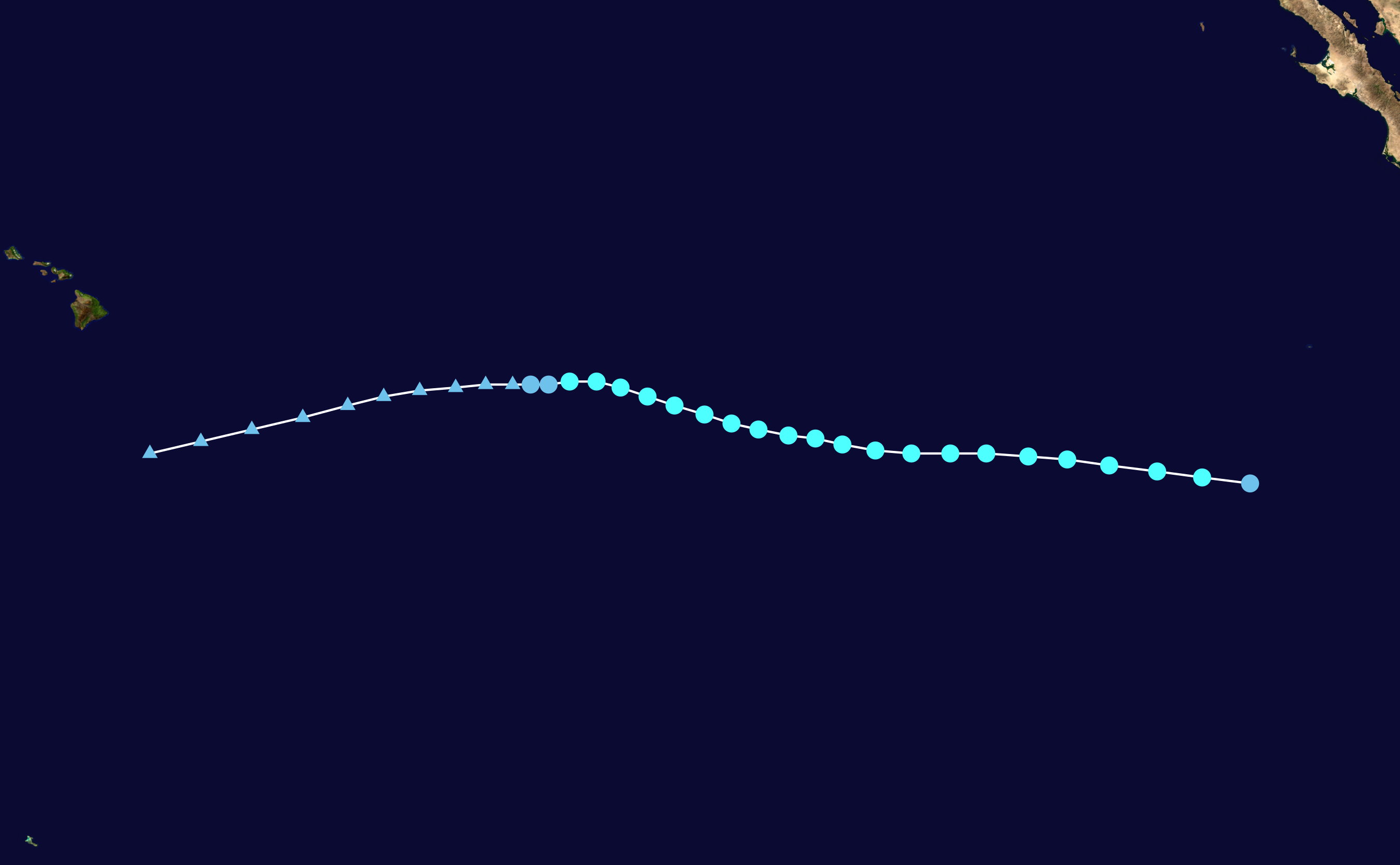
- Duration: August 2 – August 8
- Peak intensity: 60 mph (95 km/h) (1-min); 1000 mbar (hPa)

On July 25, the NHC highlighted an area well southwest of Baja California for potential tropical cyclogenesis over the following week. A broad area of low pressure formed south of Manzanillo, Mexico two days later, eventually gaining ample organization to be declared a tropical depression by 21:00 UTC on August 2. The depression was upgraded to Tropical Storm Ivette twelve hours later as banding increased. Despite initial forecasts calling for a strong Category 1 hurricane, moderate wind shear only allowed the cyclone to attain peak winds of 60 mph (95 km/h). Continued wind shear and a more stable environment caused Ivette to weaken to a tropical depression by 03:00 UTC on August 8 as it entered the Central Pacific; 18 hours later, the system degenerated into a remnant low well east of Hawaii.

=== Tropical Storm Javier ===
- Tropical storm (SSHWS)
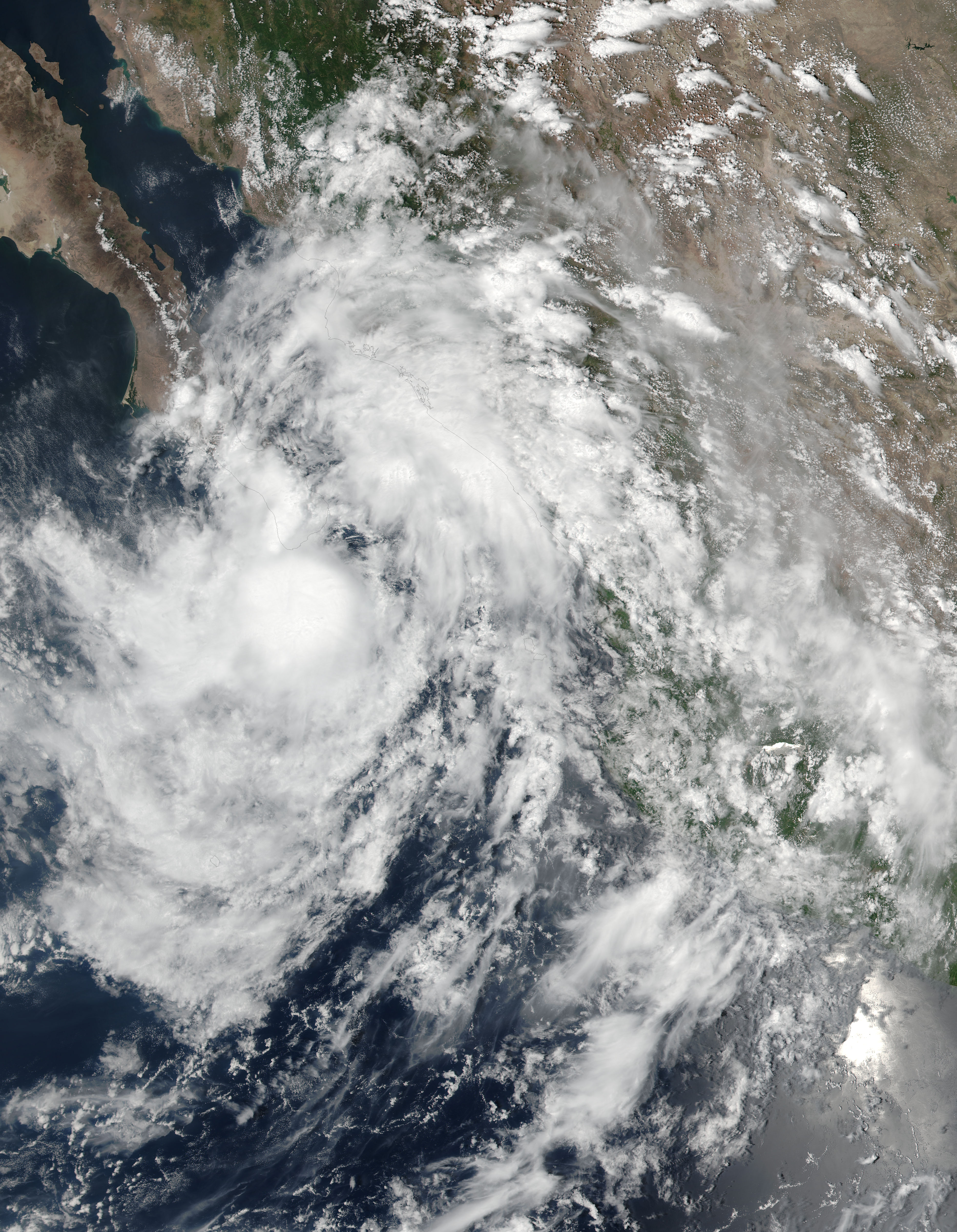
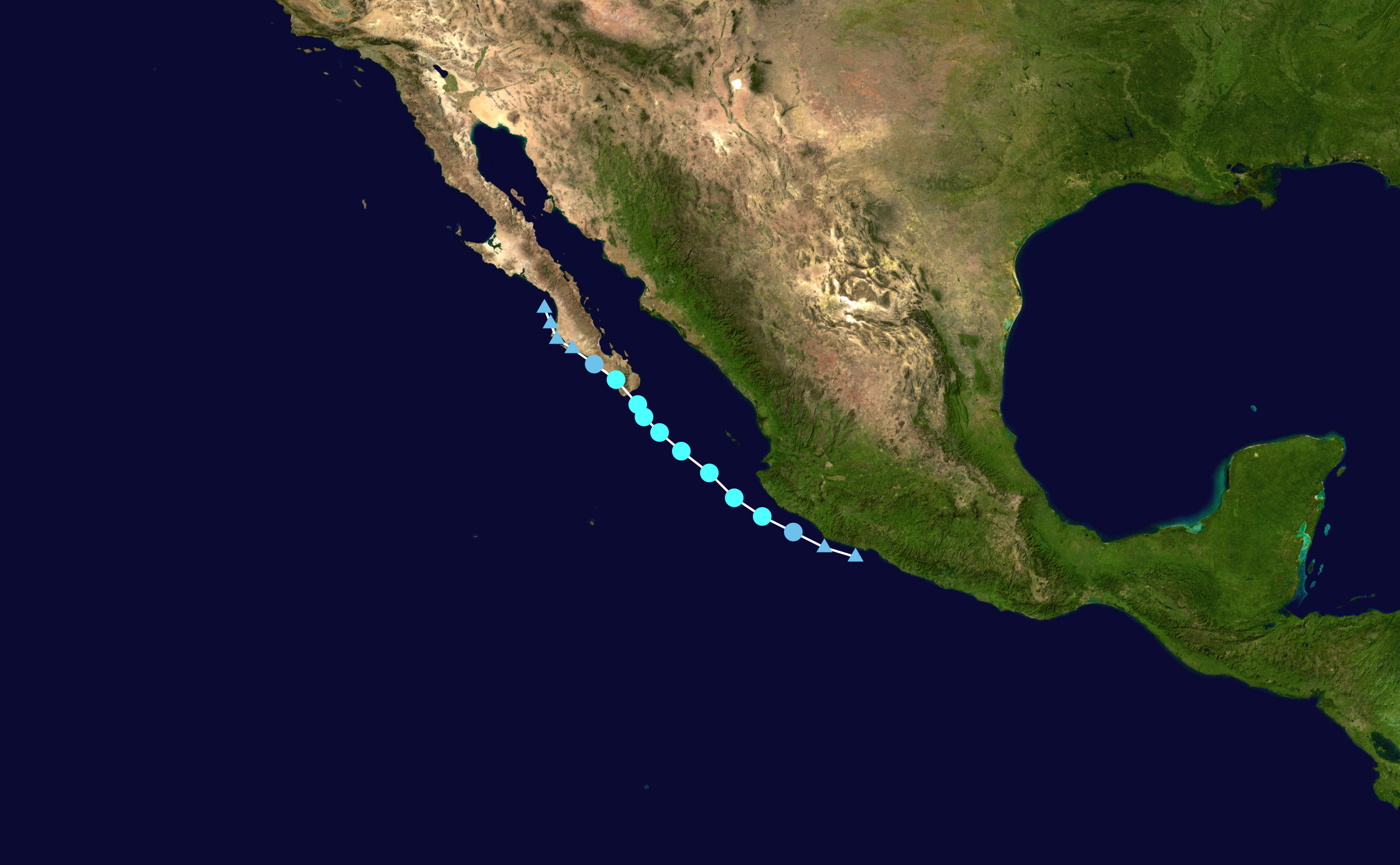
- Duration: August 7 – August 9
- Peak intensity: 65 mph (100 km/h) (1-min); 997 mbar (hPa)

On August 2, the NHC noted that an area of low pressure in association with the remnants of Hurricane Earl could further develop into a tropical cyclone off the southwestern coastline of Mexico over subsequent days. An area of disturbed weather formed south of the Gulf of Tehuantepec two days later, eventually acquiring sufficient organization to be declared a tropical depression by 06:00 UTC on August 7. Surface observations from Manzanillo, Mexico by 16:00 UTC indicated that the depression had intensified into Tropical Storm Javier. Steered northwest by a mid-level ridge over Texas, Javier initially struggled to intensify as a result of easterly wind shear; by August 8, however, a reconnaissance aircraft found that the cyclone had strengthened to reach peak winds of 65 mph (105 km/h). Drier air, increased wind shear, and land interaction caused Javier to quickly weaken thereafter; wind speeds had dropped to 50 mph (80 km/h) when Javier made landfall near San José del Cabo the next day at 03:30 UTC. Javier weakened to a tropical depression by 12:00 UTC that day and degenerated to a remnant low six hours later. The circulation of Javier dissipated late on August 10.

The outer fringes of the storm brought flooding to Colima. Landslides occurred along Lázaro Cárdenas and Mexican Federal Highway 200. In Manzanillo, a bridge collapsed and numerous federal highways were damaged while the city's port closed due to high waves. Shortly after attaining tropical storm status, a "green" alert was issued for the multiplicity of Los Cabos. Officials opened 18 shelters across the southern Baja California Peninsula, while also closing ports. When Javier was forecast to become a hurricane, an "orange" alert was issued for the entire state of Baja California Sur. In the municipalities of La Paz and Los Cabos, authorities delayed the start of the school year. Six flights were canceled to and from San José del Cabo. In Sonora, a "blue" alert was declared.

=== Tropical Storm Kay ===
- Tropical storm (SSHWS)
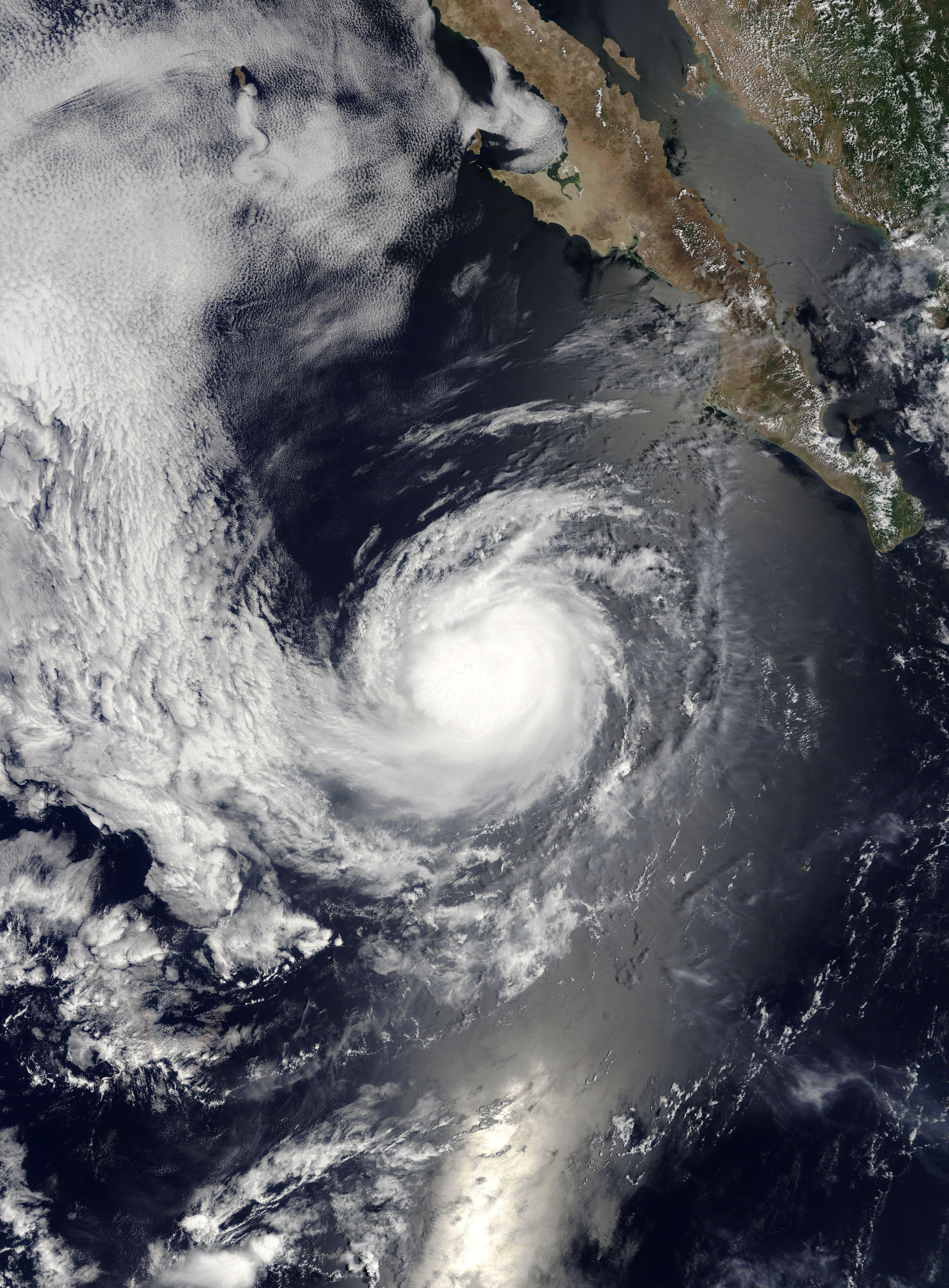
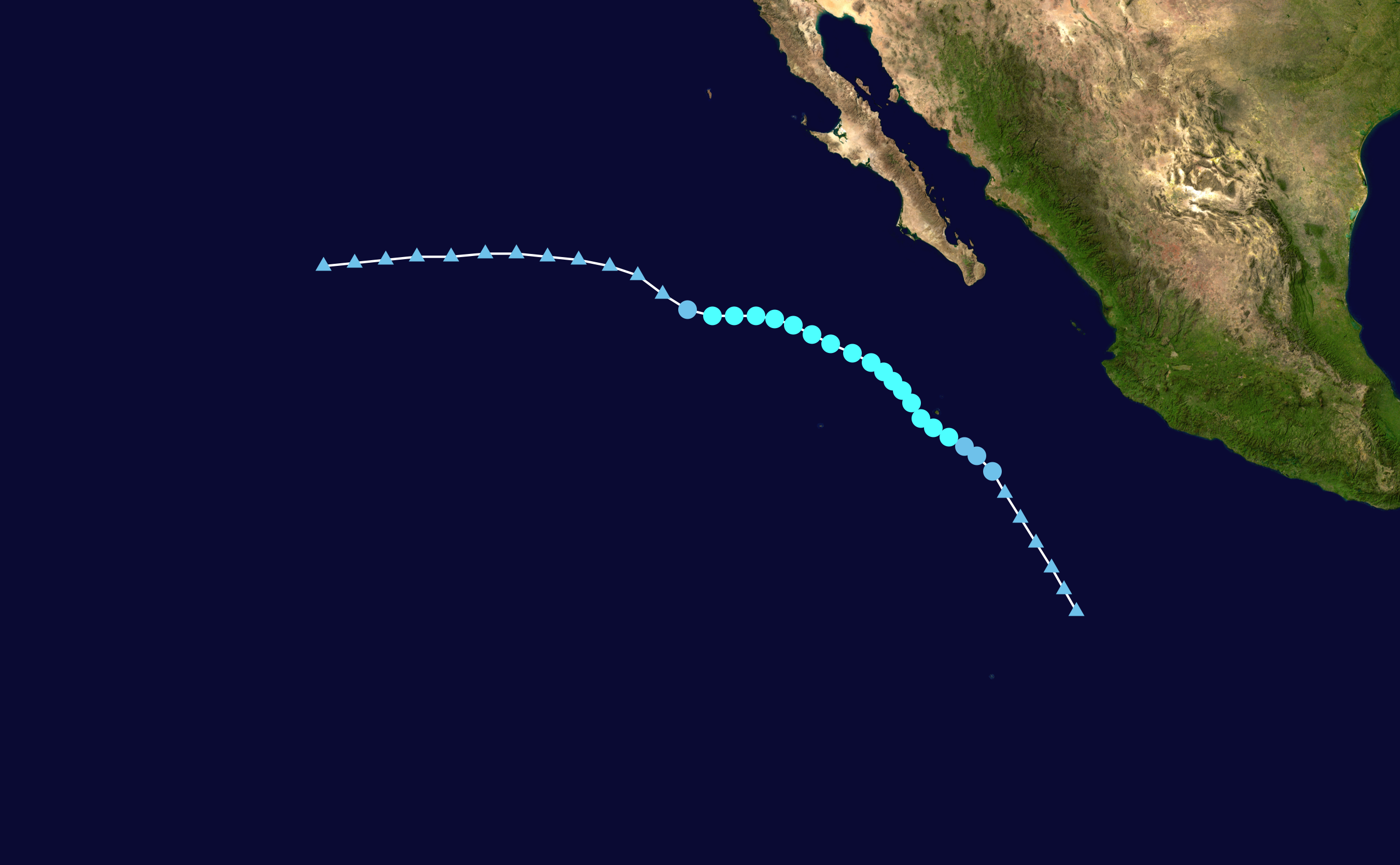
- Duration: August 18 – August 23
- Peak intensity: 50 mph (85 km/h) (1-min); 1000 mbar (hPa)

Late on August 15, the NHC began highlighting an area south of Baja California for the potential for tropical cyclone development over the subsequent week. A broad area of low pressure developed well south of Manzanillo, Mexico the following day, steadily organizing to be deemed a tropical depression by 21:00 UTC on August 18. Despite modest northeasterly shear, the depression intensified into Tropical Storm Kay twelve hours later on its northwesterly trek. While easterly shear osculated in strength, Kay peaked with winds of 50 mph, after a microwave data indicated the development of a mid level-eye. Soon after, however the separation between the mid and lower level centers caused Kay to become disorganized. The next day, Kay re-intensified, again reaching peak intensity. The peak did not last for long, as Kay entered water cooler than 26 °C later that day. Drier air and a stable environment weakened Kay into a depression by 1200 UTC on the 23rd, before Kay ultimately degenerated into a remnant low soon after. The low continued westwards, before dissipating about 585 miles west of Cabo San Lucas.

=== Hurricane Lester ===
- Category 4 hurricane (SSHWS)
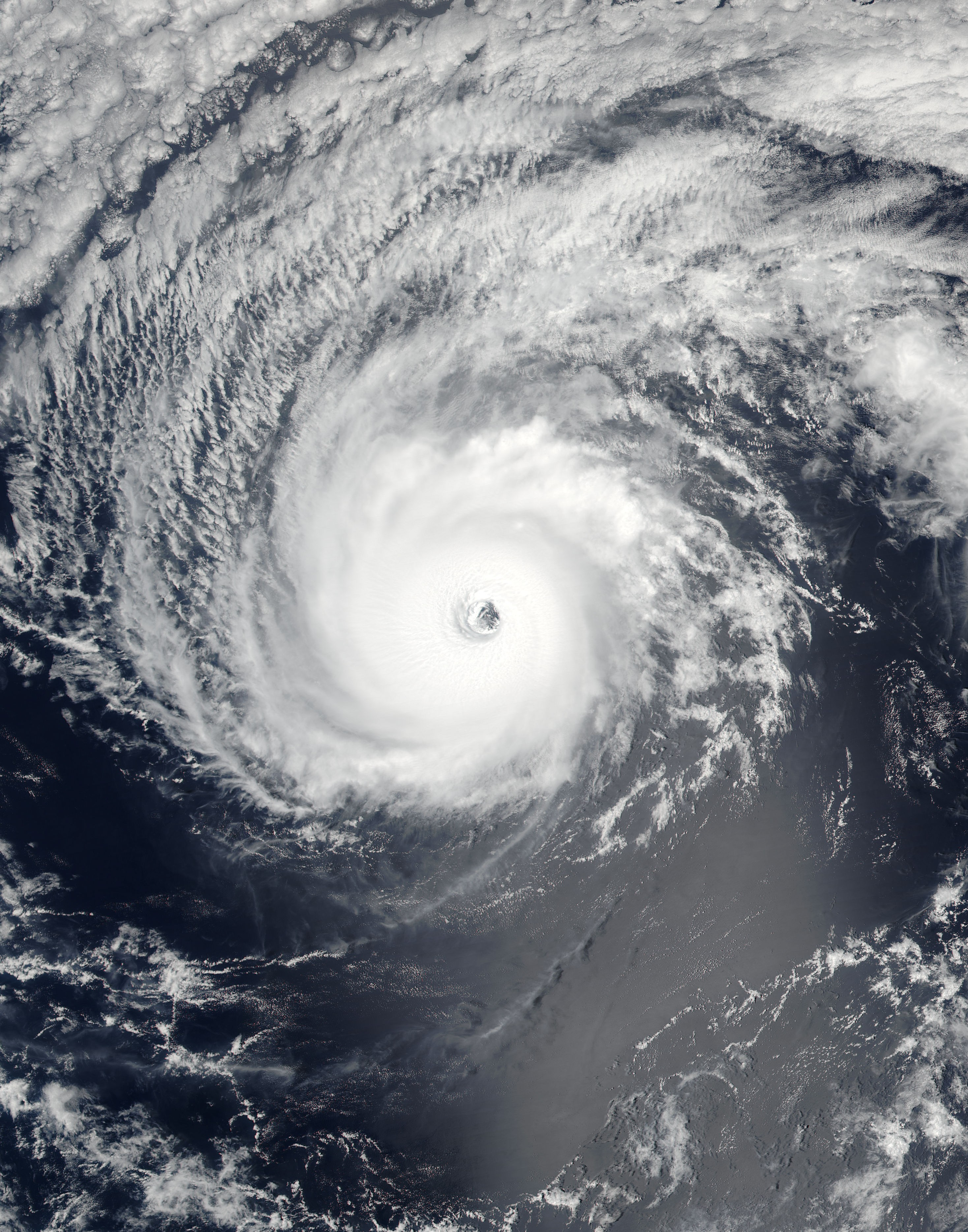
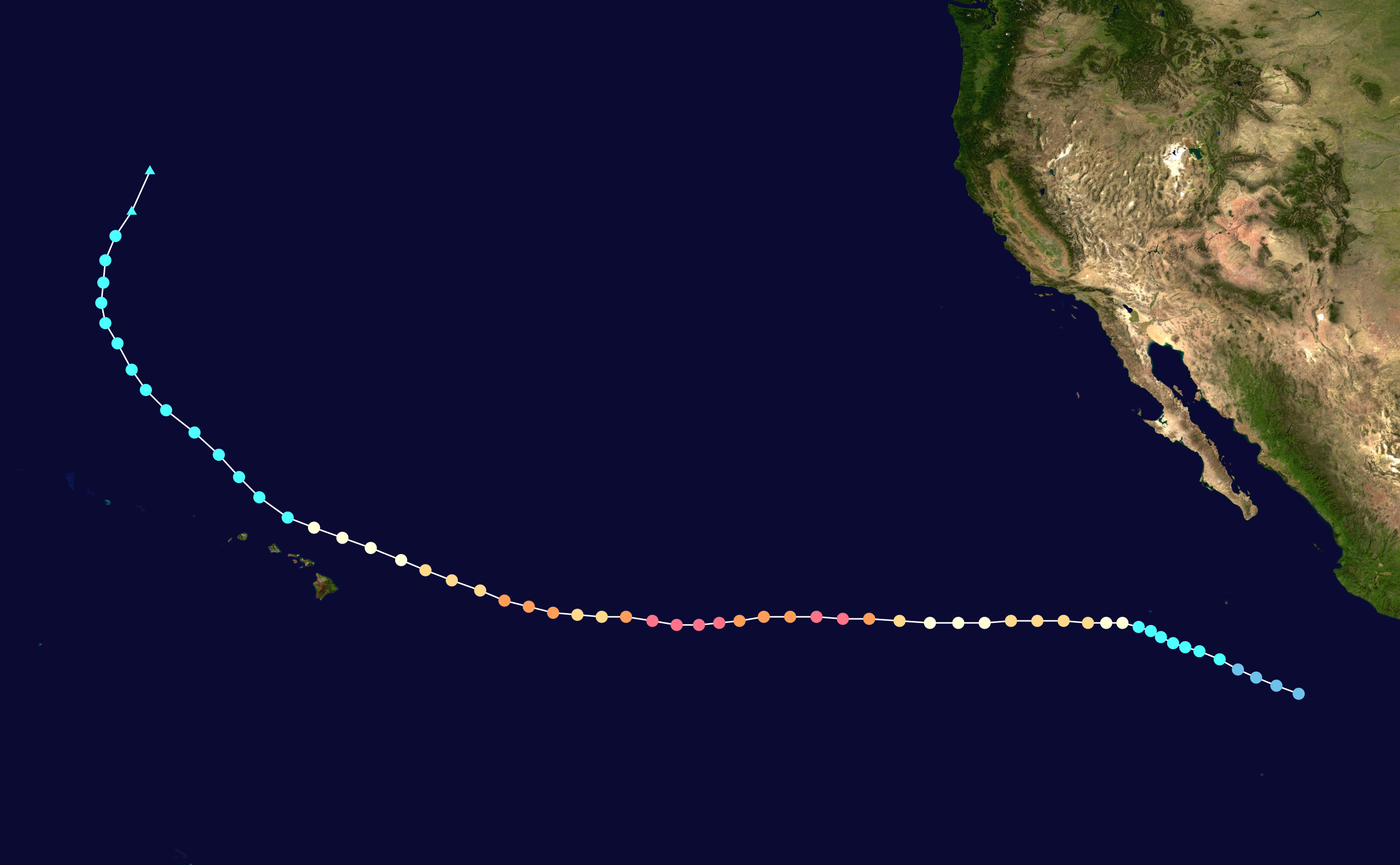
- Duration: August 24 – September 7
- Peak intensity: 145 mph (230 km/h) (1-min); 944 mbar (hPa)

A tropical wave departed from the west coast on Africa on August 11. Days later, on August 24, a well organized low-pressure system was upgraded into Tropical Depression Thirteen-E. Entering a favorable environment, the depression quickly intensified into Tropical Storm Lester. Moving steadily west-northwestwards, intensification continued, and Lester rapidly intensified on August 26 into a hurricane. Intensification continued throughout the day, with Lester reaching Category 2 strength the following day. By August 29, Lester had strengthened into the fourth major hurricane of the season. On August 30, Lester started to go through a weakening stage, at which point the storm began accelerating towards Hawaii. Late on August 30 Lester re-intensified to a Category 4 hurricane. The storm did not maintain this intensity, however, and on the next day dropped below major hurricane status as its eye filled with clouds. On September 1, Lester's eye cleared, and it once again became a Category 3 hurricane. Lester also moved very close to the Hawaiian islands, but passed safely to the east and quickly lost strength over cooler waters.

The outer rainbands from Lester produced heavy showers and minor flooding over the leeward slopes of the Big Island and portions of east Maui on September 3. Winds were light, however. But, no major damages was done by the result of that hurricane. There were some impacts from Lester in the Hawaiian Islands while the hurricane passed north of the state. Large swell generated by the hurricane resulted in surf of 10 to 20 feet along the eastern facing shores of the islands. Lifeguards conducted numerous water rescues, but there were no reports of serious injuries.

=== Hurricane Madeline ===
- Category 4 hurricane (SSHWS)
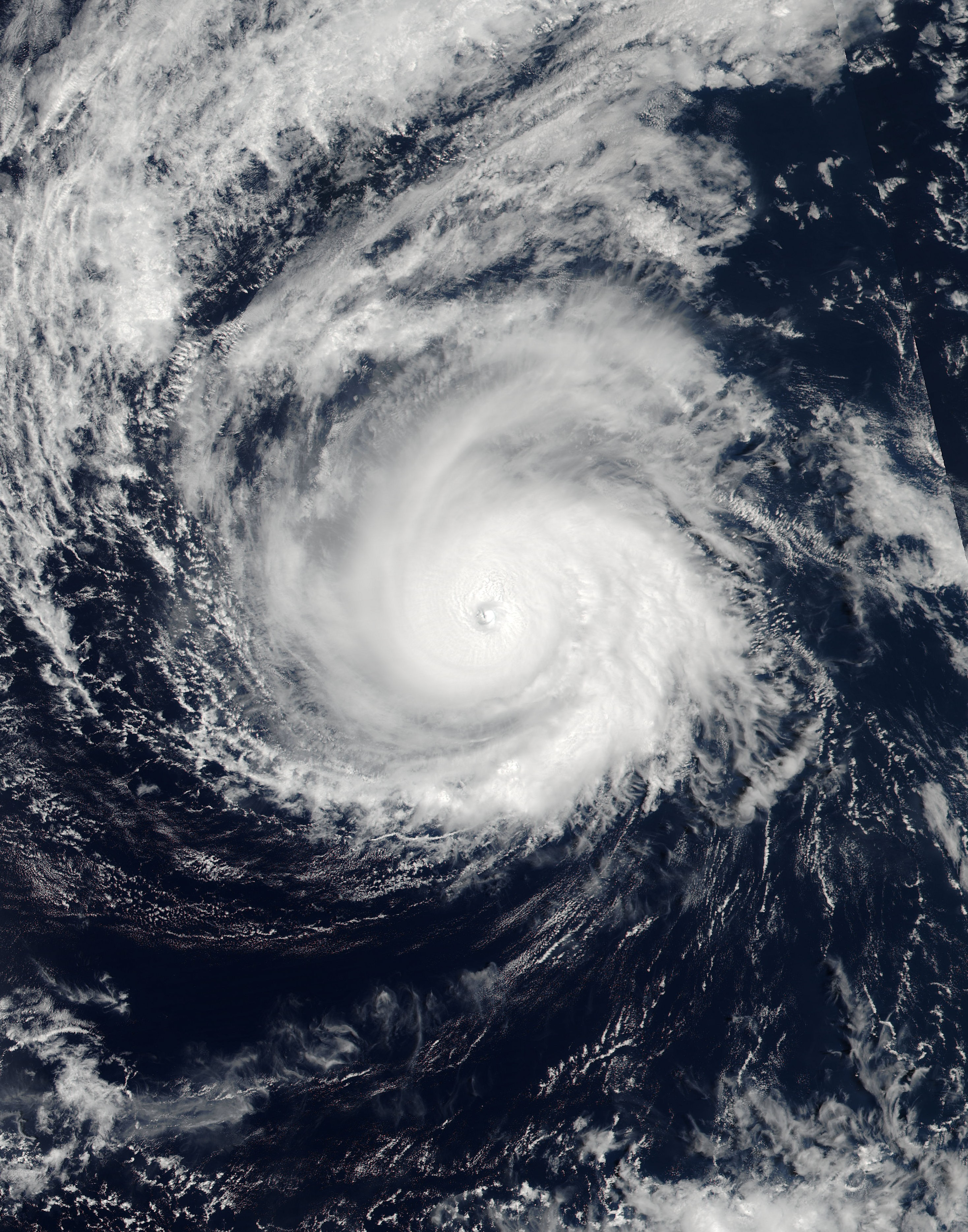
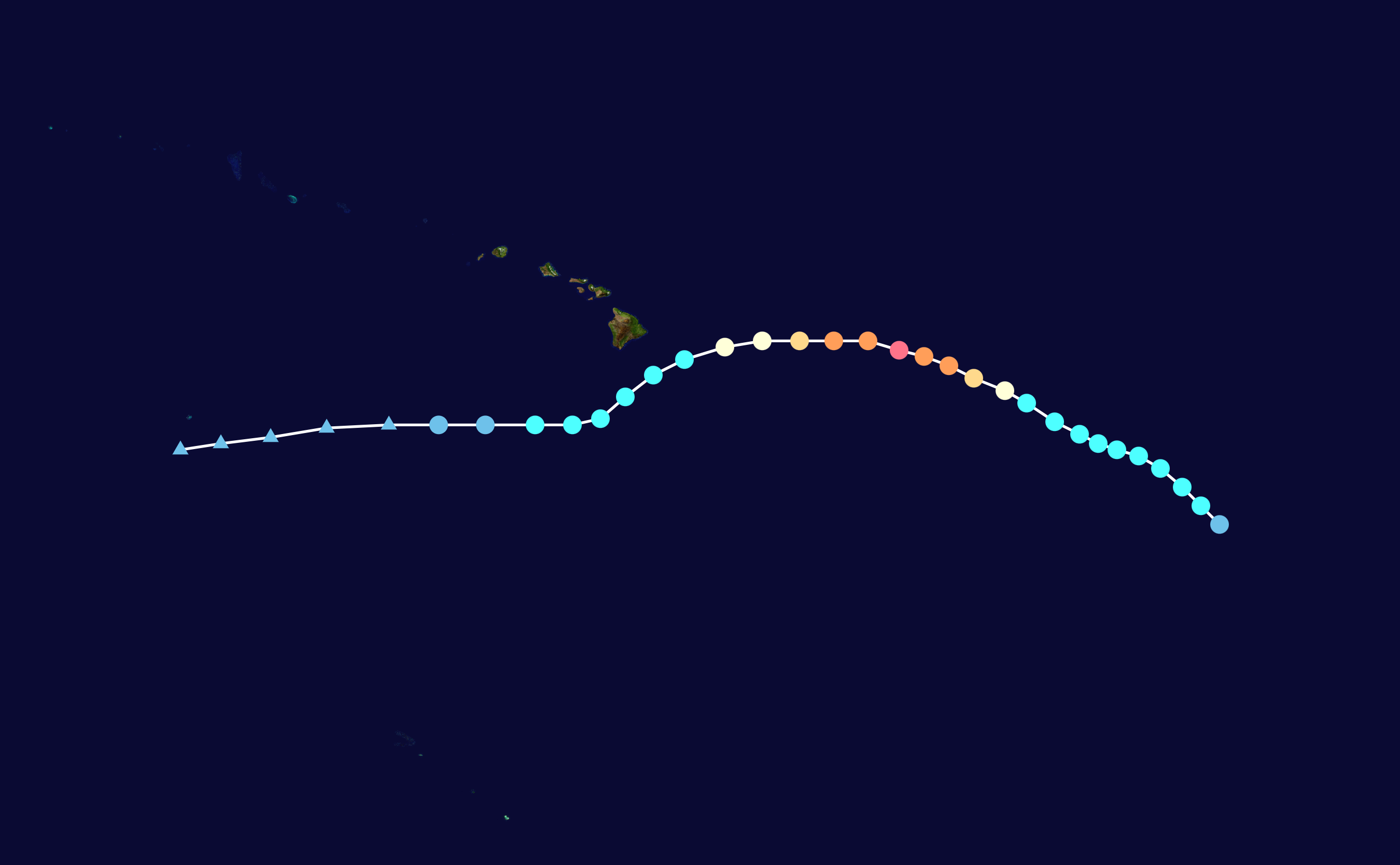
- Duration: August 26 – September 2
- Peak intensity: 130 mph (215 km/h) (1-min); 950 mbar (hPa)

On August 22, the National Hurricane Center began to monitor a broad area of low pressure that formed about 1,000 mi (1,600 km) south-southwest of the southern tip of Baja California. Over the next few days, the disturbance gradually organized as it tracked westward across the Pacific. Thunderstorm activity increased early on August 25. Late on August 26, it developed into Tropical Depression Fourteen-E about 1,125 miles (1,811 km) east-southeast of the Big Island of Hawaii. It quickly intensified into Tropical Storm Madeline, as banding features increased. The storm moved northwestward due to a ridge to its northeast. Madeline strengthened slowly in an environment of moderate wind shear. Early on August 28, it crossed 140°W into the Central Pacific. A day later, the storm began rapidly intensifying over warm waters and low wind shear, as an eye feature developed. Madeline attained hurricane status at 09:00 UTC on August 29, and reached major hurricane status 12 hours later. On August 30, Madeline peaked as a Category 4 hurricane, with winds of 130 mph (210 km/h) and a minimum pressure of 950 millibars (28 inHg). Around that time, the hurricane turned to the west and later southwest due to the ridge building southward. Late on August 30, wind shear increased due to a trough near Hawaii, which caused the hurricane to weaken. On September 1, Madeline weakened into a tropical storm, and soon after to a tropical depression, as the circulation became exposed from the convection. Late on September 2, Madeline opened up into a trough of low pressure south-southwest of Hawaii.

The threat of Madeline led to a hurricane warning for the Big Island of Hawaii, as well as tropical storm warnings for Maui. Governor of Hawaii David Ige declared a state of emergency on August 30 as Madeline approached, subsequently citing that an emergency relief period be in effect from August 31 to September 9, in preparation of a possible impact from Hurricane Lester. More than a dozen emergency shelters were opened by the American Red Cross of Hawaii. All public schools were closed on the Big Island as Madeline approached. Madeline produced heavy rain and gusty winds on the Big Island. In multiple locations, wind gusts exceeded 40 mph (64 km/h), the highest reported being in Waimea, which recorded a peak gust of 60 mph (97 km/h). Total rainfall accumulations amounted up to 5–11 inches (13–28 centimetres) across the Big Island. A few low-lying, flood-prone roads in Hilo were inundated briefly.

=== Hurricane Newton ===
- Category 1 hurricane (SSHWS)
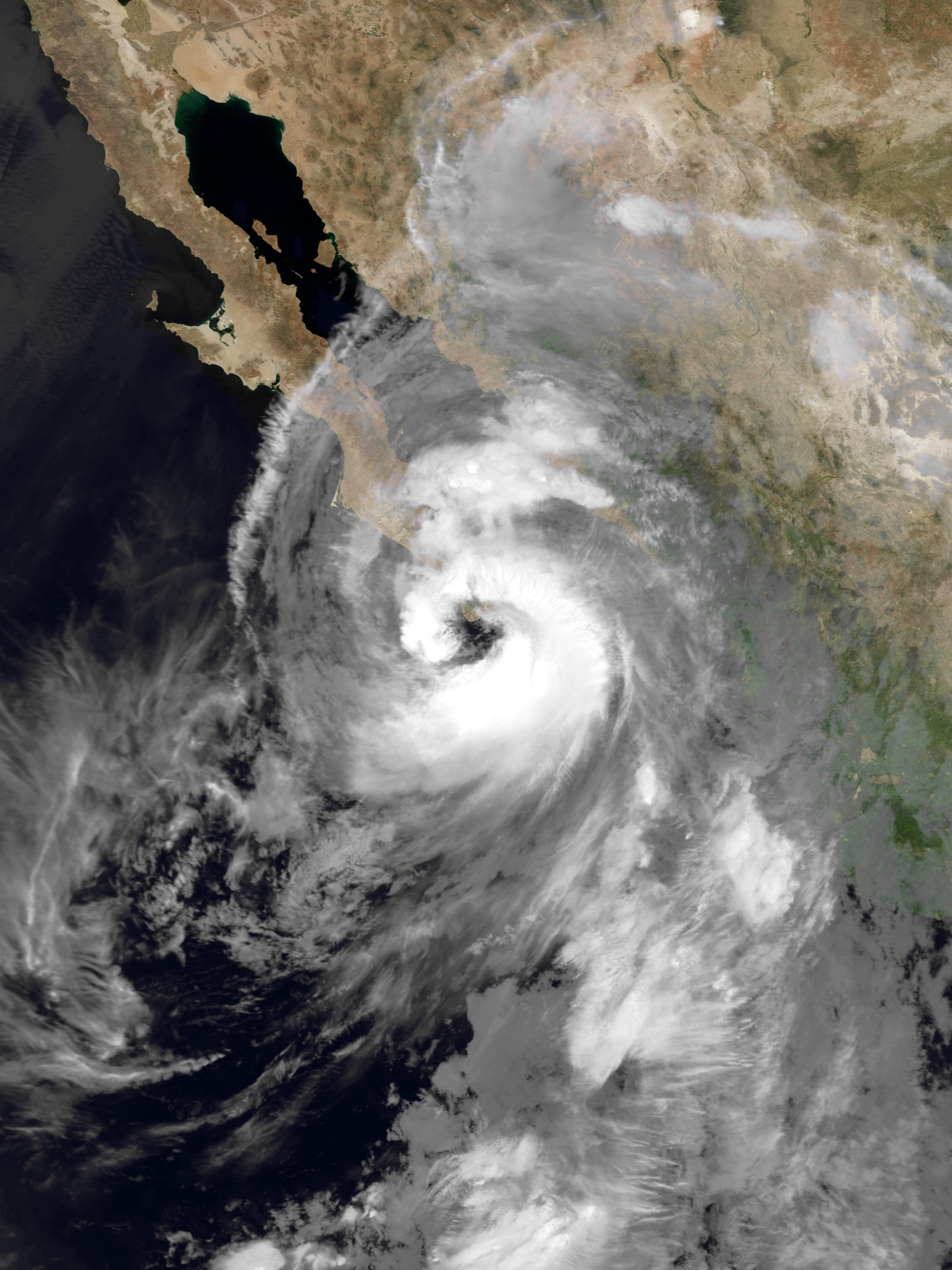
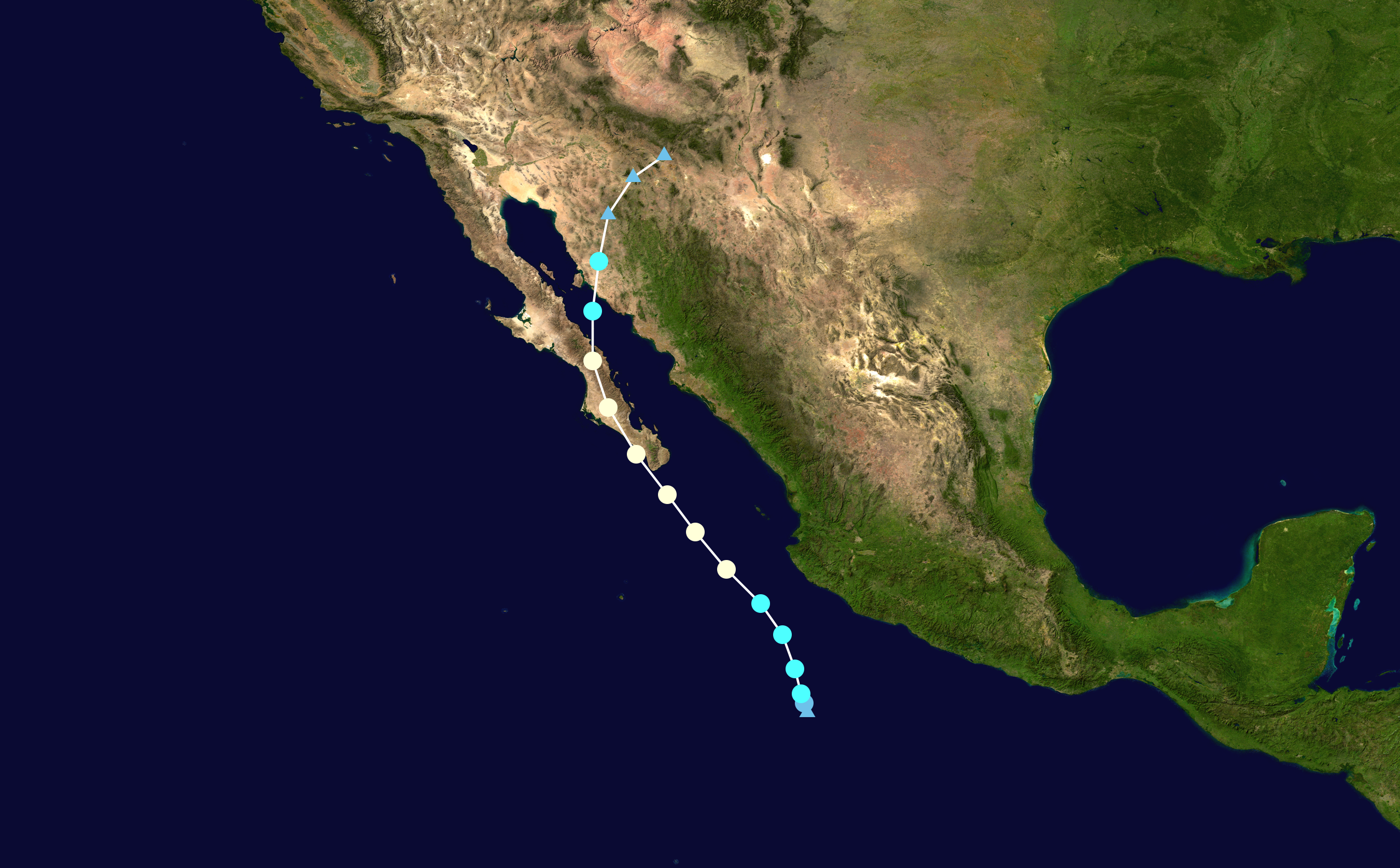
- Duration: September 4 – September 7
- Peak intensity: 90 mph (150 km/h) (1-min); 977 mbar (hPa)

On August 27, the National Hurricane Center (NHC) first mentioned the potential for low-pressure area to develop south of Mexico as an area for tropical cyclogenesis. An area of disturbed weather formed on August 31 offshore western Guatemala, which developed into a low-level trough the next day. Favorable environmental conditions allowed the system to organize and develop a distinct low-pressure area on September 2, which produced a widespread area of disorganized thunderstorms. A circulation began organizing within the system, leading to the NHC classifying it as Tropical Depression Fifteen-E late on September 4 about 220 mi (355 km) southwest of Manzanillo, Colima.

With warm waters, moderate wind shear, and adequate moisture, the system continued to organize after formation, strengthening to Tropical Storm Newton by early on September 5. The storm moved northwestward, steered by a ridge that over Texas. Late on September 5, an eye was visible on satellite imagery, and the hurricane hunters observed flight-level winds of 85 mph (135 km/h); based on these observations, the NHC upgraded Newton to hurricane status. With continued low wind shear and warm waters, Newton intensified further to a peak intensity of 90 mph (145 km/h) early on September 6. That day, the large wind field and 52 mi (84 km) eye failed to organize more, and the hurricane made landfall near Cabo San Lucas, Baja California Sur, near peak intensity like Hurricane Odile did in 2014.

Rounding the western periphery of the ridge, Newton turned northward and weakened over the Baja California Peninsula. The eyewall deteriorated and fell apart while the convection waned. On September 7, Newton made a second landfall on mainland Mexico near Bahía Kino, Sonora, and weakened to tropical storm status. The storm curved to the northeast ahead of a broad trough, with increasing wind shear exposing the center from the waning convection. At 21:00 UTC on September 7, the NHC discontinued advisories on Newton, assessing that the storm degenerated into a post-tropical cyclone before crossing into southern Arizona. The residual circulation continued northeastward, dissipating by early on September 8.

=== Hurricane Orlene ===
- Category 2 hurricane (SSHWS)
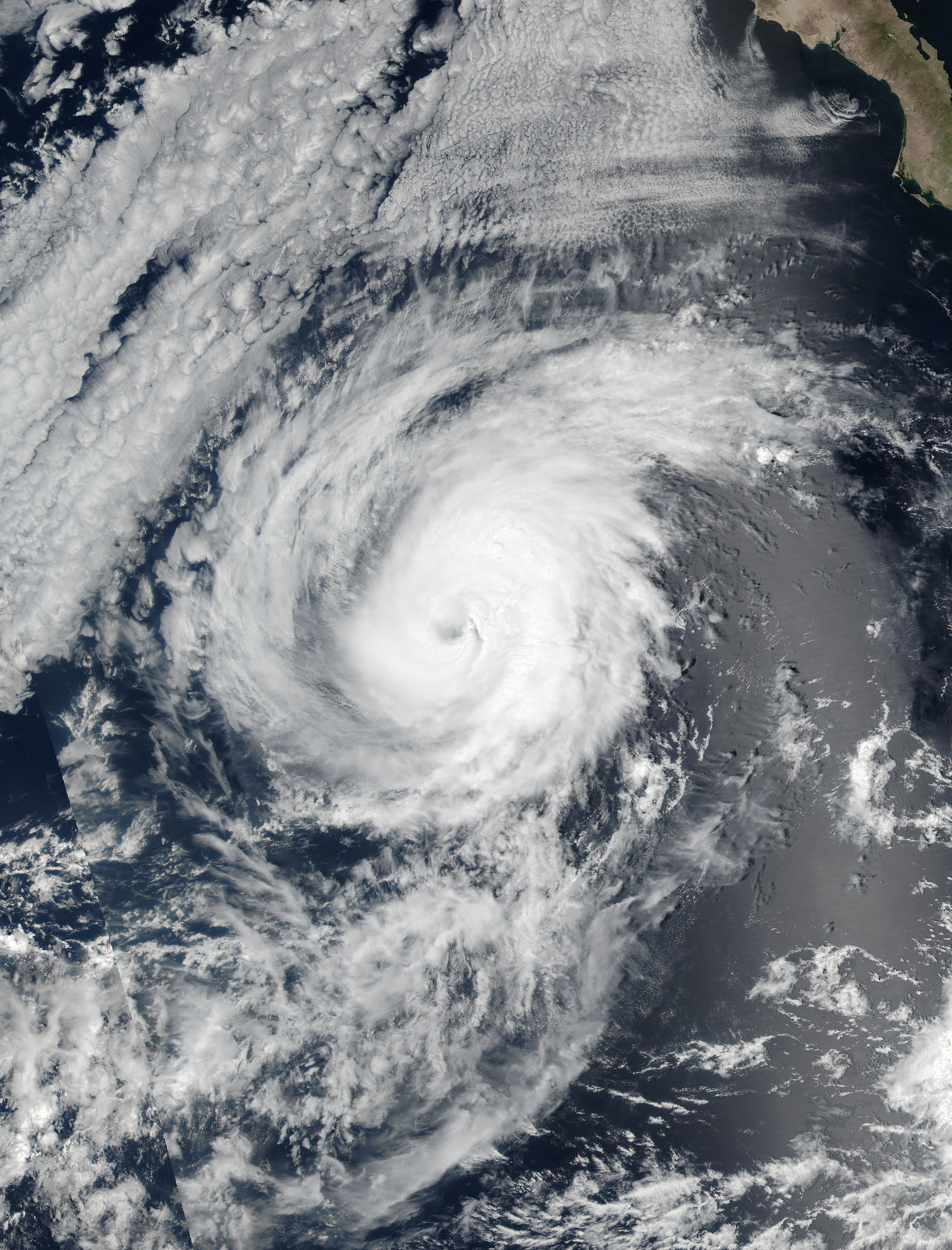
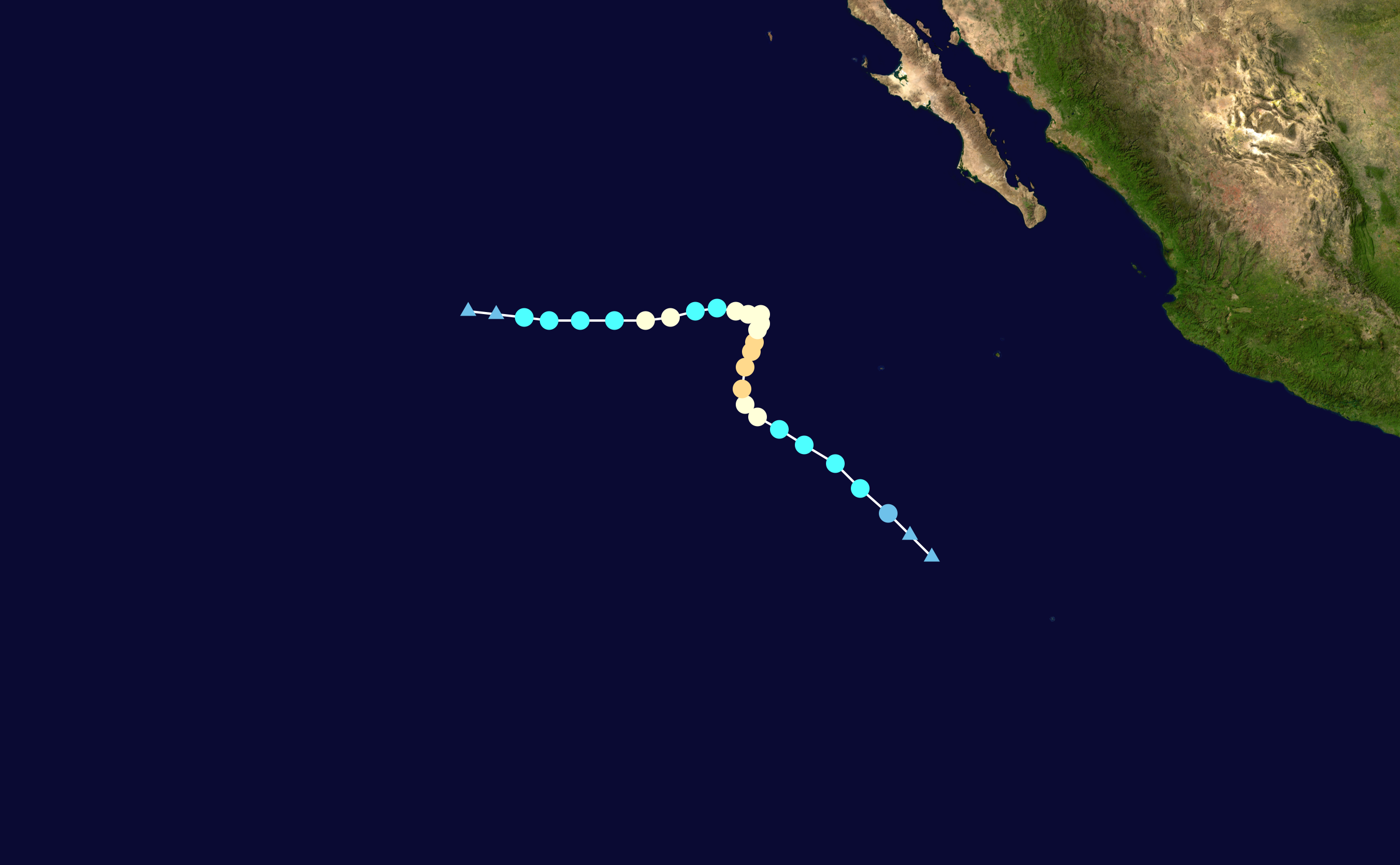
- Duration: September 11 – September 17
- Peak intensity: 110 mph (175 km/h) (1-min); 967 mbar (hPa)

On September 5, a tropical wave that had traversed the Atlantic basin moved into the Eastern Pacific. Passing south of the Gulf of Tehuantepec, the disturbance gradually organized, and by September 10, satellite images showed that a surface circulation has formed, however, thunderstorm activity was too disorganized to be classified as a tropical cyclone. It is estimated that Tropical Depression Sixteen-E formed at 00:00 UTC on September 11 about 700 miles (1,100 km) south-southwest of the southern tip of Baja California, after curved banding features developed near the center. The center became embedded in a central dense overcast, and six hours later, it was upgraded to Tropical Storm Orlene.

Moving north-northwest around a ridge of high pressure, Orlene entered an area of warm sea surface temperatures and low wind shear, prompting a period of rapid intensification as a well-defined eye became visible at the center, and Orlene became a hurricane at 06:00 UTC September 12. The hurricane eventually reached its peak intensity as a high-end Category 2 hurricane with winds of 110 mph (180 km/h) at 18:00 UTC that day. The storm then moved into an area of cooler waters, which caused Orlene to weaken back to a tropical storm as it slowed down due to a trough approaching it and eventually replaced with a ridge. It began to turn west, and re-strengthened to a hurricane again before eventually succumbing to increasing wind shear and weakening again commenced. Orlene deteriorated into a remnant low by September 17, which persisted for another 12 hours before dissipating. Trailing deep tropical moisture from the remnants of Orlene passing north of the island chain produced moderate to heavy rainfall and minor flooding along the windward slopes of Haleakalā on September 23.

=== Hurricane Paine ===
- Category 1 hurricane (SSHWS)
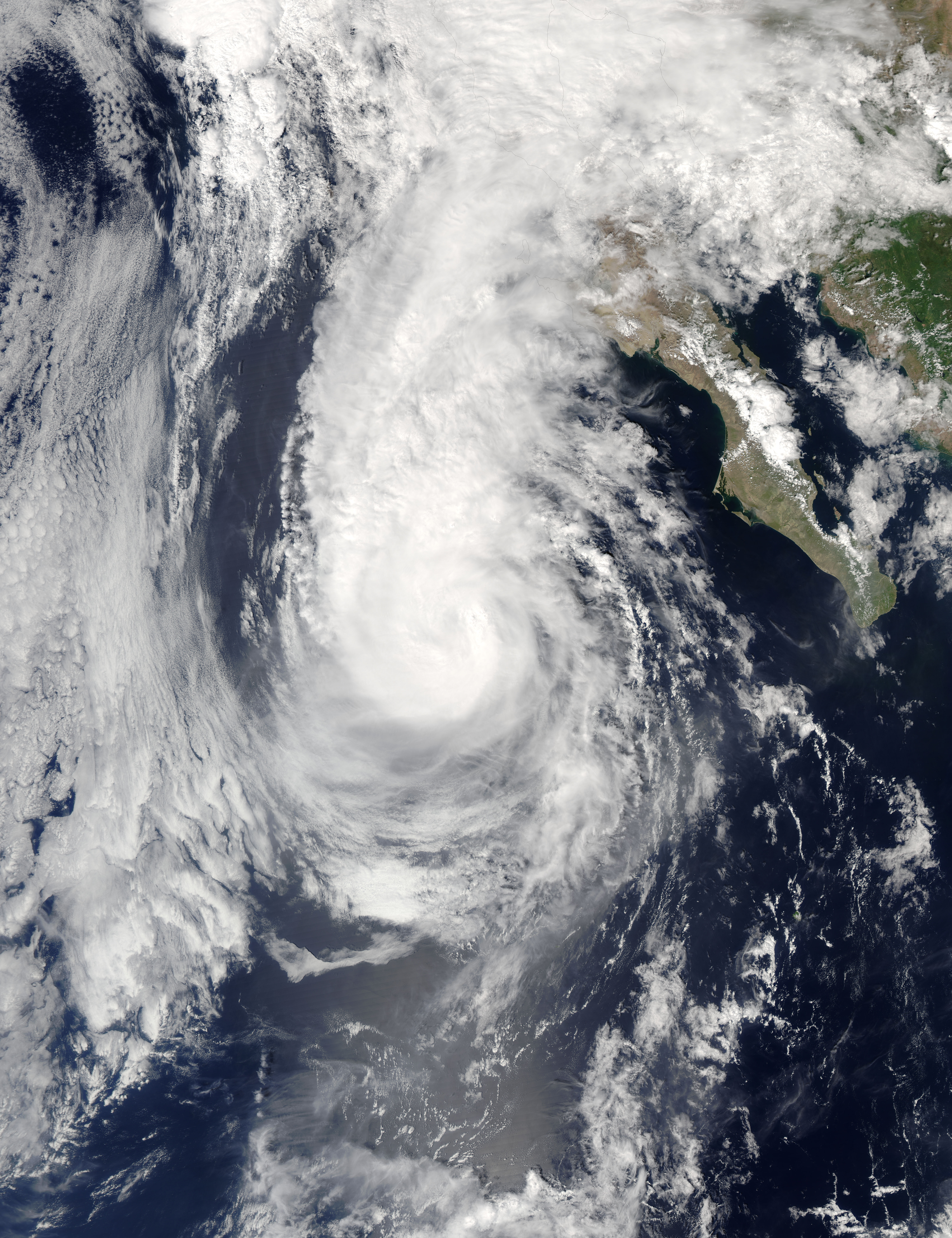
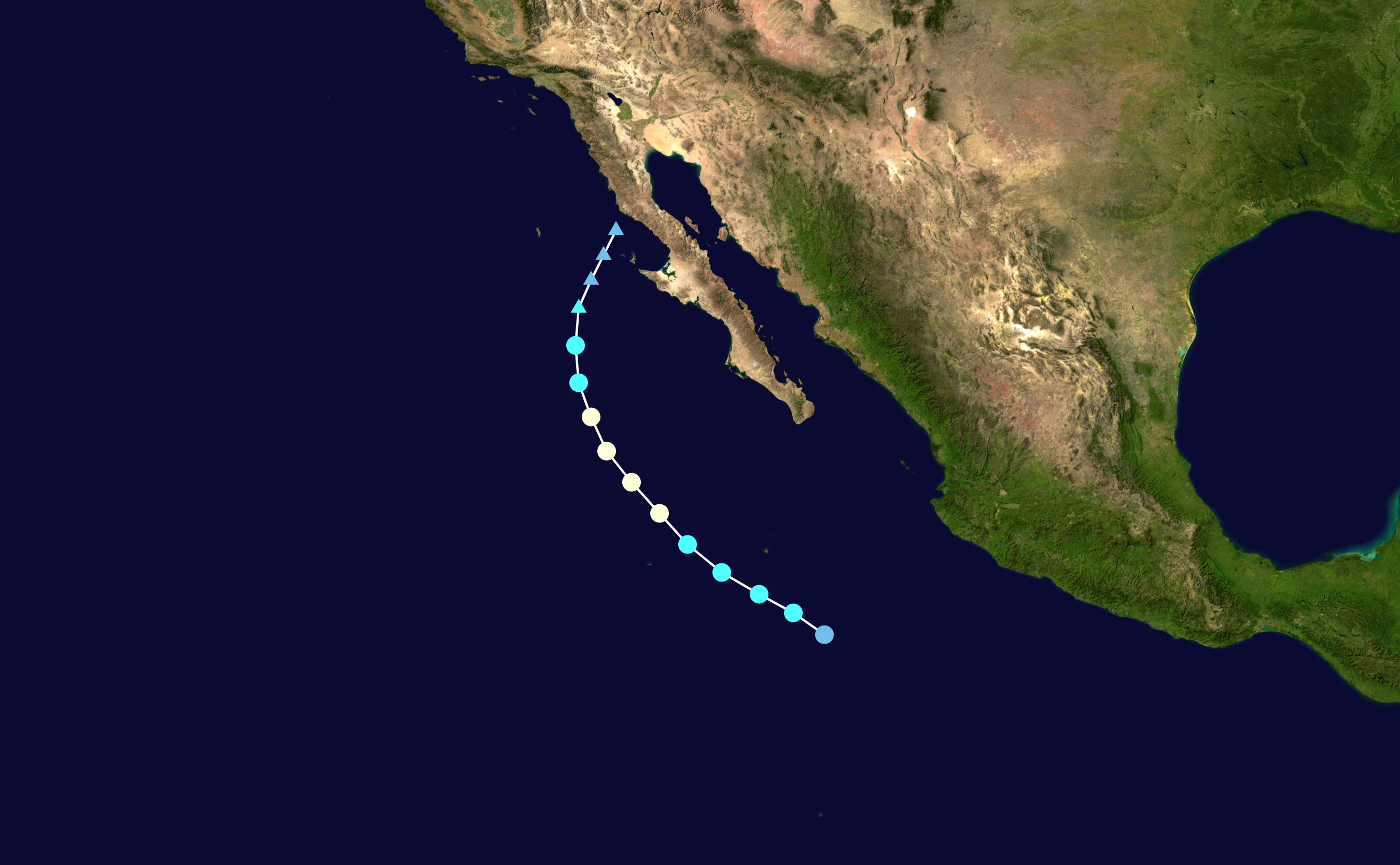
- Duration: September 18 – September 20
- Peak intensity: 90 mph (150 km/h) (1-min); 979 mbar (hPa)

The origins of Paine were complex, having originated from several tropical waves. On September 10, the first one moved into the Eastern Pacific. It moved westwards over the next few days, spawning a small area of low pressure as a result. Convection remained disorganized due to easterly wind shear, which inhibited development. By September 16, another wave which had formed overtook the small low and absorbed it into its circulation. The system became better organized with a large area of convection, but the circulation was elongated. Over the next day, wind shear decreased and convection became better organized, and it is estimated that a tropical depression formed at 00:00 UTC on September 18, about 325 miles (523 km) west-southwest of Manzanillo, Mexico, becoming a tropical storm about six hours later and assigned the name Paine.

Almost immediately, the cyclone underwent a period of rapid intensification as it moved northwestwards around the periphery of a subtropical ridge that was over Mexico. Banding features developed in association with a central dense overcast (CDO) that produced very deep convection. Early on September 19, Paine became a hurricane and shortly afterwards achieved its peak intensity around 18:00 UTC. As fast as it became a hurricane, it weakened at a similar pace due to decreasing sea surface temperatures, and Paine degraded into a remnant low only a day after reaching its peak intensity. The remnants of Paine continued to move northward, before dissipating just offshore of the Baja California Peninsula, late on September 21.

=== Tropical Storm Roslyn ===
- Tropical storm (SSHWS)
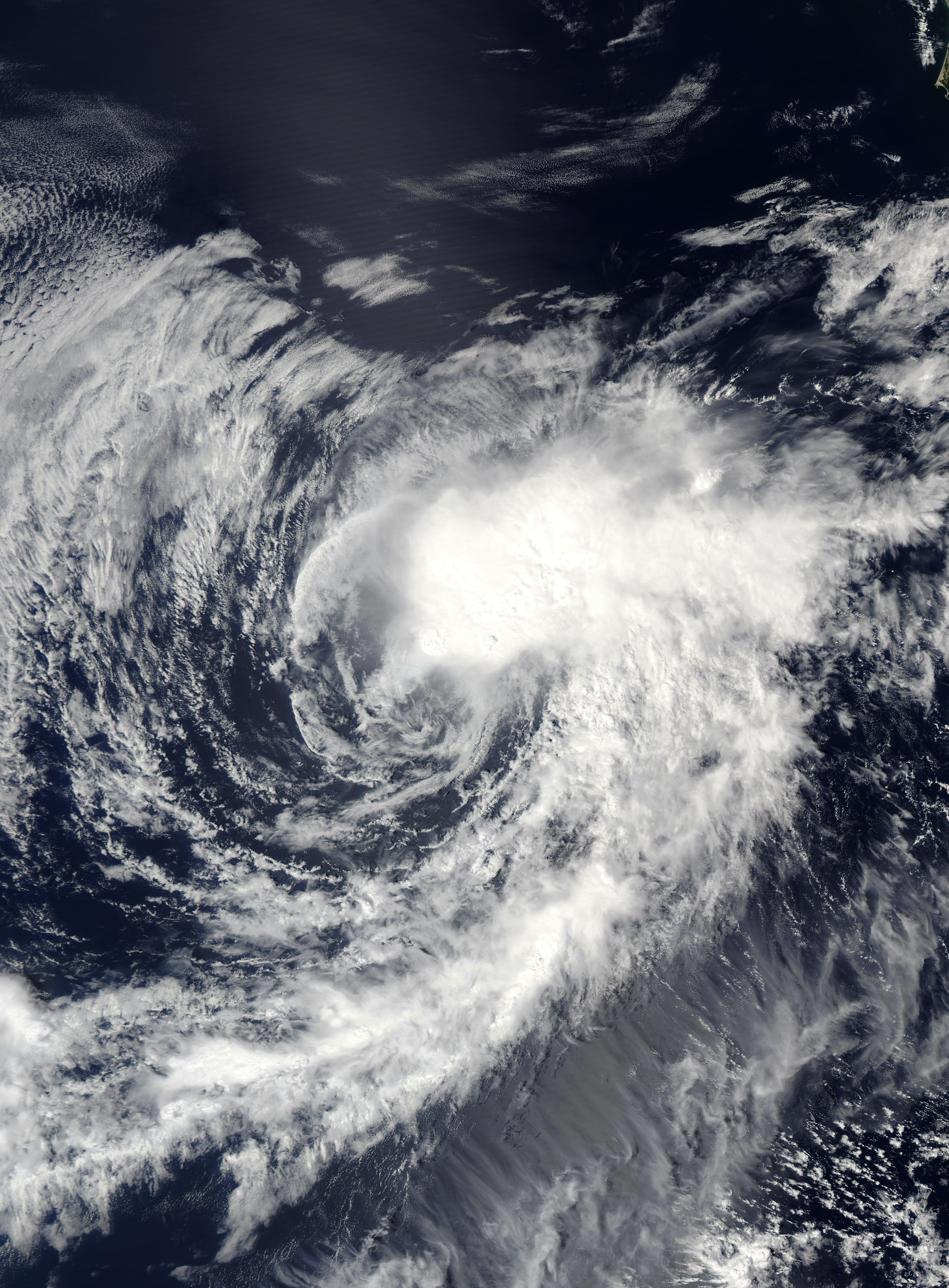
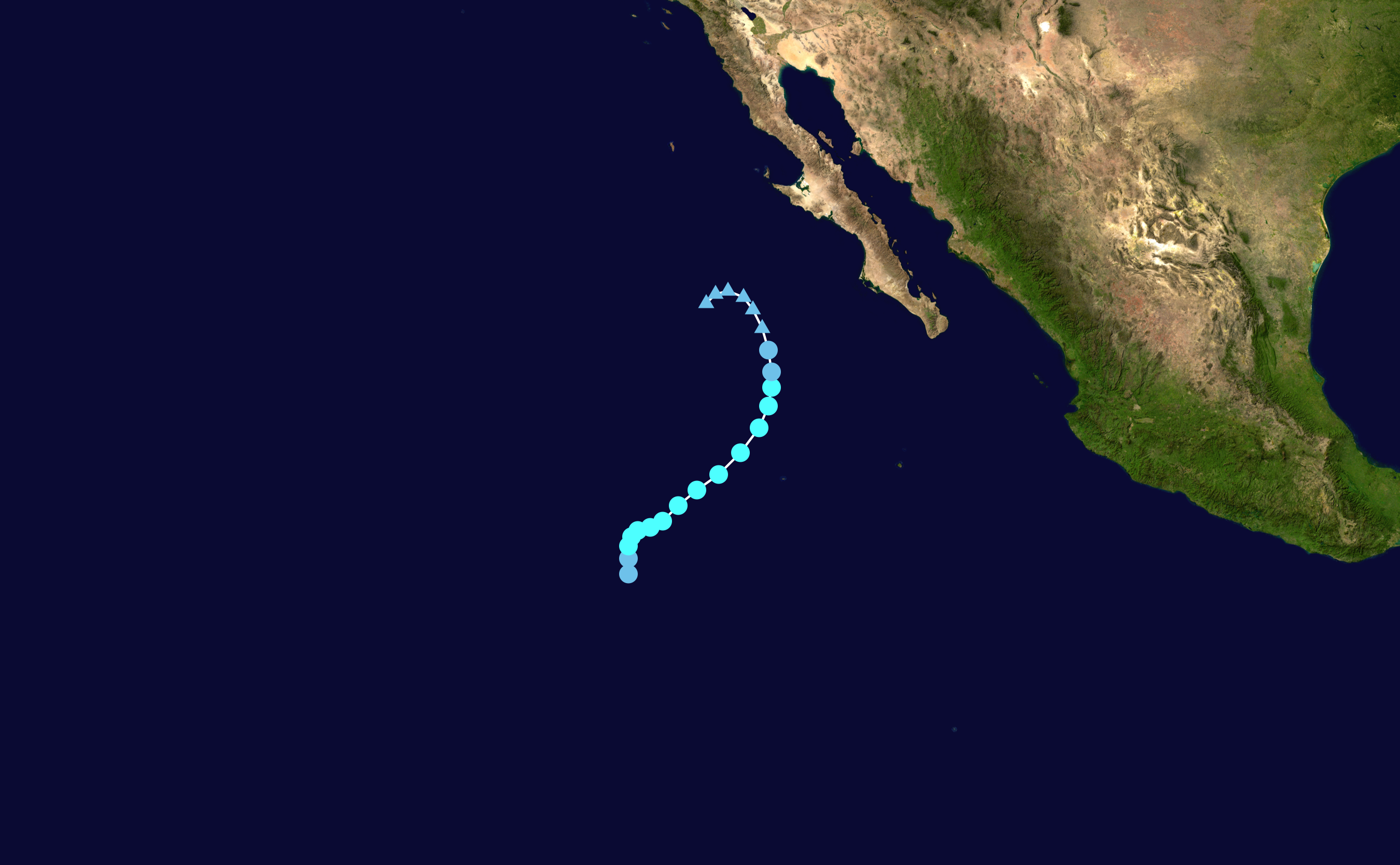
- Duration: September 25 – September 29
- Peak intensity: 50 mph (85 km/h) (1-min); 999 mbar (hPa)

A tropical wave moved into the Eastern Pacific on September 17, spawning a broad area low pressure as it moved to the west. The disturbance lacked any significant organization until September 24, when shower and thunderstorm activity became a little more organized, although the system lacked a well-defined circulation. After gradually becoming better organized, it is estimated from satellite data that a tropical depression formed at 1200 UTC about 700 miles (1,100 km) southwest of the tip of Baja California. It moved northward and was upgraded to Tropical Storm Roslyn the next day at 00:00 UTC. Moderate wind shear and dry air prevented any significant strengthening, and by 18:00 UTC it attained a peak intensity of 50 mph (80 km/h). On September 27, southwesterly wind shear started to weaken Roslyn. Weakening slowly over the next two days, Roslyn weakened to a tropical depression on September 29 and degraded to a remnant low shortly afterwards, dissipating the next day a few hundred miles west of Cabo San Lazaro.

=== Hurricane Ulika ===
- Category 1 hurricane (SSHWS)
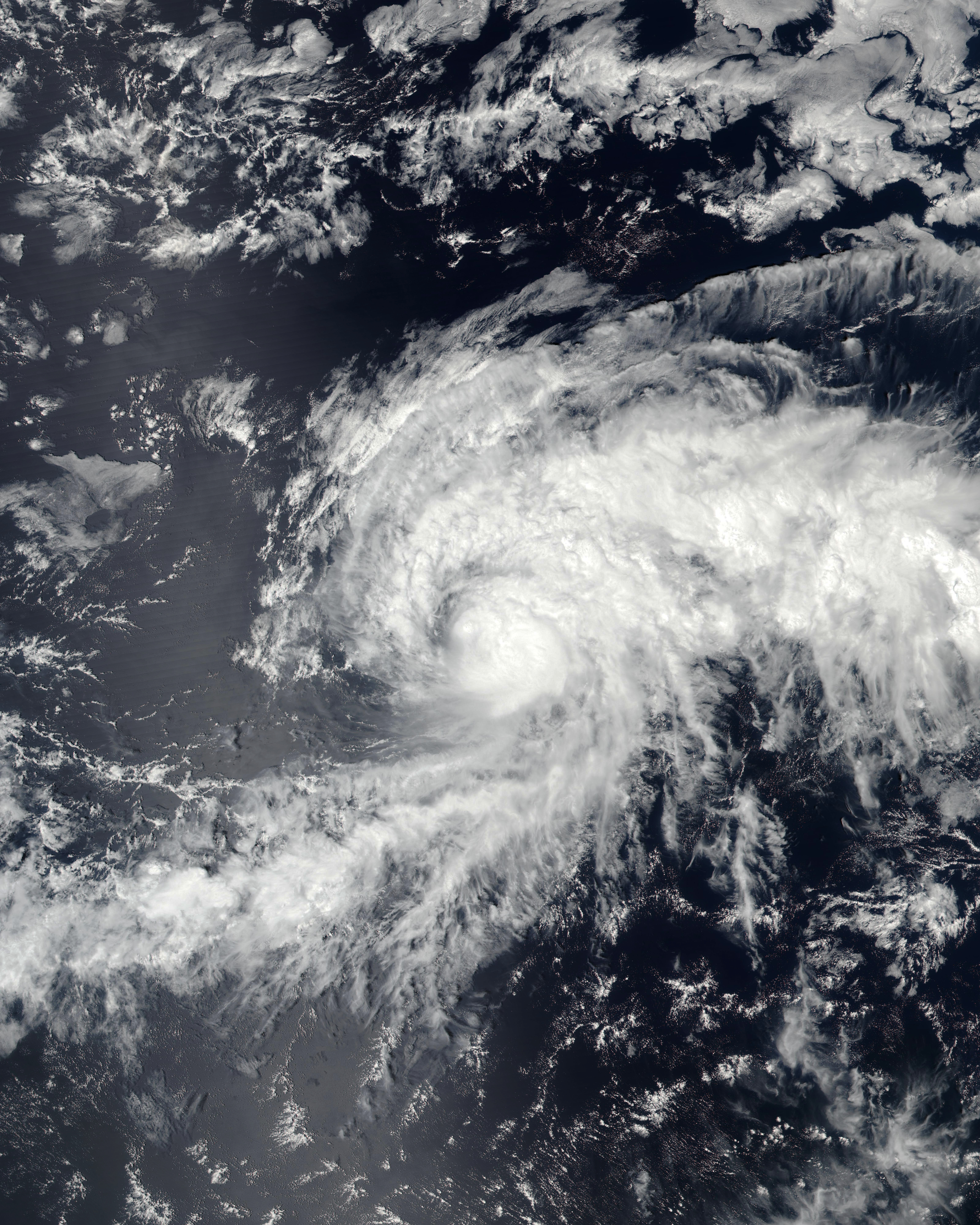
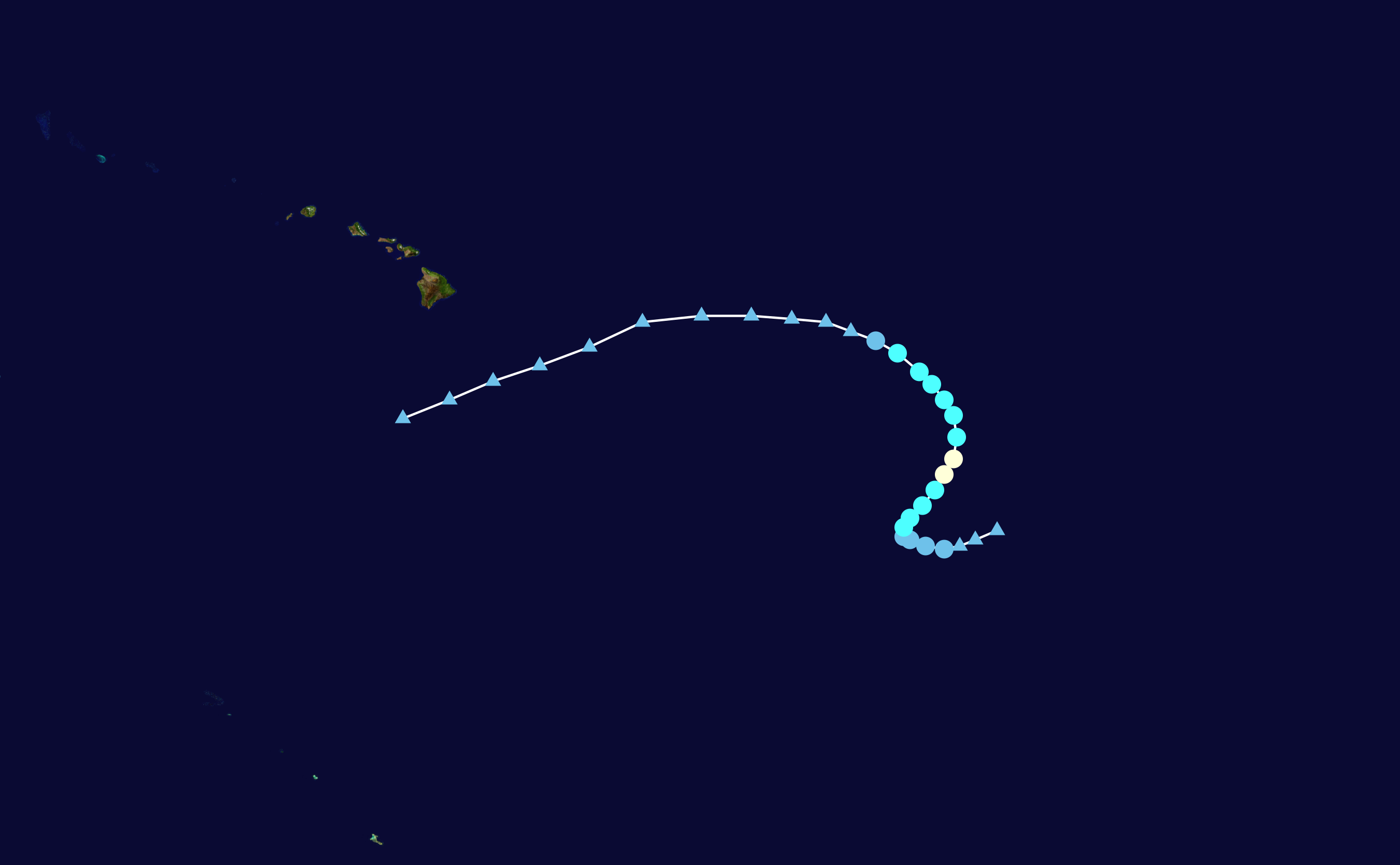
- Duration: September 26 – September 30
- Peak intensity: 75 mph (120 km/h) (1-min); 992 mbar (hPa)

On September 26, the NHC upgraded a long-tracked tropical wave into Tropical Depression Nineteen-E. Within hours of formation, the depression moved into the Central Pacific and was upgraded into Tropical Storm Ulika. With an upper-level low to the northwest, Ulika slowly turned north, then northeast, back into the Eastern Pacific by 18:00 UTC the following day, Situated in a favorable environment, Ulika steadily intensified, reaching Category 1 strength at 2:00 a.m. PDT (09:00 UTC) on September 28, and simultaneously reaching a peak intensity of 75 mph (120 km/h). Later that day, Ulika began weakening due to an increase in southwesterly wind shear. The low began to steer Ulika northwards, then northwestwards into September 29. While crossing back into the Central Pacific (for a record-tying third time), Ulika weakened into a remnant low the following day. The remains of the storm continued a westwards movement, then southwestwards until dissipating on October 3.

=== Hurricane Seymour ===
- Category 4 hurricane (SSHWS)
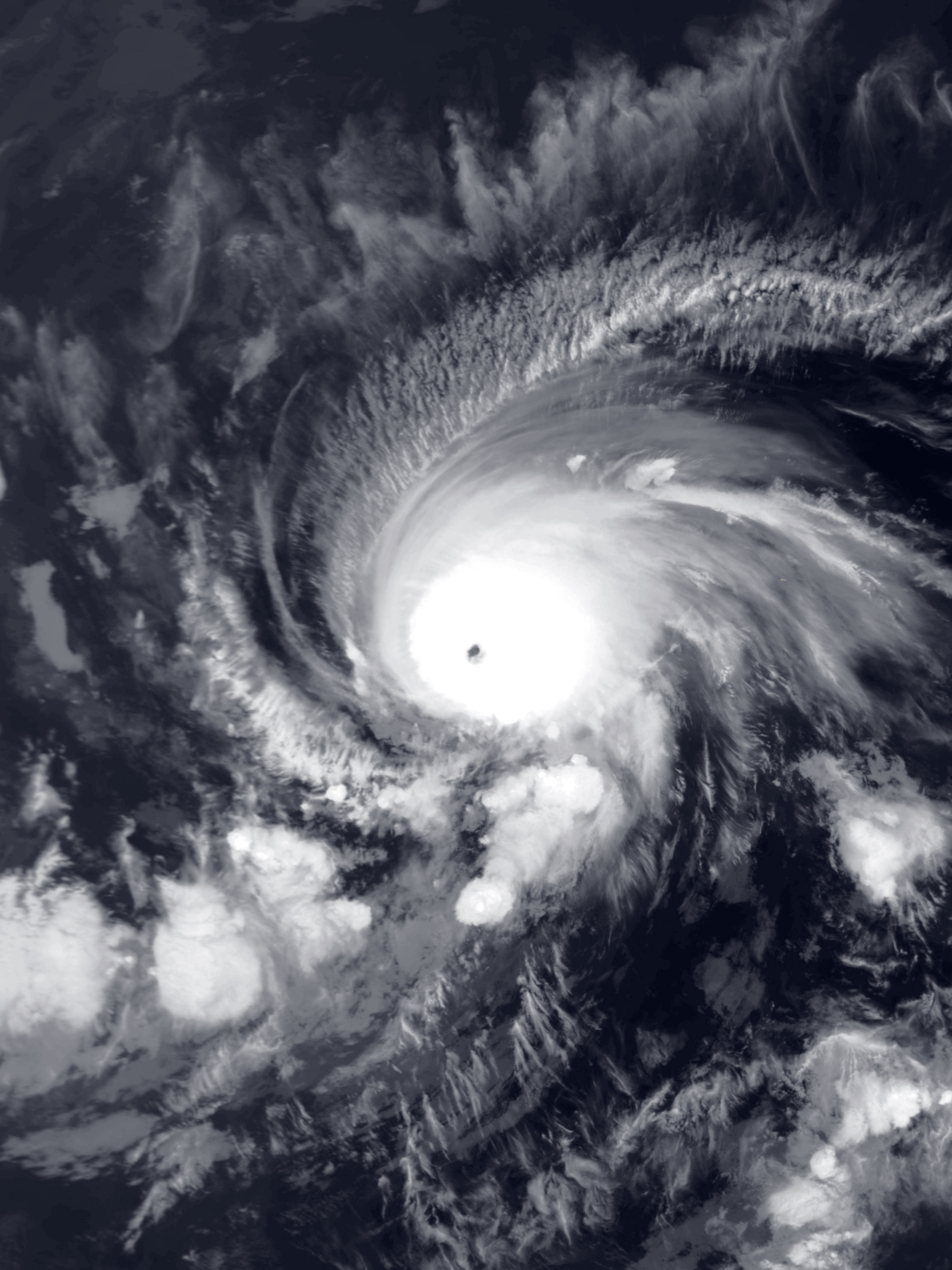
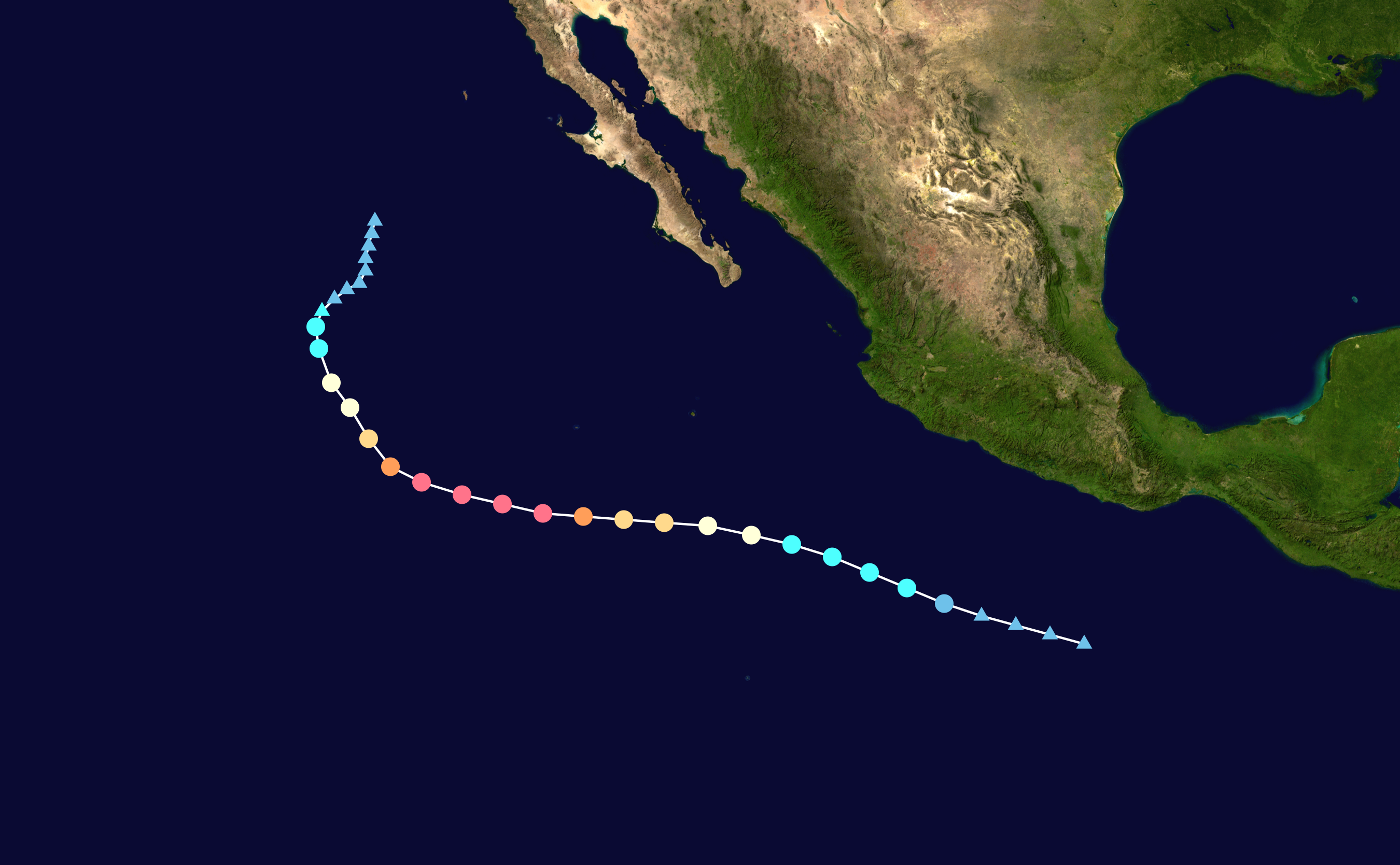
- Duration: October 23 – October 28
- Peak intensity: 150 mph (240 km/h) (1-min); 940 mbar (hPa)

On October 11, a fast-moving tropical wave moved off the coast of Africa, and traversed the Atlantic without development. By October 20, the disturbance emerged into the Pacific Ocean. The next day, a weak surface circulation developed in response to a Gulf of Tehuantepec wind gap event. Organization continued further over the next two days, and after deep convection became more concentrated and the low became better defined, it is estimated that Tropical Depression Twenty-E formed around 06:00 UTC on October 23 about 360 miles (580 km) south of Manzanillo, Mexico, later strengthening into a tropical storm six hours later and assigned the name Seymour, accordingly.

Moving westward, Seymour began developing banding features and an eye was becoming evident on satellite. The hurricane later entered a period of rapid intensification due to very favorable conditions, which included low wind shear, a moist atmosphere, and sea surface temperatures (SSTs) of around 29–30 °C (84–86 °F). The eye of Seymour later contracted to around 10 miles (16 km). By late on October 25, Seymour reached its peak intensity as a high-end category 4 major hurricane with sustained winds of 150 mph (240 km/h) and a pressure of 940 millibars (28 inHg). Shortly after peaking in intensity, the cyclone rapidly weakened in response to increasing wind shear, drier air and decreasing sea surface temperatures due to upwelling as it turned northwestwards around the edge of a subtropical ridge. By 18:00 UTC on October 27, Seymour had weakened to a tropical storm, shortly before degenerating into a remnant low early the next day. The low continued to drift northwards before dissipating on October 30 about 500 miles (800 km) west of Puerto Cortes, Baja California Sur, Mexico.

=== Tropical Storm Tina ===
- Tropical storm (SSHWS)
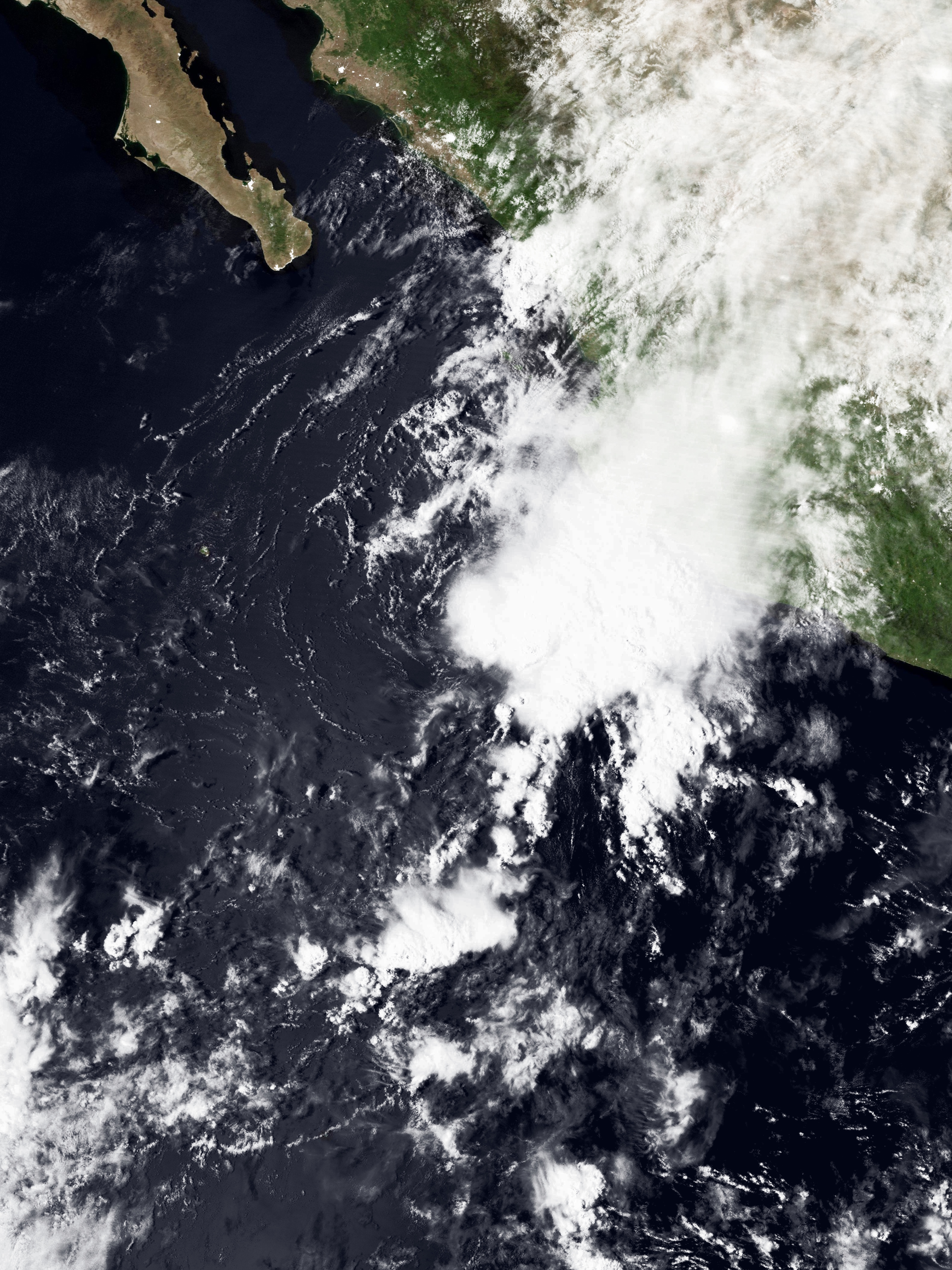
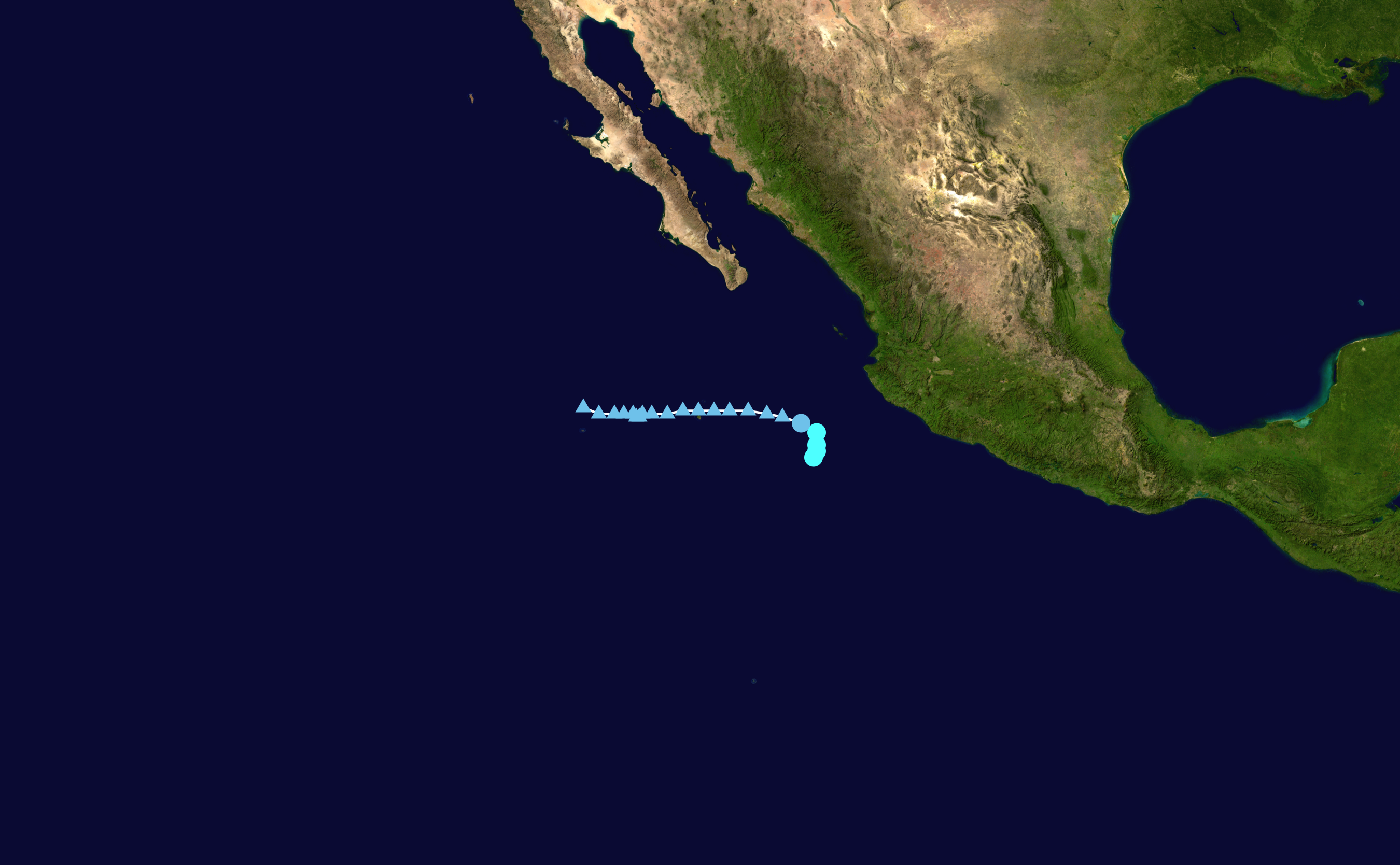
- Duration: November 13 – November 14
- Peak intensity: 40 mph (65 km/h) (1-min); 1004 mbar (hPa)

A tropical disturbance broke off from a low- to mid-level trough over the northern Caribbean on November 2, moving southwestwards into the Eastern Pacific by November 8. That same day, a low-pressure area formed within the disturbance. Persistent deep convection significantly increased over the next few days, attributed to the passage of a convectively coupled Kelvin wave. Turning northwards due to a mid-level high, convection continued to increase despite increasing southwesterly wind shear. By November 12, a low-level circulation center formed within the much broader, though disorganized, system. Eventually, the circulation became sufficiently well-defined to be declared Tropical Storm Tina at 06:00 UTC on November 13. Due to the strong wind shear, however, Tina remained weak throughout the day, with winds never rising above 40 mph (65 km/h). As the low- and mid-level circulations began to decouple, Tina turned westwards the next day as it weakened to a tropical depression. Amid strong shear and a dry atmospheric environment, convection could not be sustained and Tina degenerated to a remnant low just 30 hours after its formation. The remnant low continued drifting westwards for the next four days, before dissipating completely on November 18.

=== Tropical Storm Otto ===
- Tropical storm (SSHWS)
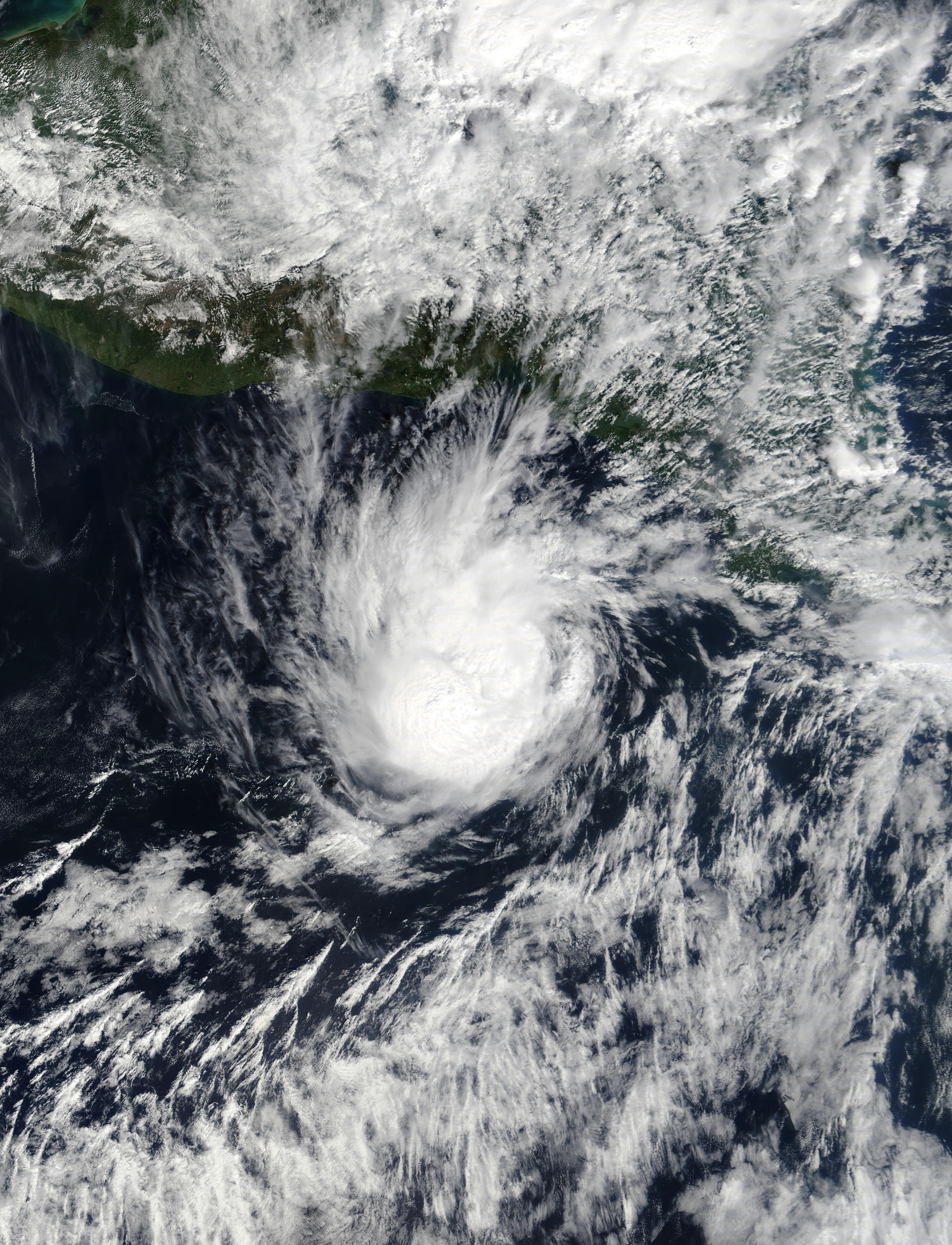
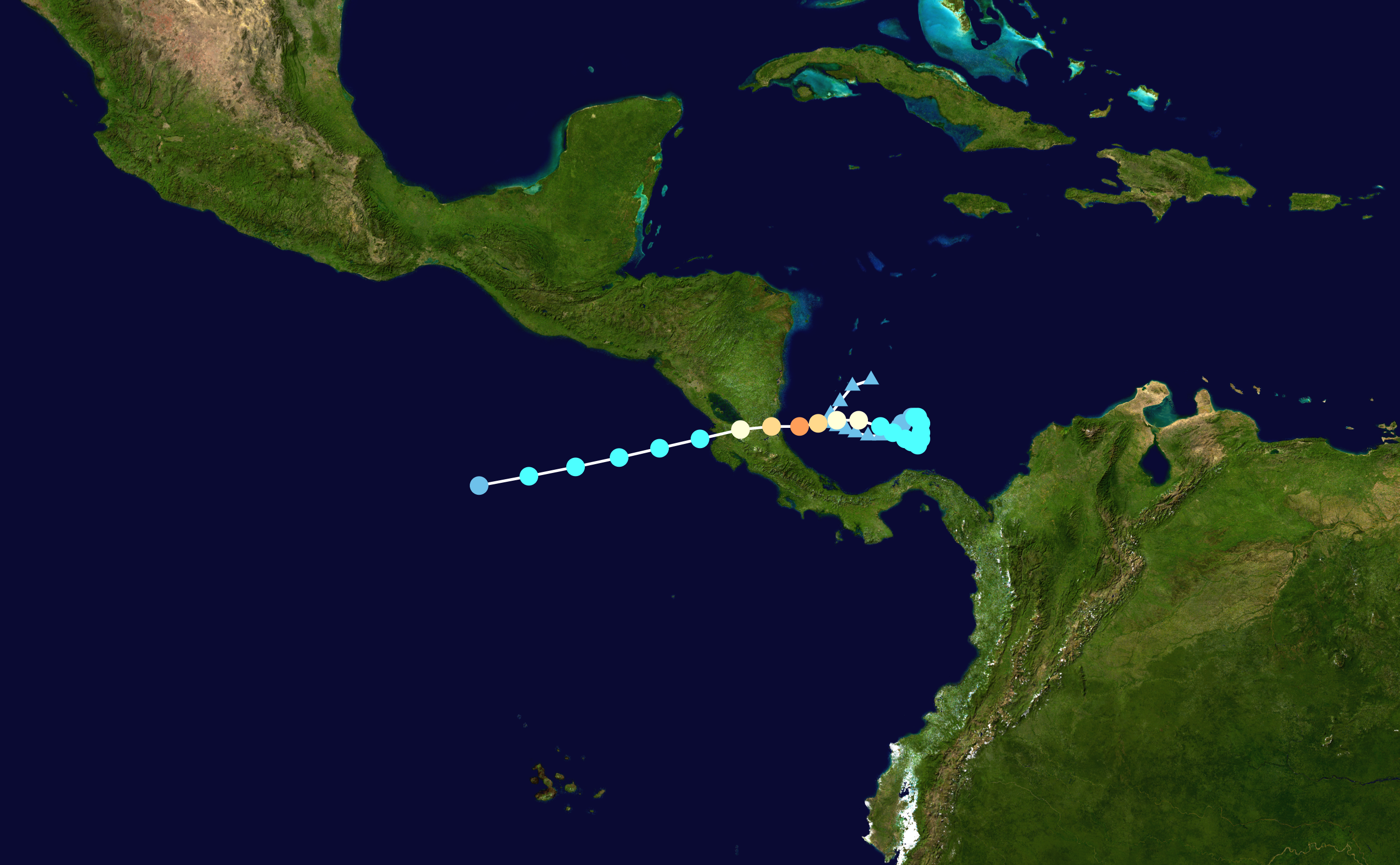
- Duration: November 25 (Entered basin) – November 26
- Peak intensity: 70 mph (110 km/h) (1-min); 993 mbar (hPa)

Early on November 25, the center of once-hurricane Otto from the Atlantic basin emerged into the Eastern Pacific, becoming the first to do so since Hurricane Cesar–Douglas in 1996. Due to crossing over the mountainous terrain of Nicaragua and Costa Rica, Otto weakened somewhat as it moved westwards, with possible indications of its circulation being tilted. Continuing to move westwards due to the influence of a subtropical ridge to its north, Otto eventually encountered more hostile environmental conditions, as wind shear began to increase dramatically. The circulation of Otto became disrupted, and Otto opened up into a trough of low pressure on November 26.

=== Other systems ===
On August 11, the Japan Meteorological Agency (JMA) reported that a tropical depression had developed near the International Date Line about 2,000 km (1,245 mi) to the northwest of Honolulu, Hawaii. Over the next day, the system moved northwestwards and was last noted before it moved into the Western Pacific basin. On September 12, the JMA had reported that another tropical depression had developed east of the International Date Line, while the CPHC assessed it as having a low chance of formation in the next 48 hours. However, the system dissipated soon after amid unfavorable conditions. On October 3, according to its best track, the JMA started tracking a tropical depression to the east of the International Date Line. The system moved into the West Pacific, where it eventually became Typhoon Songda. On October 15, the JMA started to track a tropical depression just east of the International Date Line, however, the tropical depression moved into the Western Pacific basin six hours later.

== Storm names ==
The following list of names was used for named storms that formed in the North Pacific Ocean east of 140°W during 2016. This was the same list used in the 2010 season, except for the name Ivette, which replaced Isis, after further use of the latter was deemed inappropriate by the World Meteorological Organization (WMO) in 2015, as it had become associated with the Islamic extremist militant group, also known as ISIS. The name Ivette was used for the first time in 2016. No names were retired from the 2016 season, so the same list used again for the 2022 season.

- Agatha
- Blas
- Celia *
- Darby *
- Estelle
- Frank
- Georgette
- Howard
- Ivette *
- Javier
- Kay
- Lester *
- Madeline *
- Newton
- Orlene
- Paine
- Roslyn
- Seymour
- Tina
- Virgil (unused)
- Winifred (unused)
- Xavier (unused)
- Yolanda (unused)
- Zeke (unused)

- Additionally, Otto entered the northeastern Pacific basin during the season from the Atlantic basin after crossing Central America as a tropical cyclone. As the system crossed between basins intact, it retained its Atlantic-list name.

For storms that form in the North Pacific from 140°W to the International Date Line, the names come from a series of four rotating lists. Names are used one after the other without regard to year, and when the bottom of one list is reached, the next named storm receives the name at the top of the next list. Two named storms, listed below, formed within the area in 2016. Also, named storms in the table above that crossed into the area during the season are noted (*).

- Pali
- Ulika

== Season effects ==
This is a table of all of the storms that formed in the 2016 Pacific hurricane season. It includes their name, duration, peak classification and intensities, areas affected, damage, and death totals (within the basin). Deaths in parentheses are additional and indirect (an example of an indirect death would be a traffic accident), but were still related to that storm. Damage and deaths include totals while the storm was extratropical, a wave, or a low, and all of the damage figures are in 2016 USD.

Saffir–Simpson scale
TD	TS	C1	C2	C3	C4	C5

2016 Pacific hurricane season statistics
Storm name	Dates active	Storm category at peak intensity	Max 1-min wind mph (km/h)	Min. press. (mbar)	Areas affected	Damage (US$)	Deaths	Ref(s).
Pali	January 7–14	Category 2 hurricane	100 (155)	978	Kiribati	Unknown	4	
One-E	June 6–8	Tropical depression	35 (55)	1006	Southwestern Mexico	Minimal	None	
Agatha	July 2–5	Tropical storm	50 (85)	1002	None	None	None	
Blas	July 2–10	Category 4 hurricane	140 (220)	947	Hawaii	None	None	
Celia	July 6–16	Category 2 hurricane	100 (155)	972	Hawaii	Minimal	2	
Darby	July 11–26	Category 3 hurricane	120 (195)	958	Hawaii	Minimal	None	
Estelle	July 15–22	Tropical storm	70 (110)	990	None	None	None	
Frank	July 21–28	Category 1 hurricane	85 (140)	979	Baja California Peninsula, Nayarit	Unknown	None	
Georgette	July 21–27	Category 4 hurricane	130 (215)	952	Hawaii	None	None	
Howard	July 31 – August 3	Tropical storm	60 (95)	998	Hawaii	None	None	
Ivette	August 2–8	Tropical storm	60 (95)	1000	None	None	None	
Javier	August 7–9	Tropical storm	65 (100)	997	Western Mexico, Northwestern Mexico, Baja California Peninsula	Minimal	None	
Kay	August 18–23	Tropical storm	50 (85)	1000	None	None	None	
Lester	August 24 – September 7	Category 4 hurricane	145 (230)	944	Hawaii	Minimal	None	
Madeline	August 26 – September 2	Category 4 hurricane	130 (215)	950	Hawaii	Minimal	None	
Newton	September 4–7	Category 1 hurricane	90 (150)	977	Baja California Peninsula, Northwestern Mexico, Southwestern United States	$95.8 million	12	
Orlene	September 11–17	Category 2 hurricane	110 (175)	967	None	None	None	
Paine	September 18–21	Category 1 hurricane	90 (150)	979	Baja California Peninsula, Southwestern United States	Minimal	None	
Roslyn	September 25–29	Tropical storm	50 (85)	999	None	None	None	
Ulika	September 26–30	Category 1 hurricane	75 (120)	992	None	None	None	
Seymour	October 23–28	Category 4 hurricane	150 (240)	940	Baja California	None	None	
Tina	November 13–14	Tropical storm	40 (65)	1004	Western Mexico	None	None	
Otto	November 25–26	Tropical storm	70 (110)	993	None (after crossover)	None	None	
Season aggregates
23 systems	January 7 – November 26		150 (240)	940		$95.8 million	18	

== See also ==
- Weather of 2016
- Tropical cyclones in 2016
- List of Pacific hurricanes
- Pacific hurricane season
- 2016 Atlantic hurricane season
- 2016 Pacific typhoon season
- 2016 North Indian Ocean cyclone season
- South-West Indian Ocean cyclone seasons: 2015–16, 2016–17
- Australian region cyclone seasons: 2015–16, 2016–17
- South Pacific cyclone seasons: 2015–16, 2016–17
- South Atlantic tropical cyclone
