= Cyclone Vardah =

North Indian cyclone in 2016

Very Severe Cyclonic Storm Vardah
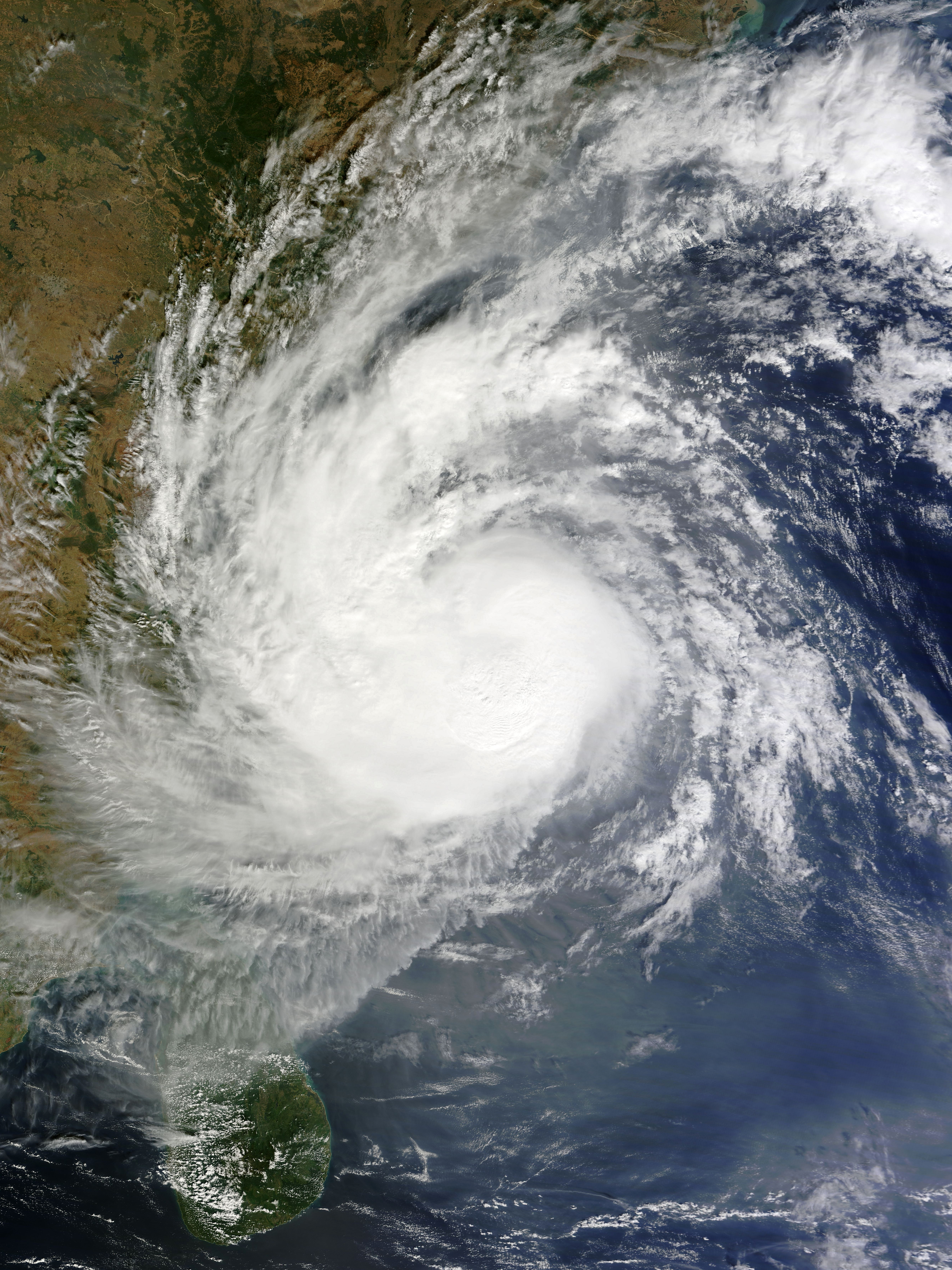
- Vardah near peak intensity on 11 December

Meteorological history
- Formed: 6 December 2016
- Dissipated: 13 December 2016 (19 December 2016 per JTWC)

Very severe cyclonic storm
- 3-minute sustained (IMD)
- Highest winds: 130 km/h (80 mph)
- Lowest pressure: 975 hPa (mbar); 28.79 inHg

Category 2-equivalent tropical cyclone
- 1-minute sustained (SSHWS/JTWC)
- Highest winds: 155 km/h (100 mph)
- Lowest pressure: 959 hPa (mbar); 28.32 inHg

Overall effects
- Fatalities: 47 total
- Damage: $3.38 billion (2016 USD)
- Areas affected: Thailand, Sumatra, Malaysia, Andaman and Nicobar Islands, Sri Lanka, South India
- IBTrACS
- Part of the 2016 North Indian Ocean cyclone season

Very Severe Cyclonic Storm Vardah (Note: The name Vardah (Urdu: وردہ, [ʋərdɑː]) was contributed by Pakistan and means "rose" in Urdu.) was the fourth cyclonic storm, as well as the most intense tropical cyclone of the 2016 North Indian Ocean cyclone season. The system struck the Andaman and Nicobar Islands and South India before its remnants later led to the formation of Depression ARB 02 in the Arabian Sea.

Originating as a low-pressure area near the Malay Peninsula on 3 December, the storm was designated a depression on 6 December. It gradually intensified into a Deep Depression on the following day, skirting off the Andaman and Nicobar Islands, and intensified into a Cyclonic Storm on 8 December. Maintaining a generally westward track thereafter, Vardah consolidated into a Severe Cyclonic Storm on 9 December, before peaking as a Very Severe Cyclonic Storm, with 3-minute sustained winds of 80 mph (130 km/h), and a minimum central pressure of 975 hPa (28.8 inHg), on 11 December. Weakening into a Severe Cyclonic Storm, Vardah made landfall close to Chennai on the following day, and degenerated into remnant low on 13 December. The next day, its remnants emerged in the Arabian Sea, where it eventually led to the formation of Depression ARB 02 on 17 December, a separate system according to the India Meteorological Department (IMD), that lasted until early 18 December.

== Meteorological history ==
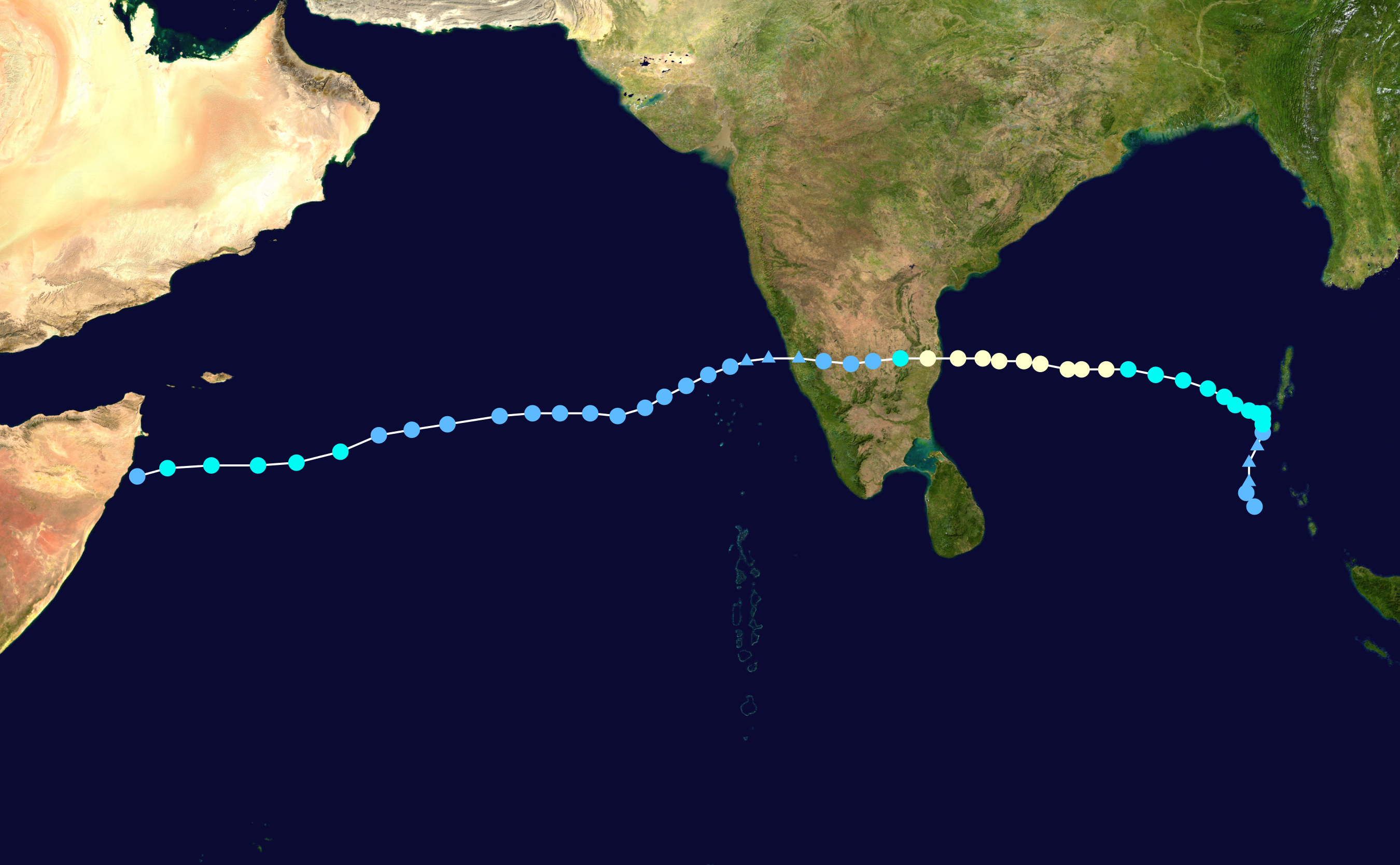
Map plotting the storm's track and intensity, according to the Saffir–Simpson scale Map key Saffir–Simpson scale Tropical depression (≤38 mph, ≤62 km/h) Tropical storm (39–73 mph, 63–118 km/h) Category 1 (74–95 mph, 119–153 km/h) Category 2 (96–110 mph, 154–177 km/h) Category 3 (111–129 mph, 178–208 km/h) Category 4 (130–156 mph, 209–251 km/h) Category 5 (≥157 mph, ≥252 km/h) Unknown Storm type Tropical cyclone Subtropical cyclone Extratropical cyclone, remnant low, tropical disturbance, or monsoon depression

Under the influence of a persistent area of convection, a low-pressure area formed over the Malay Peninsula, adjoining north Sumatra, in early December 2016. The low-pressure area gradually organized into a tropical disturbance over the next several days, as it slowly moved towards the southeast Bay of Bengal. On 6 December, The IMD classified the system as Depression BOB 06, as the system had sufficiently organized itself, with winds of 45 km/h (30 mph). Owing to low wind shear and favorable sea surface temperatures, the storm gradually intensified into a Deep Depression on the following day. Skirting off the Andaman and Nicobar Islands as a Deep Depression, BOB 06 was upgraded to a Cyclonic Storm by the IMD and JTWC, in the early hours of 8 December, and was assigned the name Vardah.

With conditions favorable for further development, Vardah intensified into a Severe Cyclonic Storm on 9 December. Although predicted to maintain its intensity, Vardah strengthened further, as it followed a generally west-northwestwards track, prompting the IMD to upgrade its intensity to Very Severe Cyclonic Storm status, on 10 December. Gradually intensifying as it moved westward, Vardah reached its peak intensity on 11 December, with maximum 3-minute sustained winds of 130 km/h (80 mph), and a minimum central pressure of 975 mbar (28.79 inHg).

On 12 December, Vardah weakened into a Severe Cyclonic Storm, before making landfall over the eastern coast of India, close to Chennai, Tamil Nadu, with winds of 65 mph (105 km/h). Afterward, it rapidly weakened into a depression, due to land interaction, on 13 December. The depression caused overnight rainfall in Southern Karnataka on 13 December. Due to land interaction, Vardah degenerated into a well-marked low on 13 December, at around midday, local time. The remnants of Vardah crossed the Indian Subcontinent and entered the Arabian Sea on 14 December. Owing to warm sea surface temperatures, the system regenerated into a depression on 17 December, which the JTWC considered as a continuation of Vardah, while IMD considered to be a separate system, assigning the storm a new identifier, ARB 02, according to their protocol, and keeping separate entries for each on their own database and best track. The new system was tracked by the IMD until early 18 December, when it weakened into a well-marked low-pressure area, while the JTWC tracked it until 19 December, located just off the coast of Somalia.

== Preparations and impact ==
=== Thailand ===
The precursor low of Cyclone Vardah caused severe flooding in Thailand, affecting half a million residents in the country's southern provinces. By the end of the week, more than 300 millimetres (12 in) of rainfall was observed in Nakhon Si Thammarat Province of the country. 21 people were reported to be killed due to the floods, and the damage were about US$25 million.

=== South India ===
==== Andaman and Nicobar Islands ====
Vardah brought heavy rainfall to Andaman and Nicobar Islands as a Deep Depression. Hut Bay recorded 166 mm (6.5 in) of rainfall on 6 December, while Port Blair recorded 167 mm (6.6 in) of rainfall on 7 December. More than 1,400 tourists were stranded on the Havelock and Neil islands of the archipelago, during the storm. They were evacuated by the Indian Navy on 9 December.

==== Tamil Nadu ====
Vardah making landfall over the coast of India

More than 12,26,000 people were evacuated from low-lying areas, as a result of Vardah. The Indian Armed Forces were kept on standby for any relief operations. Two warships, INS Shivalik and INS Kadmatt, sailed out of Visakhapatnam to Chennai, carrying medical teams, divers, inflatable rubber boats, an integral helicopter, and material, including food, tents, clothes, medicines, and blankets to aid with relief efforts. Fifteen teams of the National Disaster Response Force were deployed in various coastal regions. The cyclone killed 24 people in the state, and caused ₹22,573 crore (US$3.35 billion) in damage.

Vardah crossed the eastern coast of India close to Chennai in the afternoon hours of 12 December 2016. Winds were estimated at 65 mph (105 km/h) during landfall. The cyclone claimed over 18 lives, uprooted about 15 lakh trees in Chennai and its suburbs, and caused extensive damage to roads, supplies, and power infrastructure: over 1,00,000 electric poles were mangled and 8,000 transformers were damaged. Carcasses of around 550 cows were found afloat in a lake in the Kancheepuram District. As many as 2,424 roads were blocked, and 240 huts were also damaged. More than ten people were reported to have been killed, due to events related to the storm.

Personnel of the National Disaster Response Force (NDRF) removing trees blocking roads in Chennai after Vardah's impact, on 13 December 2016

Public transportation was severely affected by Vardah. Chennai International Airport was closed at least until 11:00 pm IST (5:30 pm UTC) on 12 December, in the wake of the storm, leaving about 5,000 passengers stranded. The Indian Railways suspended operations of all 170 outstation trains originating from Chennai, and suburban railway services were also canceled. Chennai Metro services were also affected, after power was cut off, as a precaution by the EB.

Several Compound walls of buildings, the glass windows of scrapers, and certain buildings were damaged. If not, the walls became weak.

==== Andhra Pradesh ====
Two people were killed in the state. And the cyclone brought heavy rainfall over Rayalaseema region and adjoining Nellore and Prakasam districts. The flooding were also minor with little damages to agricultural crops and livelihood.

== See also ==
- Cyclone Jal
- Cyclone Mora
- Cyclone Thane
- Tropical depressions Wilma and BOB 05
