= 2016 North Indian Ocean cyclone season =

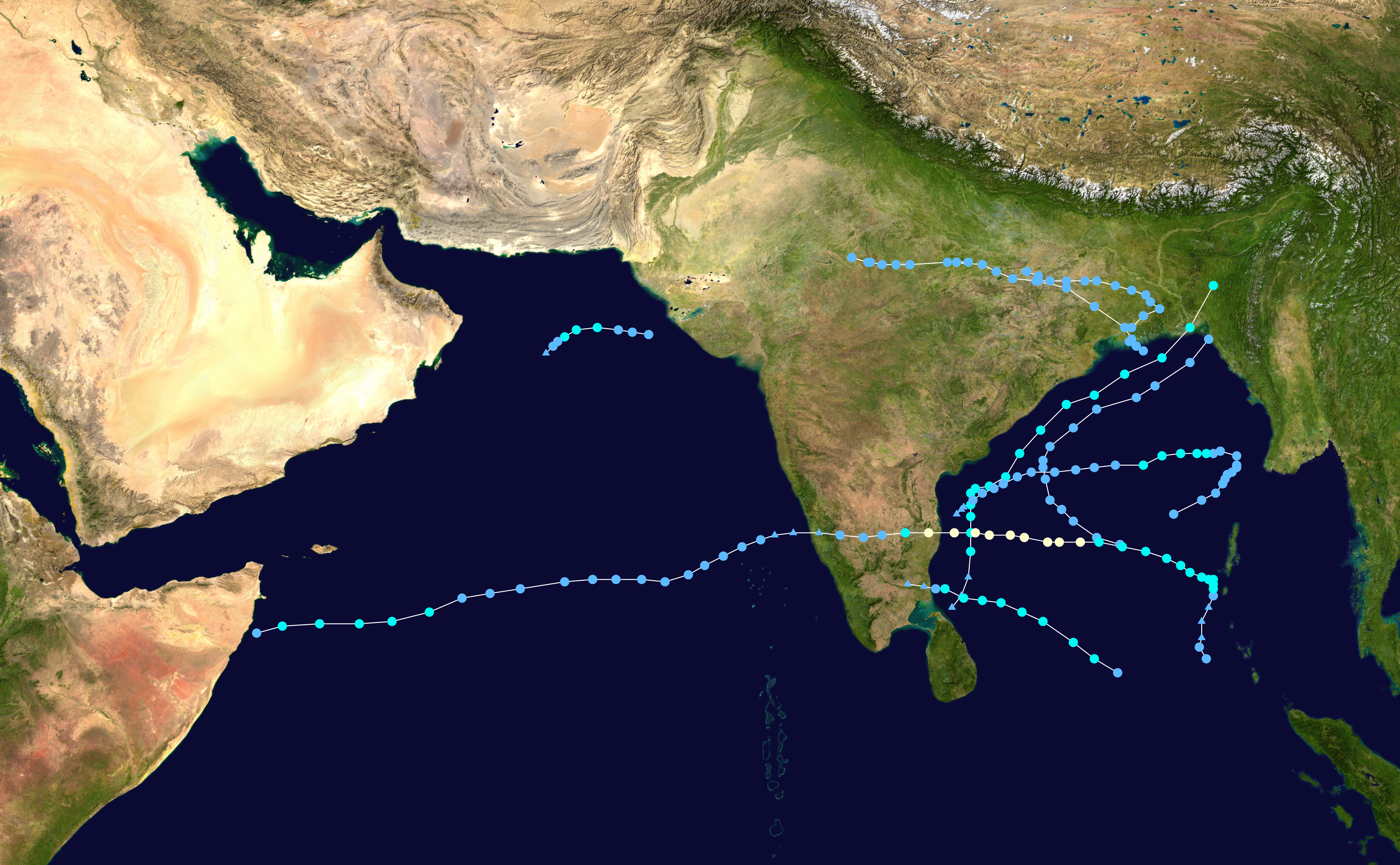
- Season summary map

Seasonal boundaries
- First system formed: 17 May 2016
- Last system dissipated: 18 December 2016

Strongest storm
- Name: Vardah
  - Maximum winds: 130 km/h (80 mph) (3-minute sustained)
  - Lowest pressure: 975 hPa (mbar)

Seasonal statistics
- Depressions: 10
- Deep depressions: 5
- Cyclonic storms: 4
- Severe cyclonic storms: 1
- Very severe cyclonic storms: 1
- Super cyclonic storms: 0
- Total fatalities: 401 total
- Total damage: $5.4 billion (2016 USD)

Related articles
- 2016 Atlantic hurricane season; 2016 Pacific hurricane season; 2016 Pacific typhoon season

The 2016 North Indian Ocean cyclone season was an event in the annual cycle of tropical cyclone formation. It was the deadliest season since 2010, killing more than 400 people. The season was a below-average one, seeing four named storms, with one further intensifying into a very severe cyclonic storm. The first named storm, Roanu, developed on 19 May, while the season's last named storm, Vardah, dissipated on 13 December.. The North Indian Ocean cyclone season has no official bounds, but cyclones tend to form between April and December, with the two peaks in May and November. These dates conventionally delimit the period of each year when most tropical cyclones form in the northern Indian Ocean, although the cyclone season officially spans the entire calendar year.

The scope of this article is limited to the Indian Ocean in the Northern Hemisphere, east of the Horn of Africa and west of the Malay Peninsula. There are two main seas in the North Indian Ocean — the Arabian Sea to the west of the Indian subcontinent, abbreviated ARB by the India Meteorological Department (IMD); and the Bay of Bengal to the east, abbreviated BOB by the IMD. The systems that form over land are abbreviated as LAND. The official Regional Specialized Meteorological Centre in this basin is the IMD, while the Joint Typhoon Warning Center releases unofficial advisories. On average, three to four cyclonic storms form in this basin every season.

== Season summary ==
The season officially started with the formation of Cyclone Roanu over the Bay of Bengal on 17 May. The beginning of June witnessed no storms, although many low-pressure areas formed over Bay of Bengal, but none of them intensified into a depression, due to a very strong southwest monsoon. At the end of June, Depression ARB 01 formed, but weakened within two days. July witnessed no storms until a deep depression formed in August, under the influence of an upper air cyclonic circulation over Gangetic West Bengal. However, multiple low-pressure areas developed over the Bay of Bengal, with Cyclonic Storm Kyant forming in October and Cyclonic Storm Nada in November. Due to the presence of warm sea surface temperatures, Very Severe Cyclone Vardah formed in December.

== Systems ==
=== Cyclonic Storm Roanu ===
- Cyclonic storm (IMD)
- Tropical storm (SSHWS)
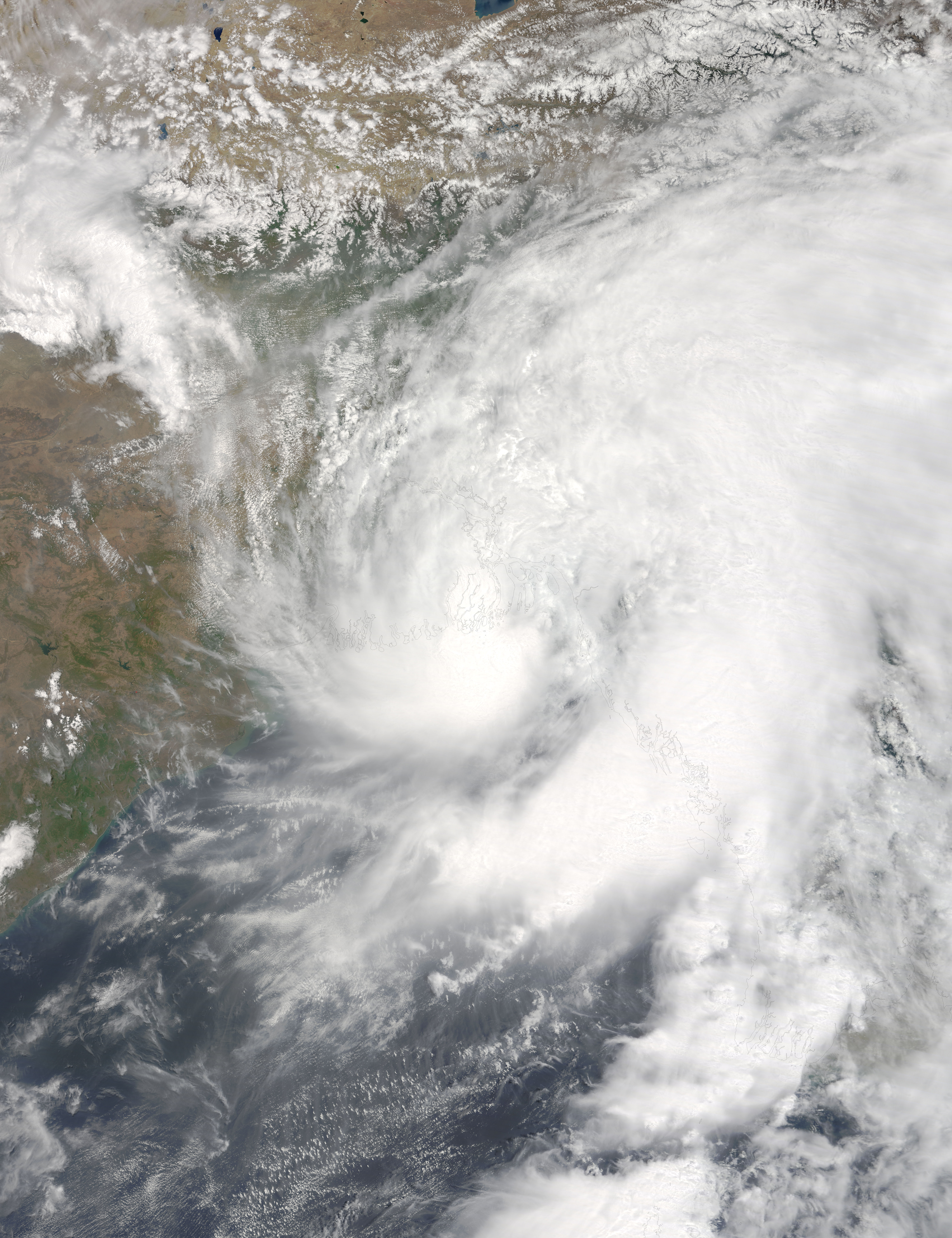
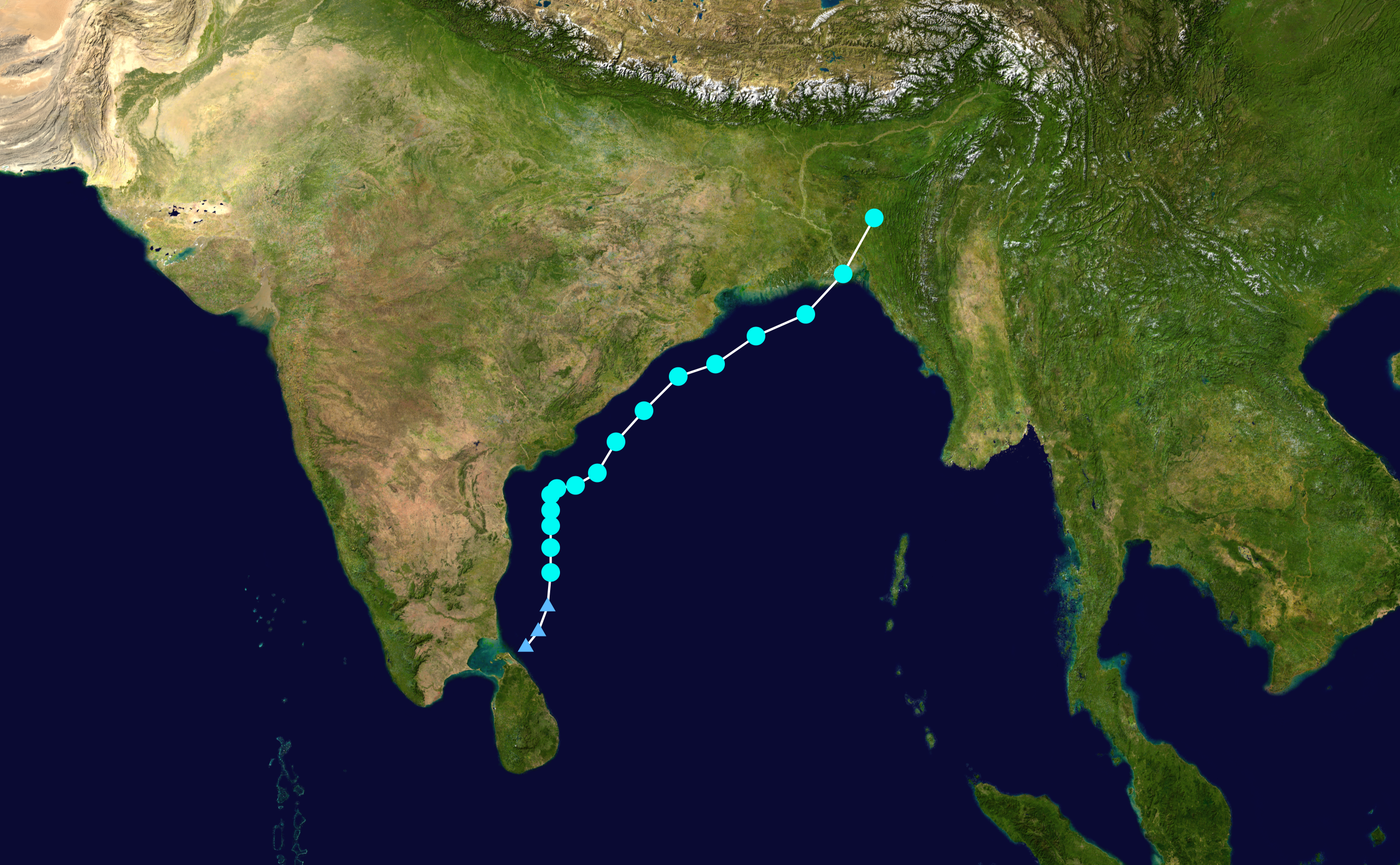
- Duration: 17 May – 22 May
- Peak intensity: 85 km/h (50 mph) (3-min); 983 hPa (mbar)

Under the influence of a trough, a low-pressure area formed over the Bay of Bengal on 14 May. It slowly consolidated, prompting the IMD to classify it as a depression on 17 May. By the late hours of 17 May, a Tropical Cyclone Formation Alert (TCFA) was issued, following which, the JTWC upgraded the system to tropical storm intensity. The next day, the IMD upgraded the storm to a deep depression, prompting the issuance of cyclone warnings for the states of Andhra Pradesh and Odisha. On 19 May, the IMD reported that the storm had reached cyclonic storm intensity, naming it Roanu. (Note: The name Roanu (Dhivehi: ރޯނު; [ɾoːnu]) was contributed by the Maldives and refers to coil ropes made out of coconut husks in Dhivehi.) The cyclone drifted in a northeastward track, and continued to intensify until persistent wind shear and its proximity to land eventually caused the storm to start weakening, on the same day. However, the wind shear soon decreased, and Roanu reintensified as deep convection became established over and around the low-level circulation center (LLCC). Moving generally east-northeastwards, the storm made landfall just northwest of Chittagong, Bangladesh on 21 May, upon which it rapidly weakened. The system dissipated over Gangetic West Bengal on 22 May. The outer rainbands of the storm caused heavy rain in south Bengal, including in Kolkata.

=== Depression ARB 01 ===
- Depression (IMD)
- Tropical storm (SSHWS)
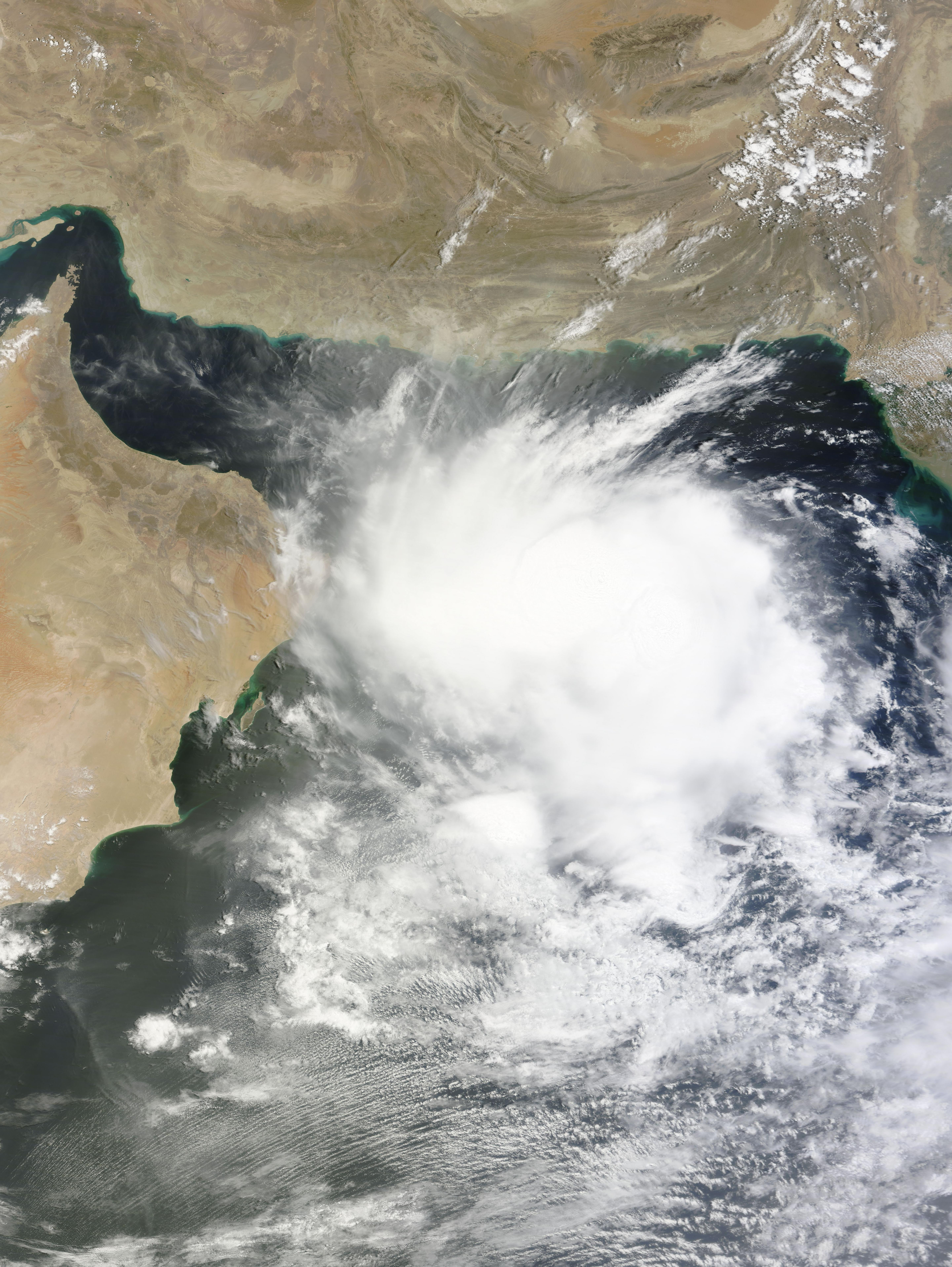
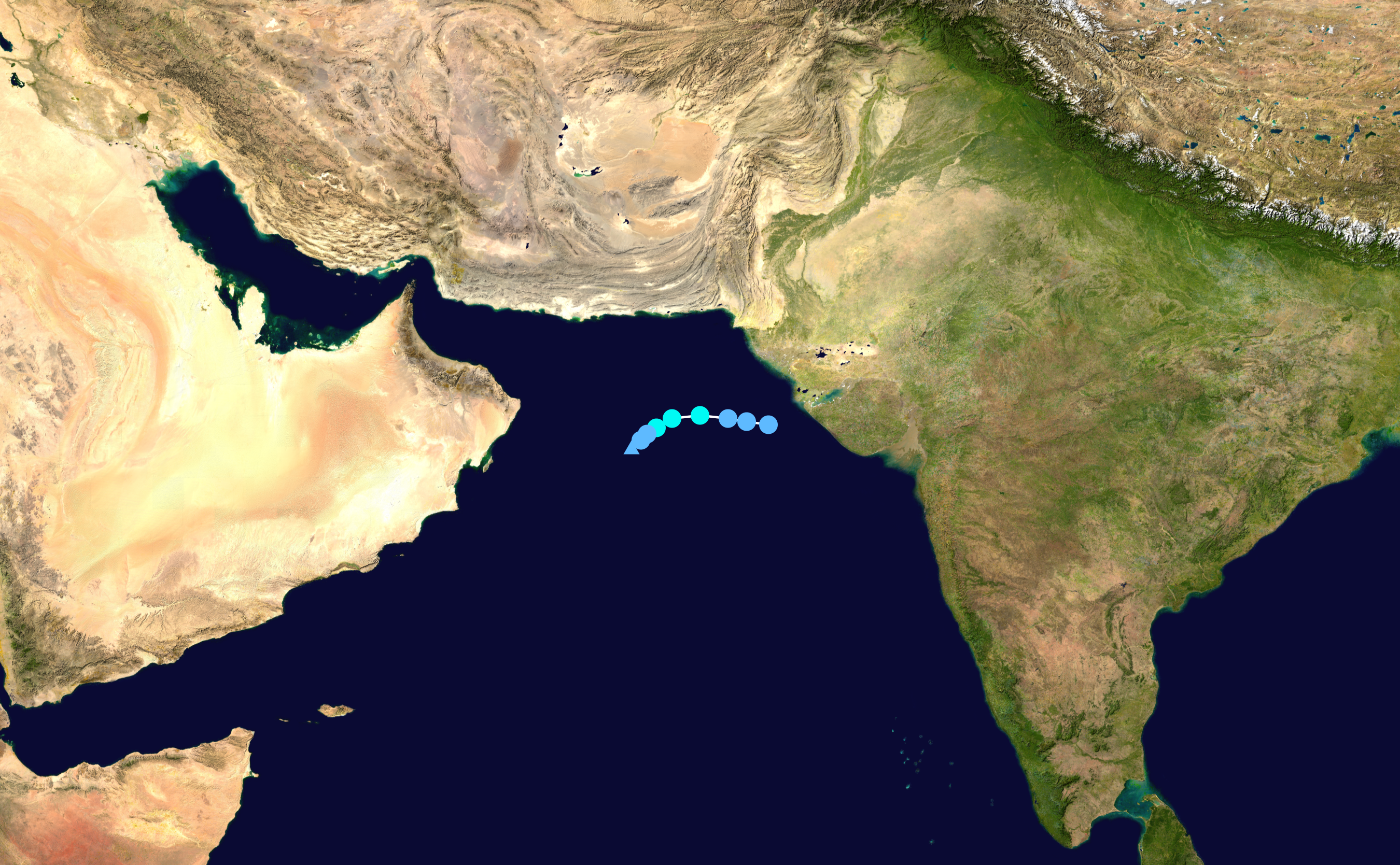
- Duration: 27 June – 29 June
- Peak intensity: 45 km/h (30 mph) (3-min); 996 hPa (mbar)

On 27 June, a low-pressure system organized into a depression in the Arabian Sea. It turned westward and moved into the cooler sections of the Arabian Sea and gradually weakened, before dissipating over open water on 29 June. The depression caused rainfall in Oman, particularly in the Ash Sharqiya and Al Wusta regions, even as it weakened. The impacts in Oman were mostly limited to the southern parts of the country.

=== Depression LAND 01 ===
- Depression (IMD)
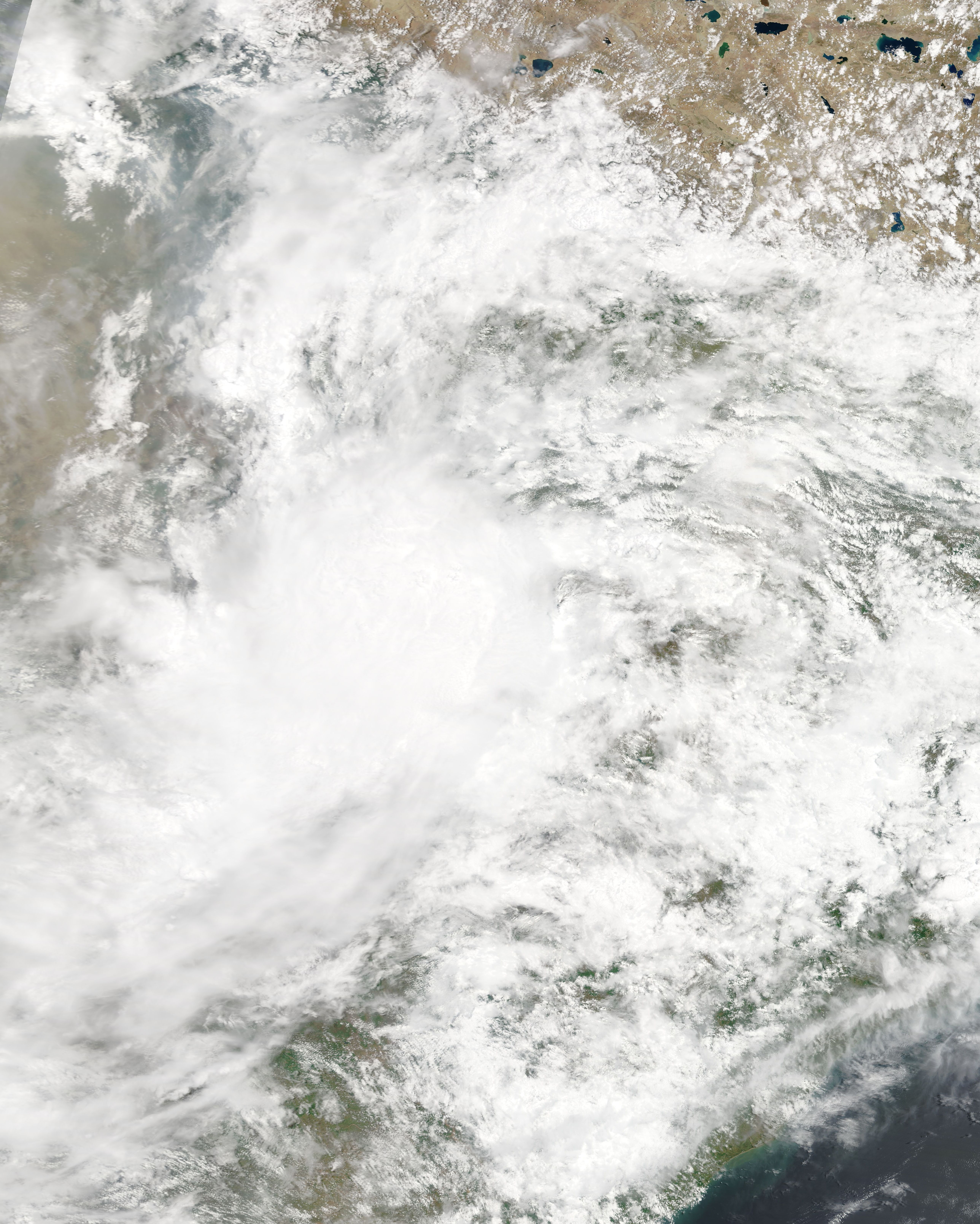
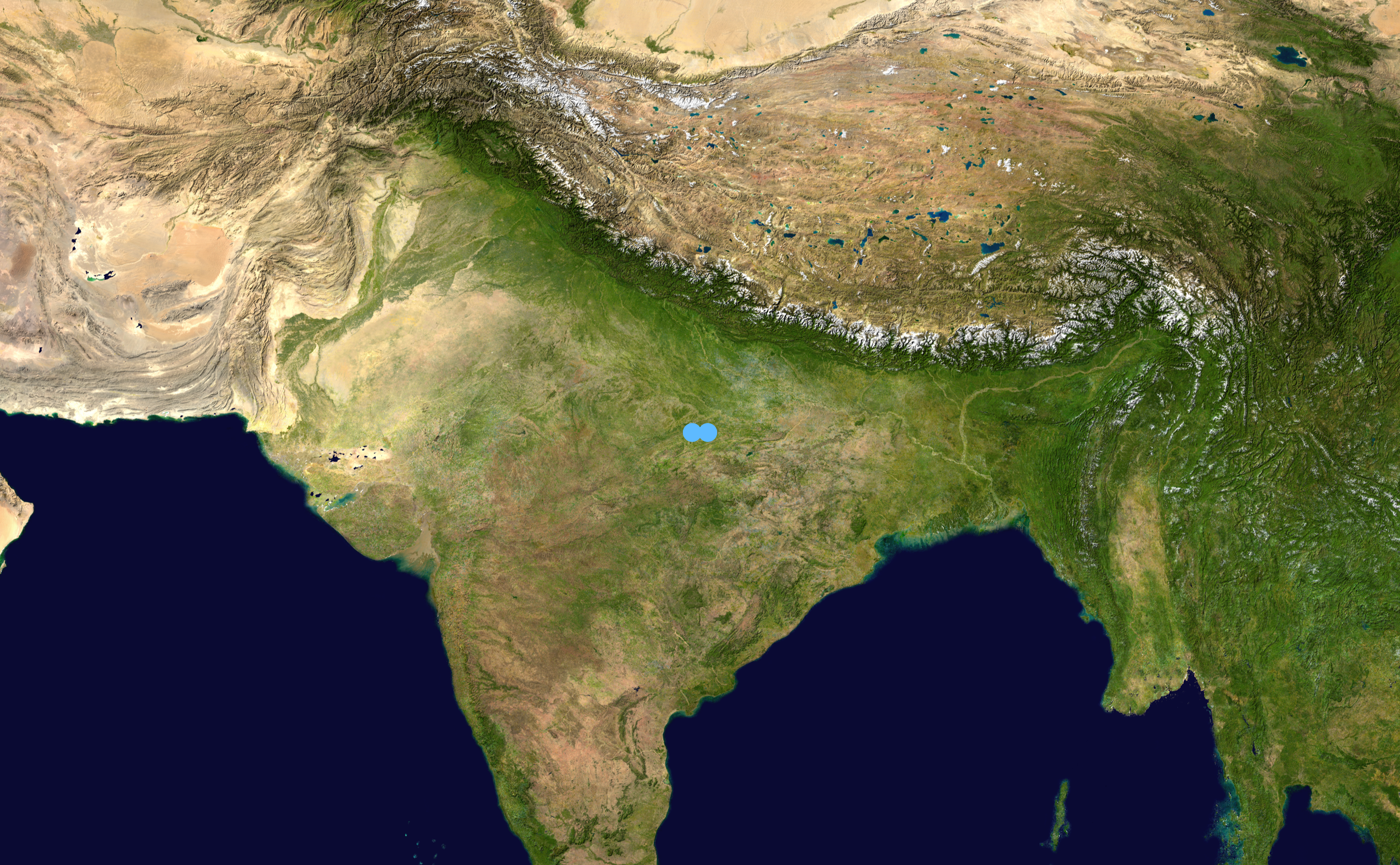
- Duration: 6 July – 7 July
- Peak intensity: 45 km/h (30 mph) (3-min); 996 hPa (mbar)

On 6 July, a depression formed over north central India. The Land Depression dissipated on the next day.

=== Deep Depression LAND 02 ===
- Deep depression (IMD)
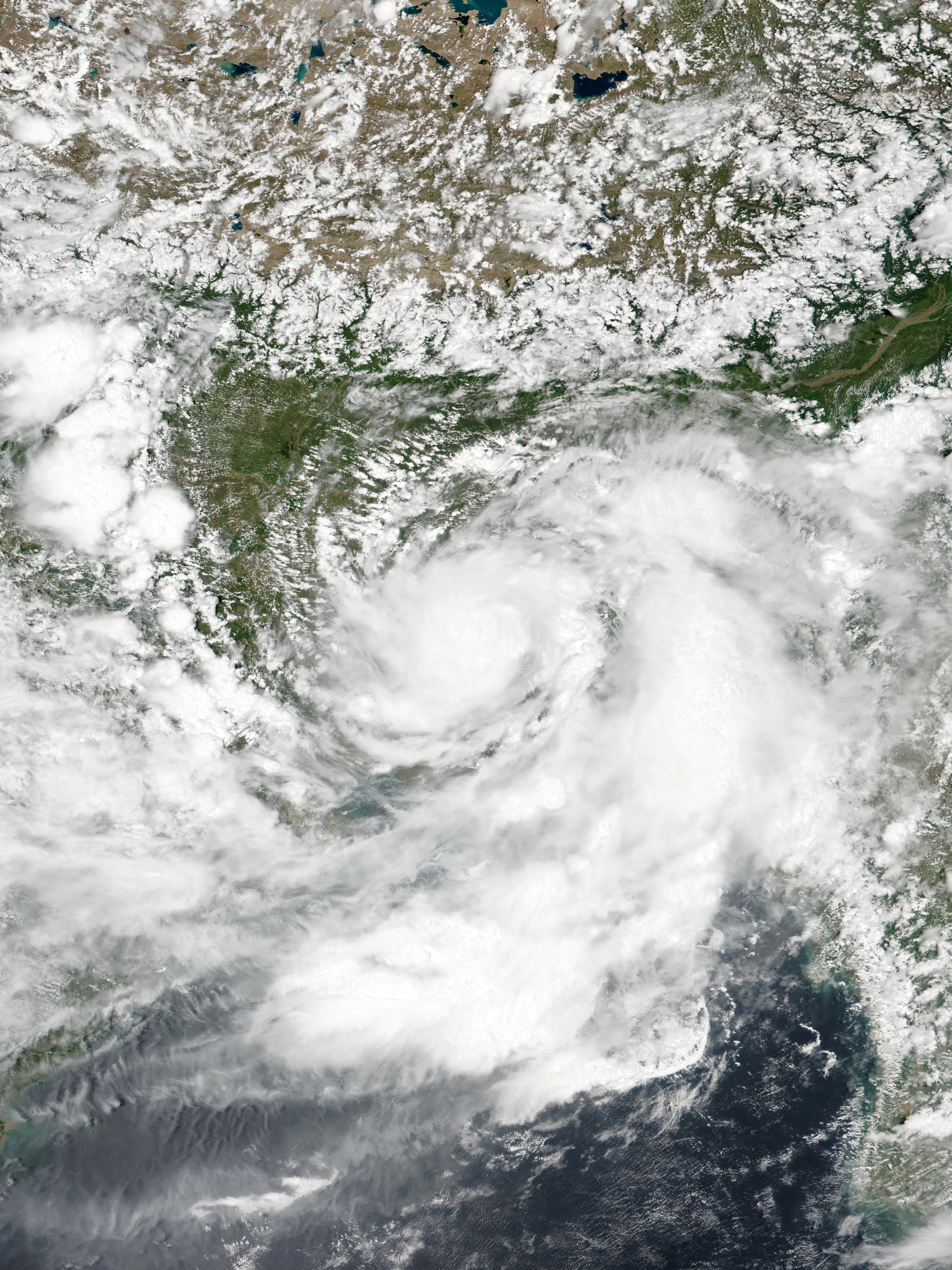
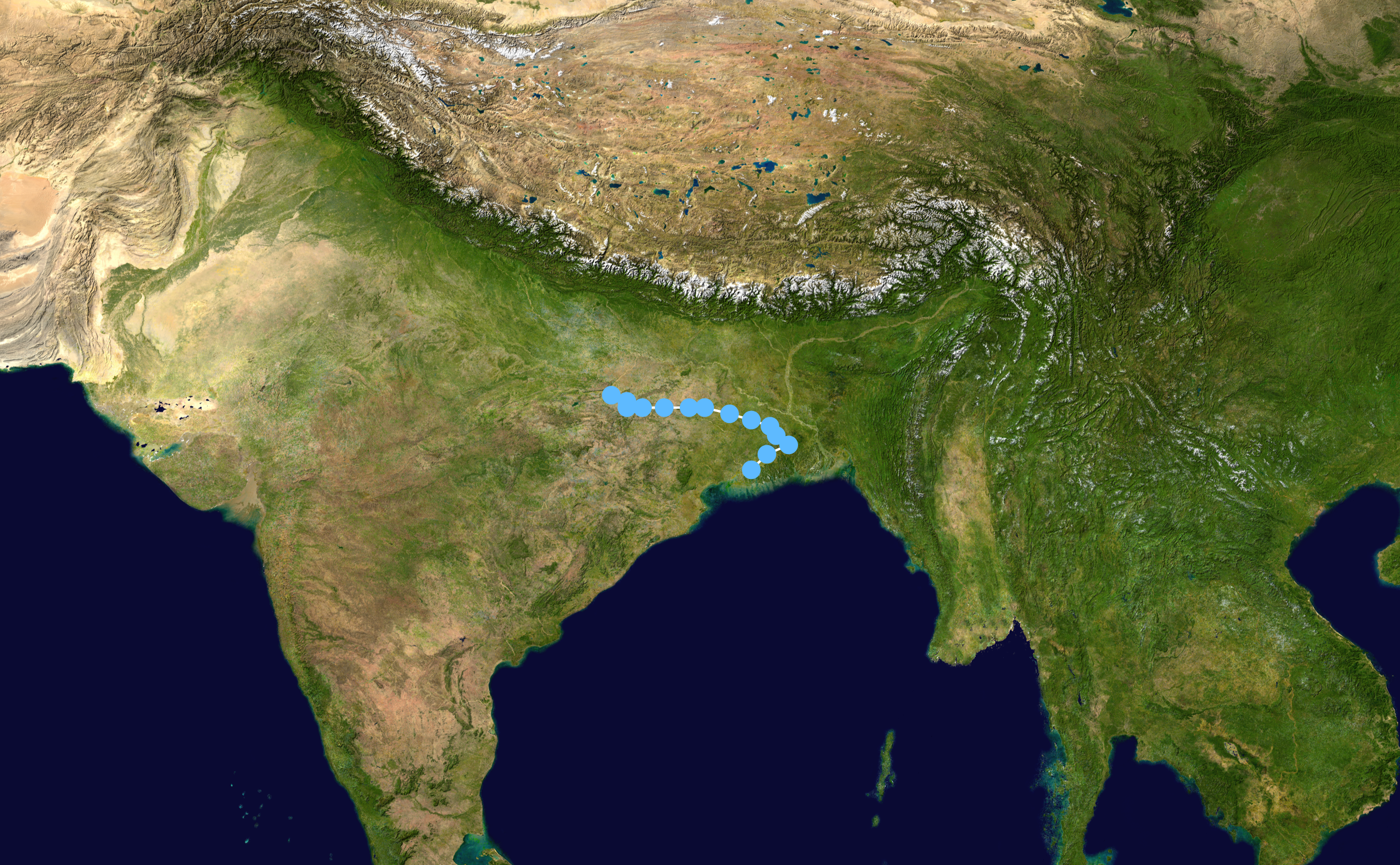
- Duration: 9 August – 12 August
- Peak intensity: 55 km/h (35 mph) (3-min); 994 hPa (mbar)

A well-marked low-pressure area developed into a depression on 9 August, close to Canning, West Bengal, India. On the next day, the system moved northeastward and intensified into a deep depression overland in Bangladesh, about 100 km (62 mi) east-northeast of Kolkata. The deep depression moved towards Jharkhand on 11 August, and quickly weakened into a depression. On 12 August, the land depression degenerated into a well-marked low.

Eight trawlers with a collective 118 fishermen aboard went missing over the Bay of Bengal during the storm; at least 2 people are feared dead. The Indian Coast Guard launched a large-scale search and rescue operation to locate the missing fishermen. All of the trawlers later returned to port, with one requiring assistance due to engine failure. 5 fishermen went missing due to the storm out of which 2 died in the Hugli delta.

Heavy rain fell over districts in West Bengal, such as Birbhum, Purulia, and Bardhaman, and even in Kolkata, which led to flooding in some areas. Flooding also occurred in Jharkhand and West Bengal, due to the increase of river waters in Damodar and Hugli.

=== Deep Depression BOB 02 ===
- Deep depression (IMD)
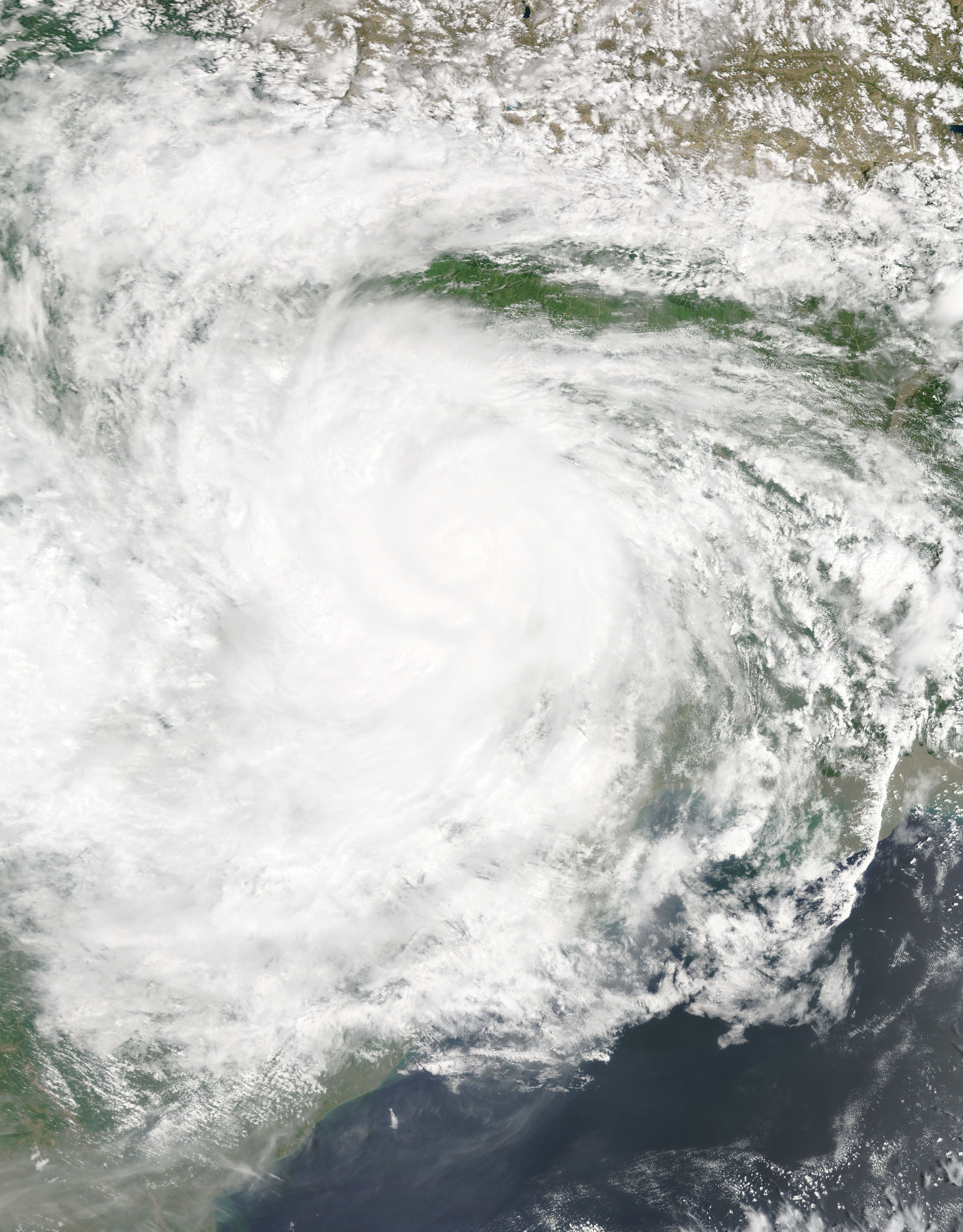
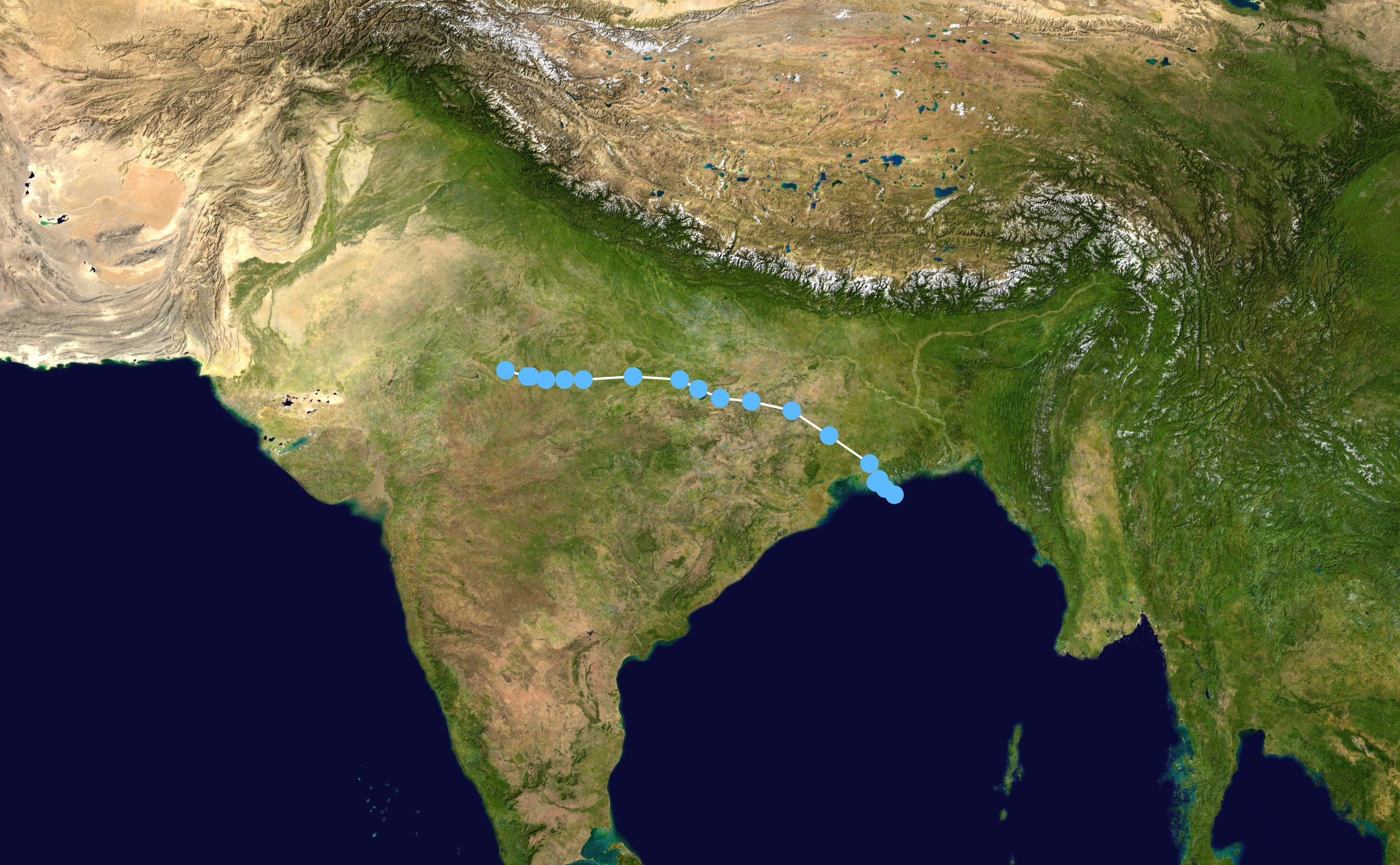
- Duration: 16 August – 20 August
- Peak intensity: 55 km/h (35 mph) (3-min); 994 hPa (mbar)

A low-pressure area formed over the Bay of Bengal in mid-August 2016. It slowly consolidated, prompting the IMD to upgrade the system to a Depression on 16 August. The system slowly moved northwestward and intensified into a deep depression on the following day, before making landfall over the coast of West Bengal between Digha and Diamond Harbour.

The system brought heavy rainfall to the eastern states of India, a region which was experiencing deficient monsoon rains. Chandabali and Balasore in Odisha recorded 146 mm (5.7 in) and 90 mm (3.5 in) of rainfall respectively in a span of 21 hours. Heavy rains fell in West Bengal, including Kolkata, which recorded winds of 70 km/h. At least 6 people died in Kolkata, directly due to the storm. In Jharkhand, two teams of the National Disaster Response Force were deployed in the Garhwa and Chatra districts of the state, amid concerns of a possible flash flood.

=== Cyclonic Storm Kyant ===
- Cyclonic storm (IMD)
- Tropical storm (SSHWS)
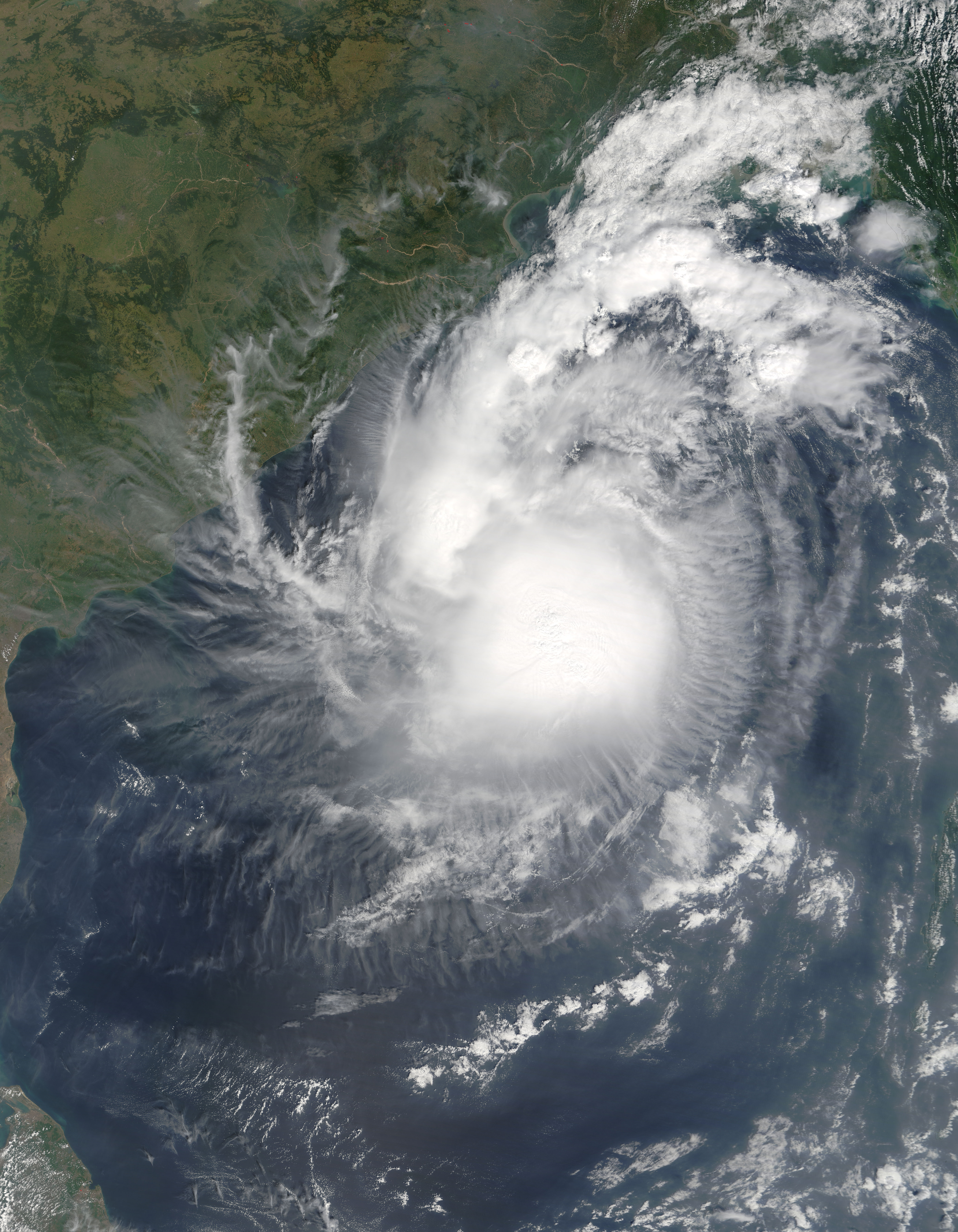
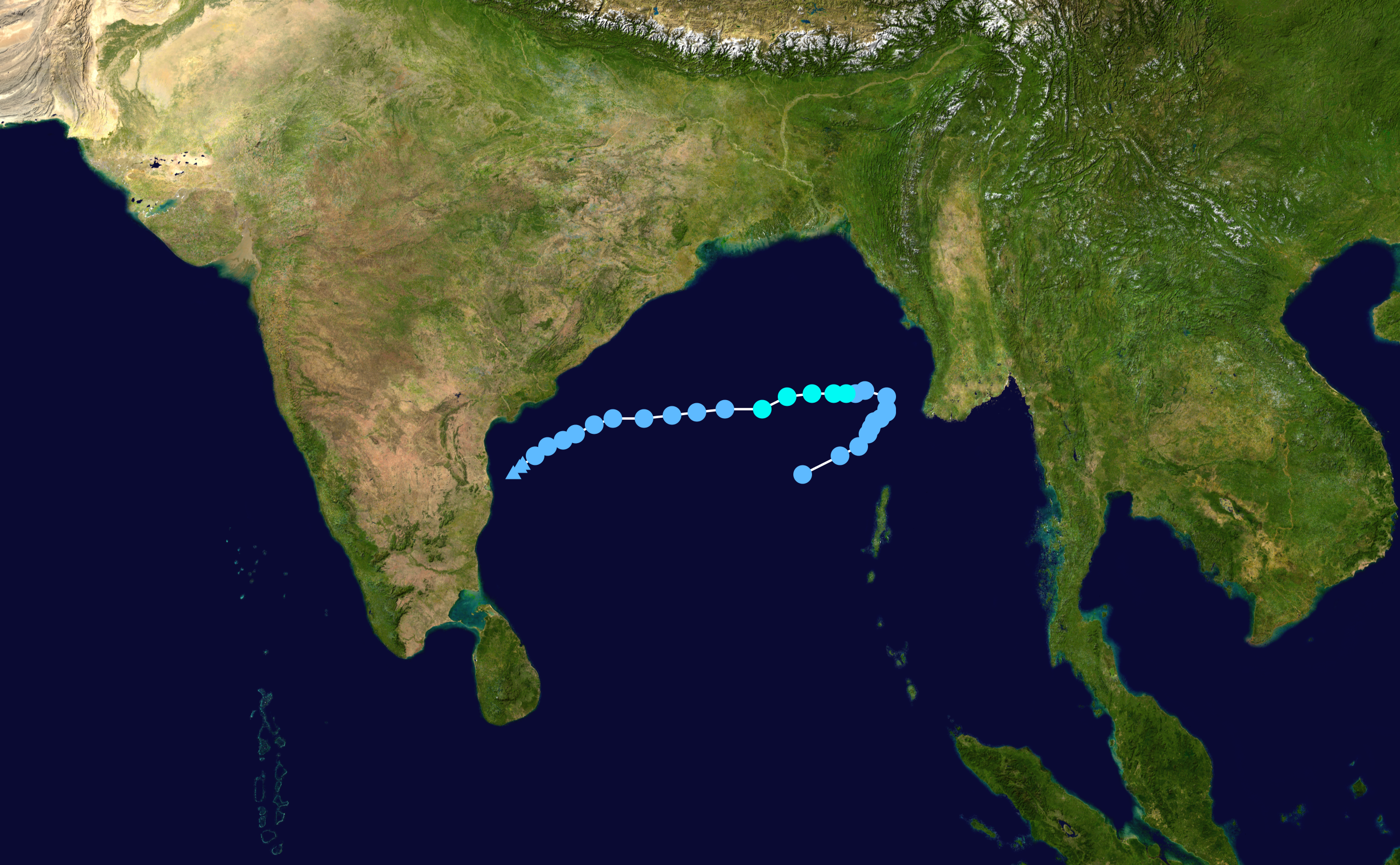
- Duration: 21 October – 28 October
- Peak intensity: 75 km/h (45 mph) (3-min); 996 hPa (mbar)

An area of low pressure formed over east-central Bay of Bengal on 19 October. It slowly consolidated and was upgraded to a Depression on 21 October. The system tracked over a marginally favorable environment, and intensified into a deep depression on 23 October. This was soon followed by the JTWC issuing a Tropical Cyclone Formation Alert (TCFA) for the system. On 24 October, both the IMD and JTWC reported that the storm had reached tropical cyclone strength, with the IMD naming it Kyant. (Note: The name Kyant (Burmese: ကြံ့, [t͡ɕa̰ɴ]) was contributed by Myanmar and means "rhinoceros" in Burmese.) Initially following a northeastward path, the storm re-curved westward off the coast of Myanmar, along the southern periphery of a subtropical ridge, towards the eastern coast of India. Shortly thereafter, Kyant reached its peak intensity, with sustained winds exceeding 85 km/h (55 mph) and a minimal central pressure of 998 mbar (29.47 inHg). Over the next day, the system experienced dry-air intrusion, due to proximity to land, and within a span of six hours, Kyant lost most of its convective structure and rapidly degenerated, as the storm drifted further west-southwestward. The JTWC issued its final warning at 21:00 UTC on 26 October, and Kyant was last noted as a well-marked low-pressure area off the coast of southern Andhra Pradesh, early on 28 October.

=== Depression BOB 04 ===
- Depression (IMD)
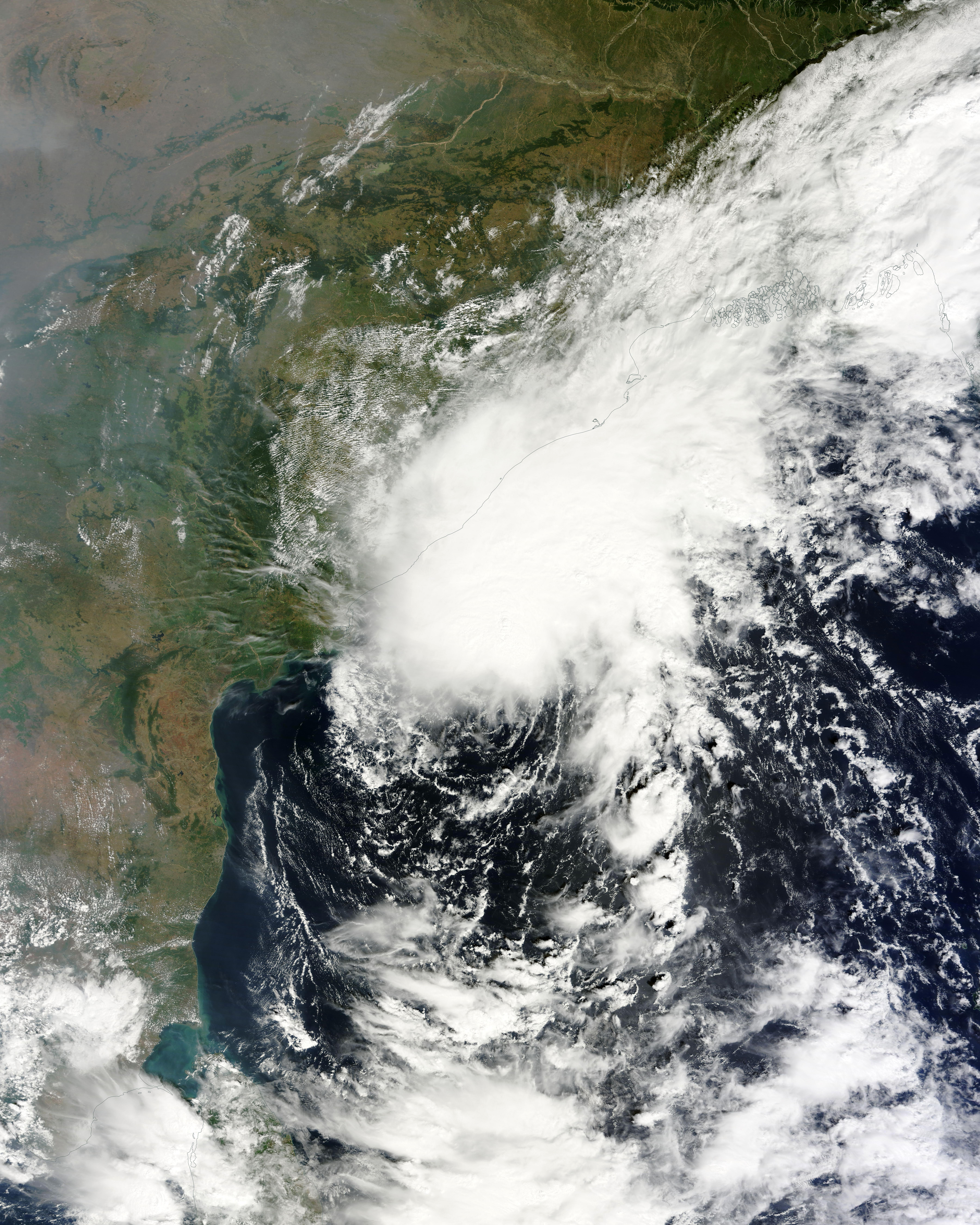
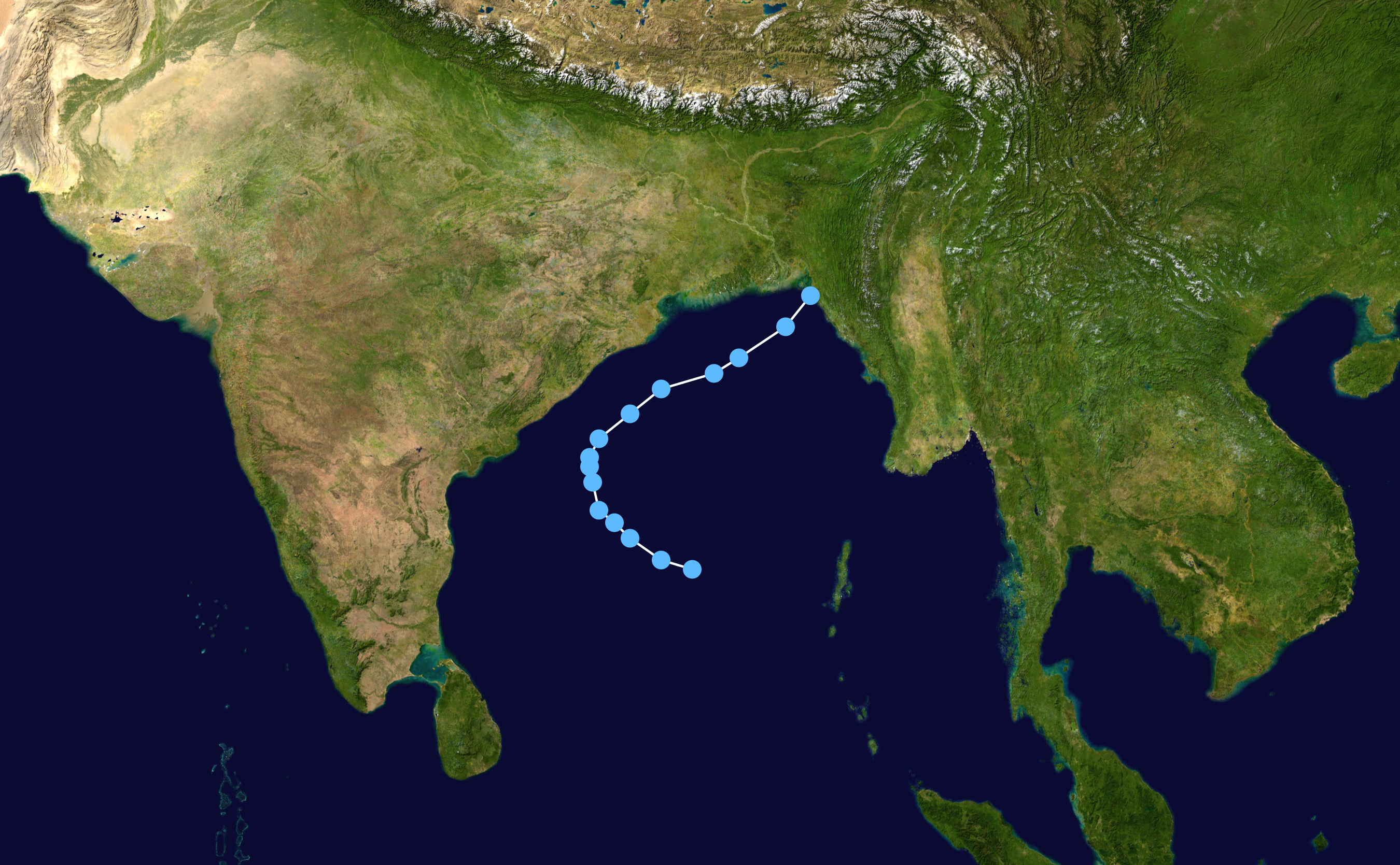
- Duration: 2 November – 6 November
- Peak intensity: 45 km/h (30 mph) (3-min); 997 hPa (mbar)

An area of convection persisted in the Gulf of Thailand on 31 October. Over the next few days, the storm crossed the Malay Peninsula and drifted northwestward into the Bay of Bengal, as it steadily organized. Being located in a highly favorable environment, the system rapidly consolidated, which inclined the JTWC to issue a TCFA on 2 November. The IMD reported that the area of low pressure had organized into a Depression by the next day. However, the storm moved into an area of very high wind shear, prompting the JTWC to cancel the TCFA on 4 November. The system gradually weakened as it tracked along the eastern coast of India over the next two days, and dissipated near southeast Bangladesh on 6 November. Around this time, the weakened system triggered heavy rainfall in the coastal areas of West Bengal and Bangladesh, killing 80 people directly.

=== Cyclonic Storm Nada ===
- Cyclonic storm (IMD)
- Tropical storm (SSHWS)
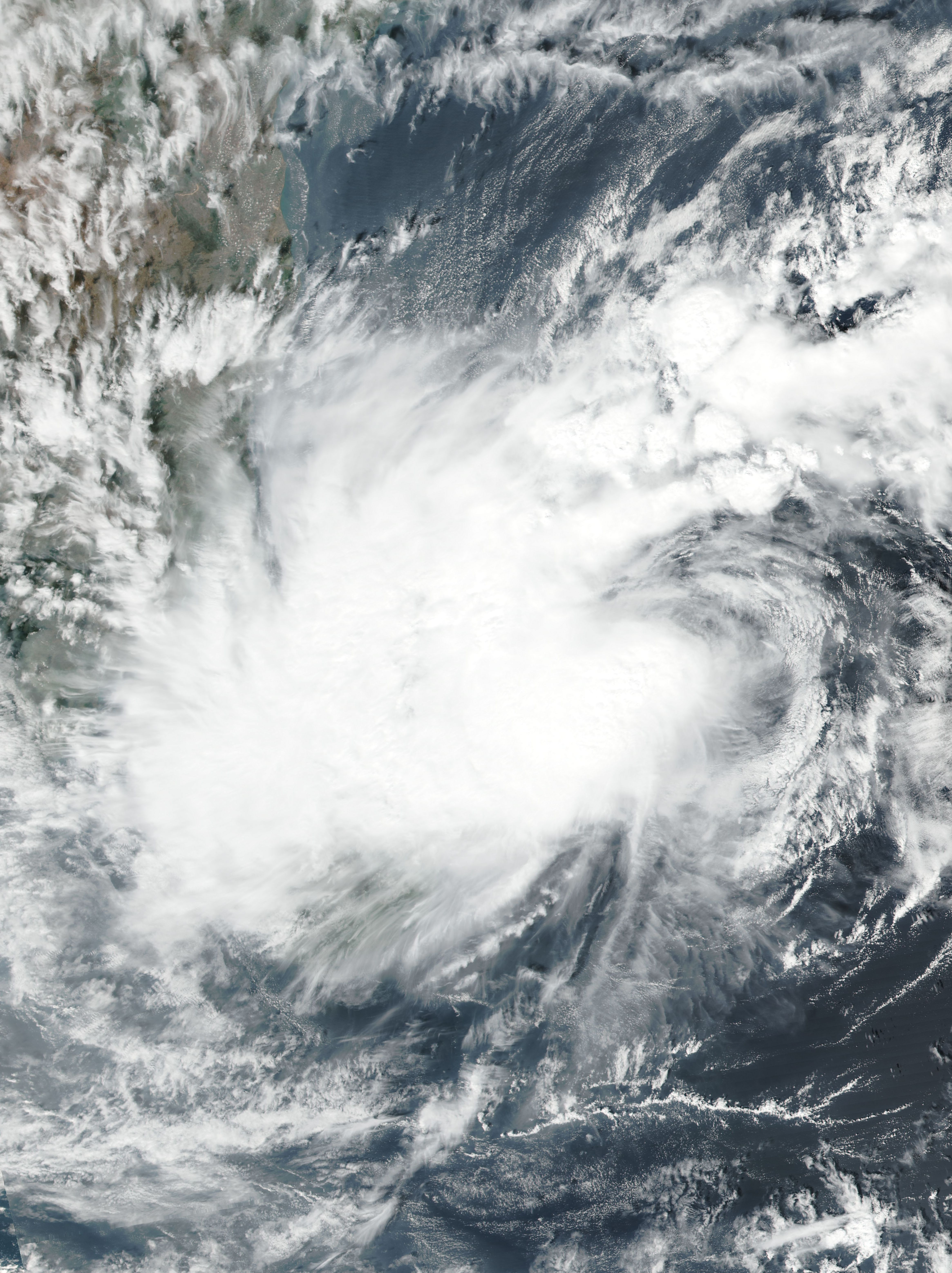
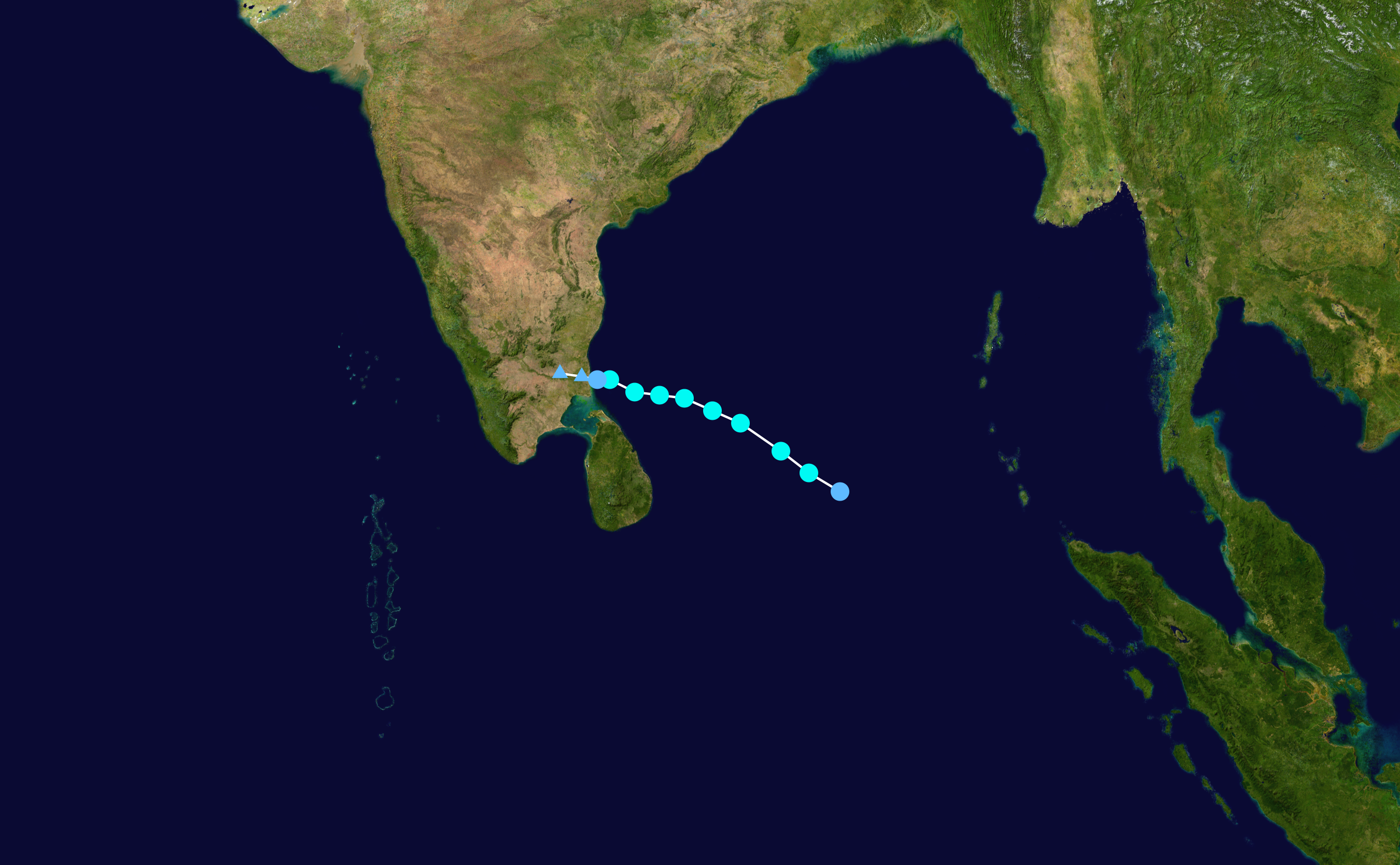
- Duration: 29 November – 2 December
- Peak intensity: 75 km/h (45 mph) (3-min); 1000 hPa (mbar)

Under the influence of a trough, a low-pressure area formed in the extreme southeastern part of the Bay of Bengal in late November. The low-pressure area slowly consolidated, until it strengthened into Depression BOB 05 on 29 November. This was followed by the JTWC issuing a TCFA for the system, while the storm quickly intensified into a deep depression. Remaining as a deep depression for only a short time, the storm quickly intensified into a cyclonic storm, and was named Nada by the IMD. (Note: The name Nada (Arabic: ندى, [nadaː]) was contributed by Oman and means "dew" in Arabic.) Shortly thereafter, the storm reached its peak intensity, with sustained winds exceeding 75 km/h (45 mph) and a minimum central pressure of 1,000 mbar (29.53 inHg). Over the next two days, the storm encountered high wind shear, which combined with land interaction, caused the storm to rapidly weaken. Nada later made landfall on the coast of Tamil Nadu, near Karaikal, as a depression. Soon after landfall, the system was last noted as a well-marked low-pressure area over southern Karnataka, on 2 December.

In the wake of Nada, the schools in Tamil Nadu declared a two-day holiday, in order to be available as cyclone shelters. Heavy rainfall lashed southern India and Sri Lanka. Mamallapuram in Tamil Nadu recorded 110 mm (4.3 in) rainfall within 24 hours on 2 December. Jaffna, Sri Lanka also reported 110 mm (4.3 in) of rainfall. Tirupati airport Recorded a total of 272 mm (10.7 in), which was highest total from the cyclone. 12 deaths were reported, due to incidents related to the storm.

=== Very Severe Cyclonic Storm Vardah ===
- Very severe cyclonic storm (IMD)
- Category 2 tropical cyclone (SSHWS)
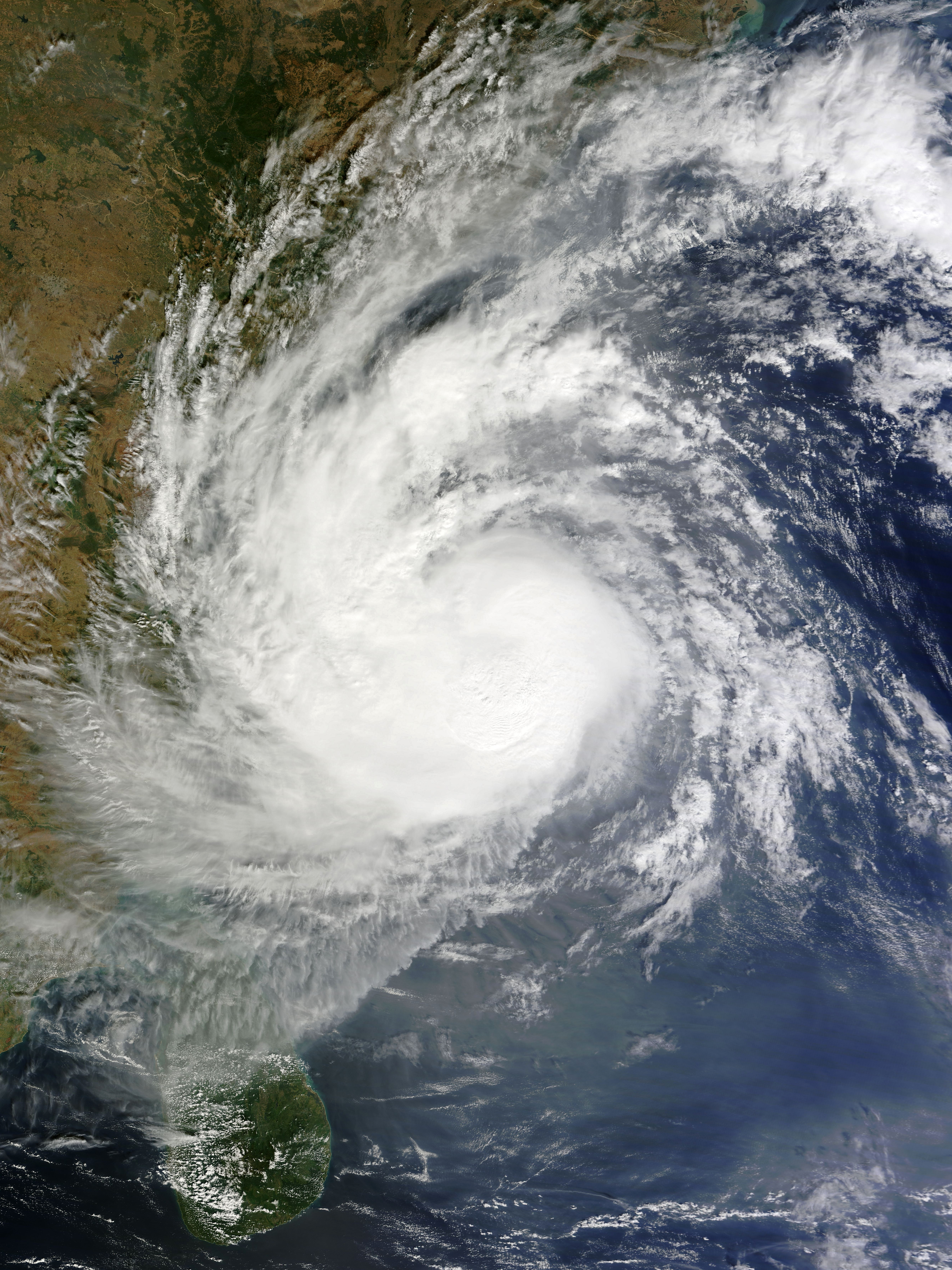
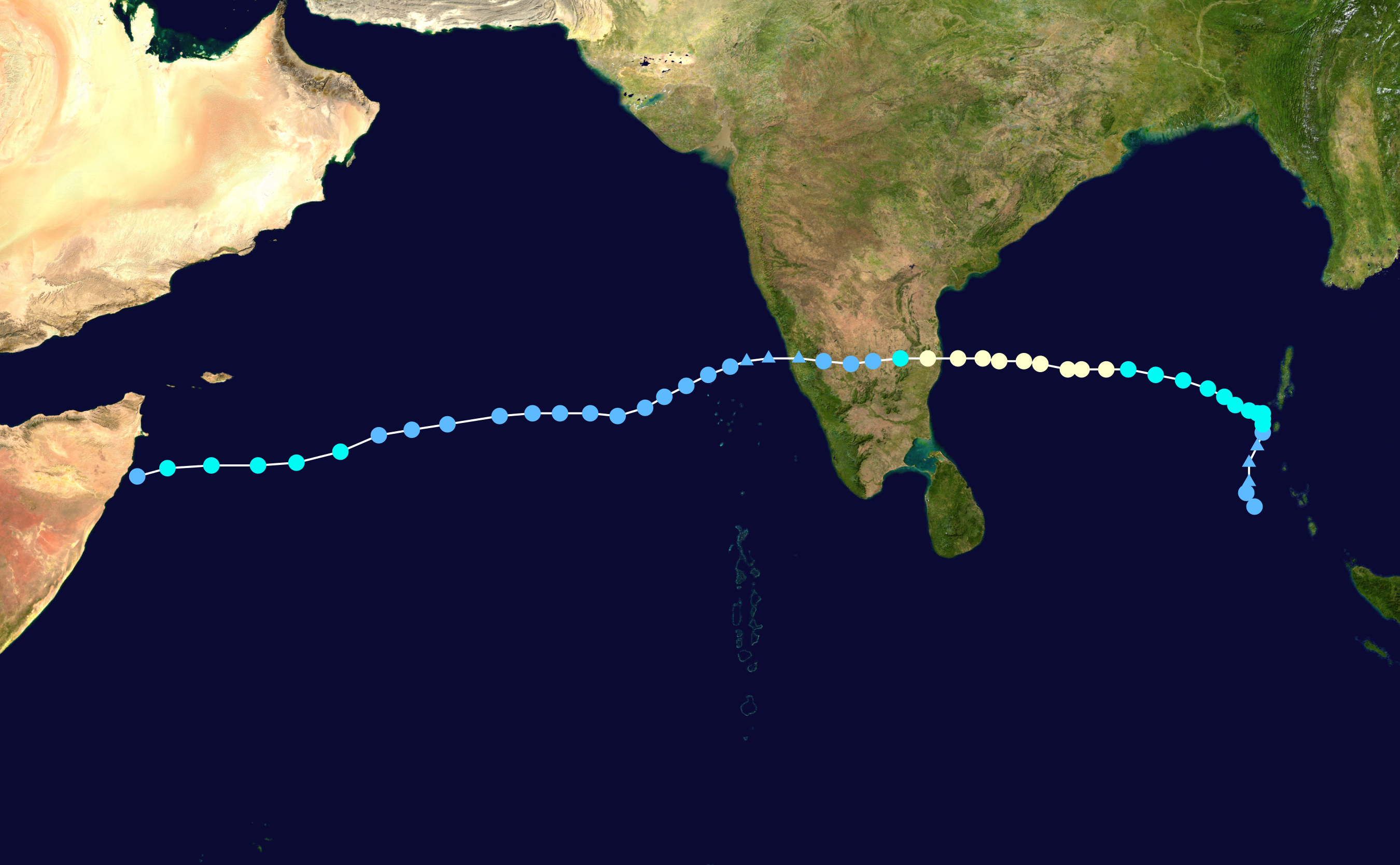
- Duration: 6 December – 13 December
- Peak intensity: 130 km/h (80 mph) (3-min); 975 hPa (mbar)

Under the influence of a persistent area of convection, a low-pressure area formed over the Malay Peninsula, adjoining north Sumatra, in early December 2016. The low-pressure area developed as a tropical disturbance over the next several days, as it slowly moved towards the southeast Bay of Bengal. On 6 December, The IMD classified the system as Depression BOB 06, as it had sufficiently organized itself, with sustained winds of 45 km/h (30 mph). Owing to low wind shear and favorable sea surface temperatures, the storm intensified into a deep depression on the following day. Skirting off the Andaman and Nicobar Islands as a deep depression, BOB 06 was upgraded to a cyclonic storm by the IMD and JTWC, in the early hours of 8 December, and was assigned the name Vardah by the IMD. (Note: The name Vardah (Urdu: وردہ, [ʋərdɑː]) was contributed by Pakistan and means "rose" in Urdu.)

With conditions favorable for further development, Vardah intensified into a severe cyclonic storm on 9 December. Although predicted to maintain its intensity, Vardah strengthened further, as it followed a generally west-northwestward track, prompting the IMD to upgrade its intensity to very severe cyclonic storm status, on 10 December. Gradually intensifying as it moved westward, Vardah reached its peak intensity on 11 December, with maximum 3-minute sustained winds of 130 km/h (80 mph), and a minimum central pressure of 975 mbar (28.79 inHg). On 12 December, Vardah made landfall in southern India and weakened rapidly, before weakening into a remnant low on 13 December. On 14 December, the remnants of Cyclone Vardah crossed the Indian Subcontinent and entered the Arabian Sea on 14 December. Owing to warm sea surface temperatures, the system regenerated into a depression on 17 December, with the IMD assigning the storm a new identifier, ARB 02.

Vardah brought heavy rainfall to Andaman and Nicobar Islands as a deep depression. Hut Bay recorded 166 mm (6.5 in) of rainfall on 6 December, while Port Blair recorded 167 mm (6.6 in) of rainfall on 7 December. More than 1,400 tourists were stranded on the Havelock and Neil islands of the archipelago. The cyclone prompted India's largest evacuation in 2 years, with 16,000 people evacuated. 24 deaths related to the cyclone were reported in the State of Tamil Nadu. The cyclone dumped extreme amounts of rainfall within 24 hours after making landfall, at 382 mm (15.0 in) in Sathyabama University, Chennai, and 341 mm (13.4 in) in Katupakkam, a suburb of Chennai.

=== Depression ARB 02 ===
- Depression (IMD)
- Tropical storm (SSHWS)
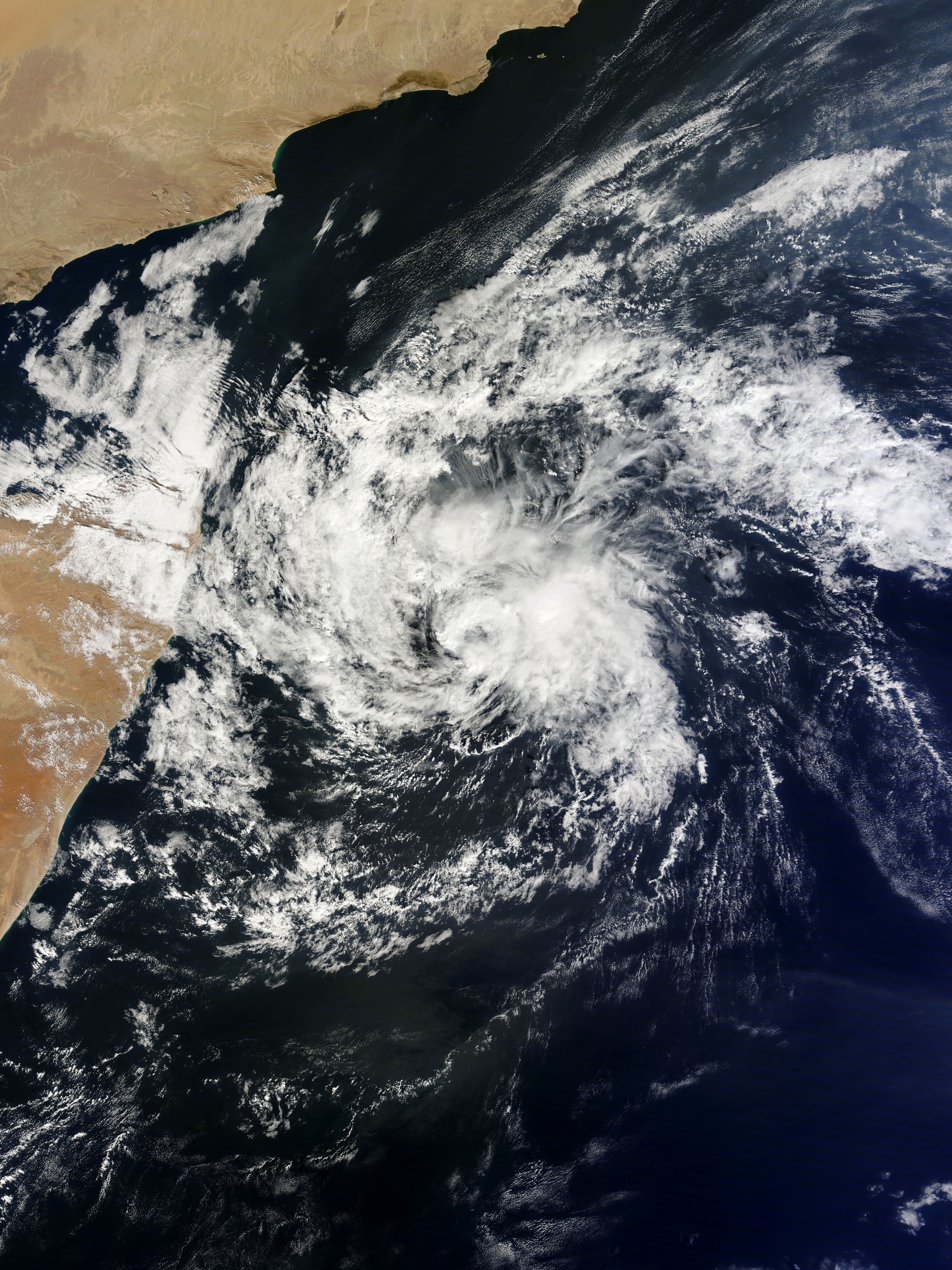
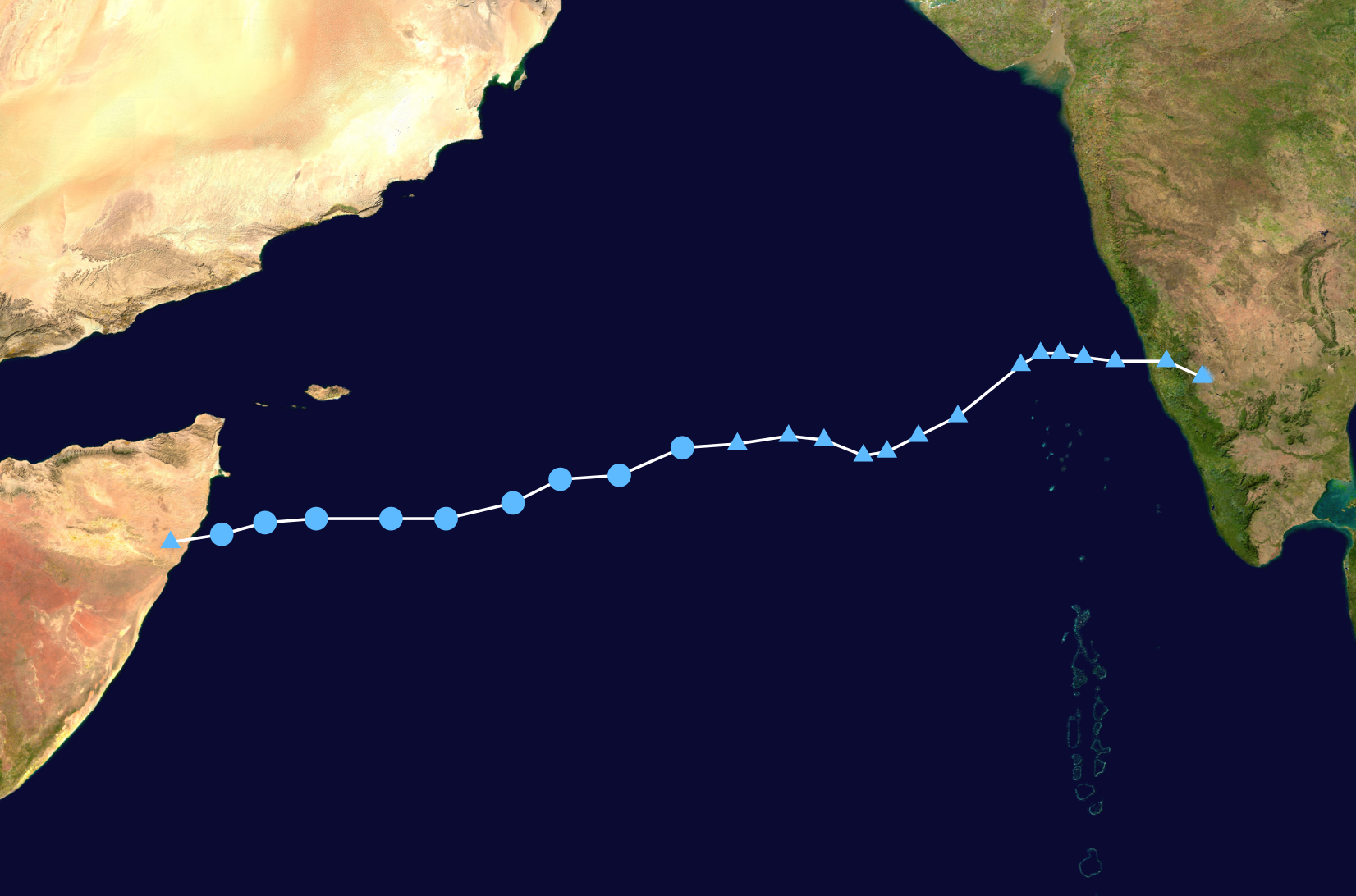
- Duration: 17 December – 18 December
- Peak intensity: 45 km/h (30 mph) (3-min); 994 hPa (mbar)

The remnants of Cyclone Vardah crossed the Indian Subcontinent and entered the Arabian Sea on 14 December. Owing to warm sea surface temperatures, the system regenerated into a depression on 17 December, with the IMD assigning the storm a new identifier, ARB 02. On the next day, the system entered an area marked by colder sea surface temperatures and high wind shear, causing it to rapidly weaken into a well-marked low-pressure area, just off the coast of Somalia.

== Storm names ==
Within this basin, a tropical cyclone is assigned a name when it is judged to have reached Cyclonic Storm intensity with winds of 65 km/h (40 mph).

- Roanu
- Kyant
- Nada
- Vardah

== Season effects ==
This is a table of all storms in the 2016 North Indian Ocean cyclone season. It mentions all of the season's storms and their names, duration, peak intensities (according to the IMD storm scale), damage, and death totals. Damage and death totals include the damage and deaths caused when that storm was a precursor wave or extratropical low, and all of the damage figures are in 2016 USD.

Name	Dates	Peak intensity			Areas affected	Damage (USD)	Deaths	Ref(s).
Name	Dates	Category	Wind speed	Pressure	Areas affected	Damage (USD)	Deaths	Ref(s).
Roanu	17–22 May	Cyclonic storm	85 km/h (55 mph)	983 hPa (29.03 inHg)	Sri Lanka, East coast of India, Bangladesh, Myanmar, Yunnan	$2.03 billion	135	
ARB 01	27–29 June	Depression	45 km/h (30 mph)	996 hPa (29.41 inHg)	Oman, Gujarat	None	None	
LAND 01	6–7 July	Depression	45 km/h (30 mph)	996 hPa (29.41 inHg)	East India	Unknown	None	
LAND 02	9–12 August	Deep depression	55 km/h (35 mph)	994 hPa (29.35 inHg)	East India, Bangladesh	Minimal	20	
BOB 02	16–20 August	Depression	45 km/h (30 mph)	994 hPa (29.35 inHg)	East India, Bangladesh	Unknown	17	
Kyant	21–28 October	Cyclonic storm	75 km/h (45 mph)	996 hPa (29.41 inHg)	Andaman Islands, Myanmar, South India	None	None	
BOB 04	2–6 November	Depression	45 km/h (30 mph)	1,000 hPa (29.53 inHg)	Malaysia, Thailand, West Bengal, Bangladesh	Unknown	80	
Nada	29 November– 2 December	Cyclonic storm	75 km/h (45 mph)	1,000 hPa (29.53 inHg)	Sri Lanka, South India	Unknown	12	
Vardah	6–13 December	Very severe cyclonic storm	130 km/h (80 mph)	975 hPa (28.79 inHg)	Sumatra, Andaman and Nicobar Islands, Thailand, Malaysia, Sri Lanka, Chennai (Tamil Nadu)	$3.37 billion	47	
ARB 02	17–18 December	Depression	45 km/h (30 mph)	994 hPa (29.35 inHg)	Somalia	Unknown	None	
Season aggregates
10 systems	17 May– December 18		130 km/h (80 mph)	975 hPa (28.79 inHg)		$5.4 billion	401	

== See also ==
- Weather of 2016
- Tropical cyclones in 2016
- 2016 Atlantic hurricane season
- 2016 Pacific hurricane season
- 2016 Pacific typhoon season
- South-West Indian Ocean cyclone seasons: 2015–16, 2016–17
- Australian region cyclone seasons: 2015–16, 2016–17
- South Pacific cyclone seasons: 2015–16, 2016–17
- South Atlantic tropical cyclone
