= Cyclone Roanu =

North Indian Ocean cyclone in 2016

Cyclonic Storm Roanu
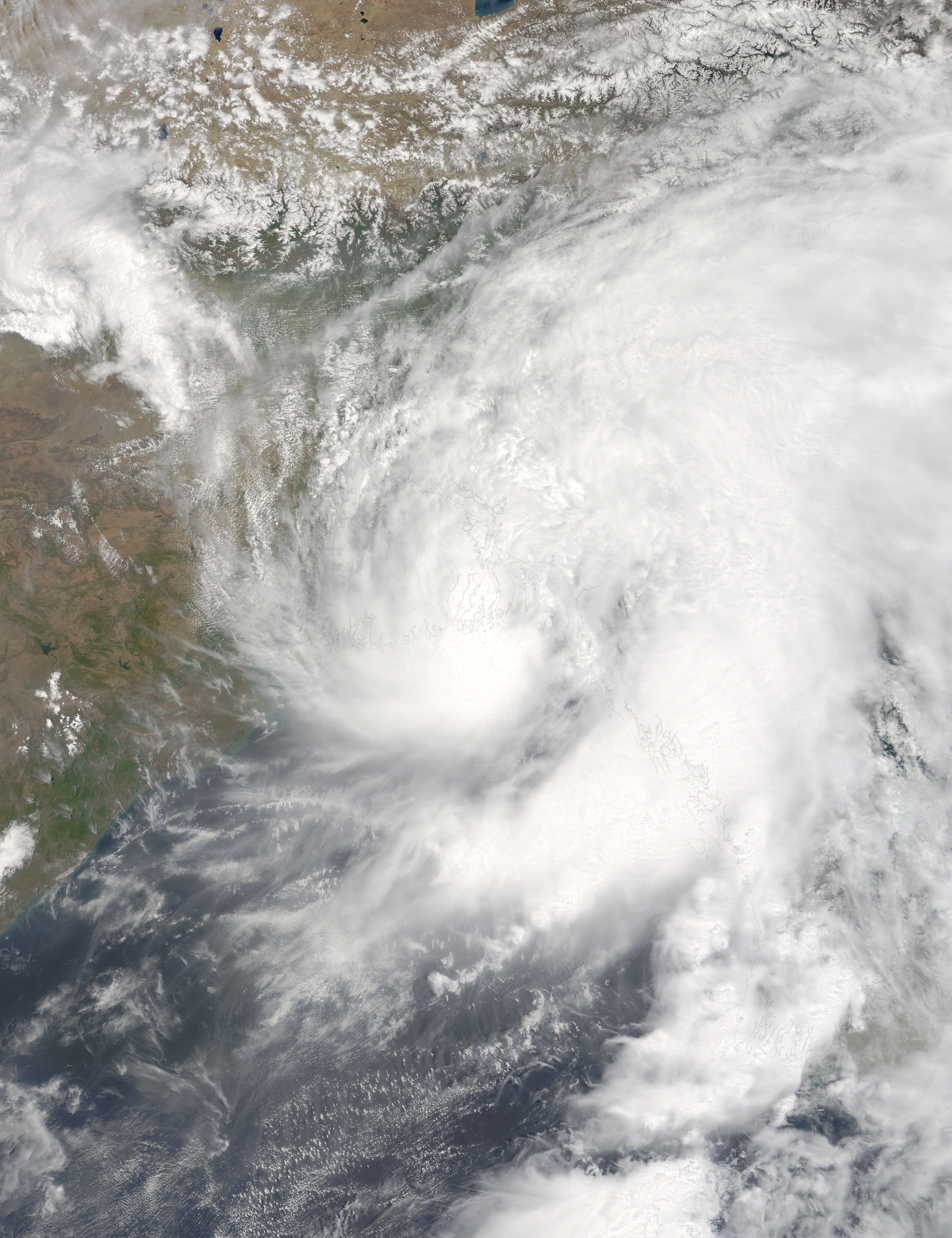
- Cyclone Roanu at peak intensity approaching Bangladesh on 21 May

Meteorological history
- Formed: 19 May 2016
- Remnant low: 22 May 2016
- Dissipated: 23 May 2016

Cyclonic storm
- 3-minute sustained (IMD)
- Highest winds: 85 km/h (50 mph)
- Lowest pressure: 983 hPa (mbar); 29.03 inHg

Tropical storm
- 1-minute sustained (SSHWS/JTWC)
- Highest winds: 110 km/h (70 mph)
- Lowest pressure: 978 hPa (mbar); 28.88 inHg

Overall effects
- Fatalities: 135
- Missing: 99
- Damage: $2.13 billion (2016 USD)
- Areas affected: Sri Lanka, Bangladesh, East coast of India, Myanmar, Yunnan
- IBTrACS
- Part of the 2016 North Indian Ocean cyclone season

Cyclonic Storm Roanu (Note: The name Roanu (Dhivehi: ރޯނު; [ɾoːnu]) was contributed by the Maldives and refers to coil ropes made out of coconut husks in Dhivehi.) was a relatively weak tropical cyclone that caused severe flooding in Sri Lanka and Bangladesh during May 2016. It was the first tropical cyclone of the annual cyclone season. Roanu originated from a low-pressure area that formed south of Sri Lanka, gradually drifted north and intensified into a cyclonic storm on 19 May. However, wind shear and land interaction caused it to weaken slightly, before reintensifying as it accelerated towards the coast of Bangladesh.

The storm was responsible for 105 deaths in Sri Lanka and another 30 deaths in Bangladesh. A further 99 persons in Sri Lanka were reported missing. Damage throughout Sri Lanka reached US$2 billion. Roanu also brought torrential rainfall to the Indian states of Tamil Nadu, Andhra Pradesh, Kerala and Odisha as it drifted in a generally northeastward direction, close to the coast.

== Meteorological history ==
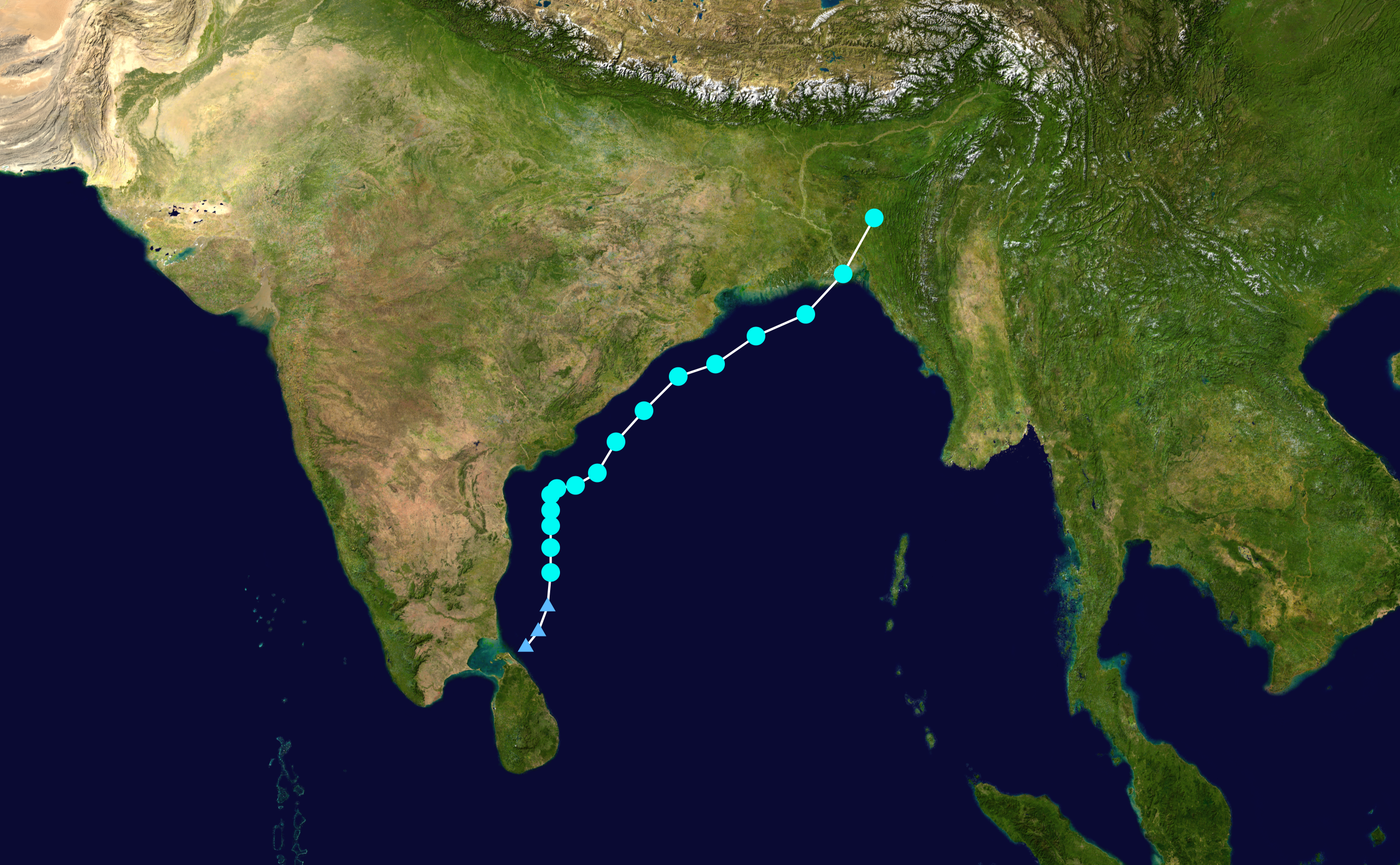
Map plotting the storm's track and intensity, according to the Saffir–Simpson scale Map key Saffir–Simpson scale Tropical depression (≤38 mph, ≤62 km/h) Tropical storm (39–73 mph, 63–118 km/h) Category 1 (74–95 mph, 119–153 km/h) Category 2 (96–110 mph, 154–177 km/h) Category 3 (111–129 mph, 178–208 km/h) Category 4 (130–156 mph, 209–251 km/h) Category 5 (≥157 mph, ≥252 km/h) Unknown Storm type Tropical cyclone Subtropical cyclone Extratropical cyclone, remnant low, tropical disturbance, or monsoon depression

Under the influence of a trough, a low-pressure area formed over the Bay of Bengal on 14 May. It slowly consolidated as it paralleled the east coast of Sri Lanka, prompting the India Meteorological Department (IMD) to classify it as a depression on 17 May. Late the same day, the Joint Typhoon Warning Center (JTWC) issued a Tropical Cyclone Formation Alert (TCFA), soon after which the JTWC upgraded the system to a tropical storm. Simultaneously, the IMD upgraded the storm to a Deep Depression, prompting the issuance of cyclone warnings for the states of Andhra Pradesh and Odisha. On 19 May, the IMD reported that the storm had reached cyclonic storm intensity, and assigned it the name Roanu.

At the time, Roanu was tracking slowly northward along the northern periphery of a subtropical ridge located over the Malay Peninsula. Despite favorable outflow and warm sea surface temperatures (SSTs) reaching 31 °C (88 °F), its proximity to land and moderate vertical wind shear kept the storm from intensifying rapidly. The diurnal temperature variation over land and the persistent wind shear began to affect the deep convection obscuring the low-level circulation center (LLCC). In the late hours of that day, Roanu showed a weakening trend after most of the convection covering the LLCC was sheared off. During that time, Roanu was located approximately 150 kilometres (93 mi) from Visakhapatnam. However, the wind shear soon decreased, and the storm reestablished deep convection over and around the LLCC, forming a central dense overcast in a period of 6 hours. SSMIS imagery revealed tightly curved rainbands wrapped into the LLCC. As a result, Roanu re-intensified as it accelerated east-northeastwards towards the coast of Bangladesh, and reached its peak intensity with winds of 85 km/h (55 mph) and a minimum central pressure of 983 hPa (mbar; 29.03 inHg). On 21 May, Roanu made landfall just northwest of Chittagong, Bangladesh. Continuing to accelerate inland, Roanu steadily weakened and degenerated into a remnant low on the next day.

== Preparations ==
Preparations for the storm began even before the IMD started tracking it as a depression. As the area of low pressure tracked closer to the country, the Meteorology Department of Sri Lanka issued a warning on 13 May stating that the disturbance would affect the country. Fishermen were advised to be vigilant. On 14 May 2016 the Meteorology Department issued a severe weather advisory for twelve hours commencing 11:30 IST. Up to 100mm of rain was expected in parts of eastern and southern Sri Lanka with wind speeds up to 70-80 kmh at sea. Later, The National Building Research Organisation (NBRO) issued landslide warning in the districts of Badulla, Monaragala, Kandy, Ratnapura, Kurunegala, Nuwara Eliya, Kegalle and Matale. President Maithripala Sirisena instructed the local authorities to provide relief to those affected by the system. The Minister Of Disaster Management, Defense Secretary, Tri Forces' Commanders and the Inspector General Of Police were instructed to undertake the operation. The Road Development Authority waived Tolls on the Southern Expressway between Kottawa to Kadawatha due to the weather. Schools in Central Province, North Western Province, Sabaragamuwa Province and Western Province are closed due to the floods. As water levels on the Kelani River rose rapidly, the DMC warned those living near its banks to move to safety. The Ceylon Electricity Board imposed emergency power cuts on the Colombo suburbs of Kohilawatte, Kolonnawa, Kotikawatte, Orugodawatta, Sedawatta, Sinhapura and Wellampitiya as a precautionary measure. Overnight the army and navy evacuated 26,000 people affected by the floods in Colombo. All schools in the country were closed on 20 May 2016.

== Impact ==
Deaths and damage by countries
| Countries | Fatalities | Missing | Damage (2016 USD) | Sources |
|---|---|---|---|---|
| Sri Lanka | 105 | 99 | $2 billion | |
| Bangladesh | 30 | None | $127 million | |
| India | None | None | Minimal | |
| Totals: | 135 | 99 | $2.13 billion | |

=== Sri Lanka ===
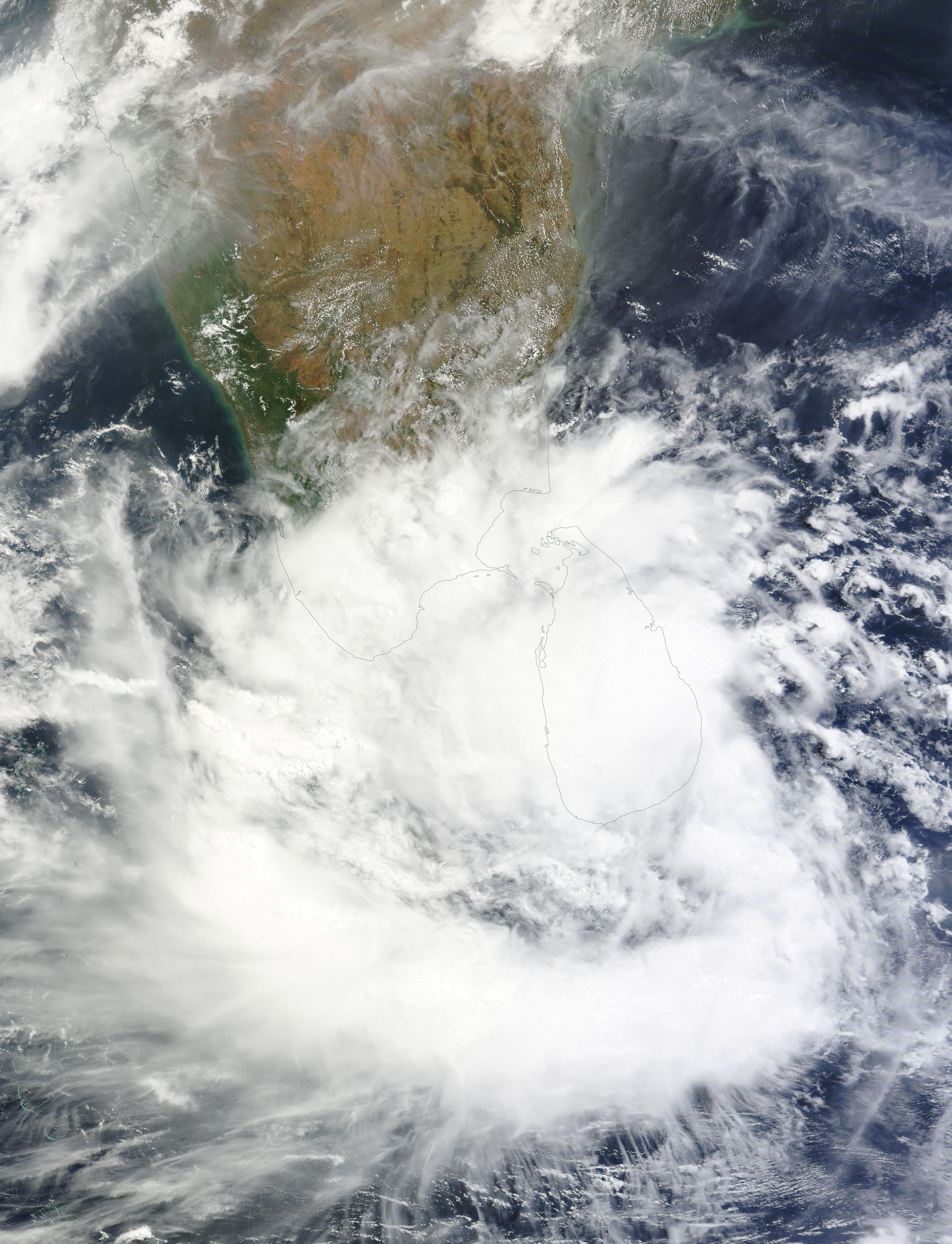
The precursor to Cyclone Roanu over Sri Lanka on 15 May.

As a depression, the cyclone brought torrential rains to Sri Lanka, causing flash flooding and landslides that killed 104 people. There were also 99 people reported missing. Additionally, the storm displaced over 134,000 people. Damage throughout Sri Lanka reached US$2 billion.

On 15 May, 137.7 mm (5.42 in) of rain was recorded in Katunayake. 373.3mm of rain fell on Kilinochchi in the 24 hours to 8.30 a.m. on 16 May 2016. Several parts of the capital Colombo were flooded. More than 35 families in Nalluruwa were displaced after a gale hit their homes. Bad weather forced two flights bound for Bandaranaike International Airport (BIA) to be diverted to Cochin International Airport. A landslide in Hattota near Dehiowita in Kegalle District left four dead and one missing.

Sri Lankan Disaster Management Centre (DMC) issued a flood alert on 16 May as the low-pressure area brought heavy rains to the country. The Kelani River and Maha Oya swelled as a result of the rainfall. With water levels on the Attanagalu Oya, Kalu Ganga, Kelani River, Maha Oya, Mahaweli River, Nilwala Ganga and Yan Oya rising, the Disaster Management Center (DMC) warned people living on river banks and low-lying areas in Badalgama, Dunamale, Giriulla, Hanwella, Horowpatana, Nawalapitiya, Panadugama, Peradeniya, and Ratnapura to be vigilant. The Sri Lankan Disaster Management Centre said that areas of the nation received the highest amount of rainfall since 2010. Landslides buried three villages in Kegalle District. Power failures were reported in several villages. Flights leaving Ratmalana Airport were grounded due to heavy rain. The Southern Expressway's exit at Biyagama was closed due to flooding. Heavy rains and floods affected Chilaw, Colombo, Galle, Kalutara, Kandy, Kegalle, Matara, Nuwara Eliya and Ratnapura and one person was killed by lightning in Anuradhapura. The Sri Lanka Air Force (SLAF) rescued fishermen off Pitipana near Negombo in Gampaha District after their boat capsized. A landslide in Ilukkwatta near Kadugannawa in Kandy District buried two homes under 25 feet of mud, rock and rubble, killing seven. A landslide in Samsarakanda near Aranayaka in Kegalle District buried several homes, killing 21 and leaving 123 missing. The villages of Elangapitiya, Pallebage and Siripura were buried in the landslide. A landslide at Kalupahana Estate near Bulathkohupitiya in Kegalle District buried several homes, killing 14 and leaving two missing. Two boys were killed in Wattala due to the floods. The Outer Circular Expressway was flooded at Kaduwela. With roads underwater and impassable, the Wilpattu National Park was closed until 25 May 2016. Water levels on the Kelani River, which had peaked at 8 feet, began to fall slowly on 19 May 2016 and had fallen to six feet by 22 May 2016. Two people were killed in Ambulgama near Hanwella on 20 May 2016 after the boat they were in capsized in flood waters. A landslide was reported in Kabaragalakanda near Aranayake on 21 May 2016.

=== India ===
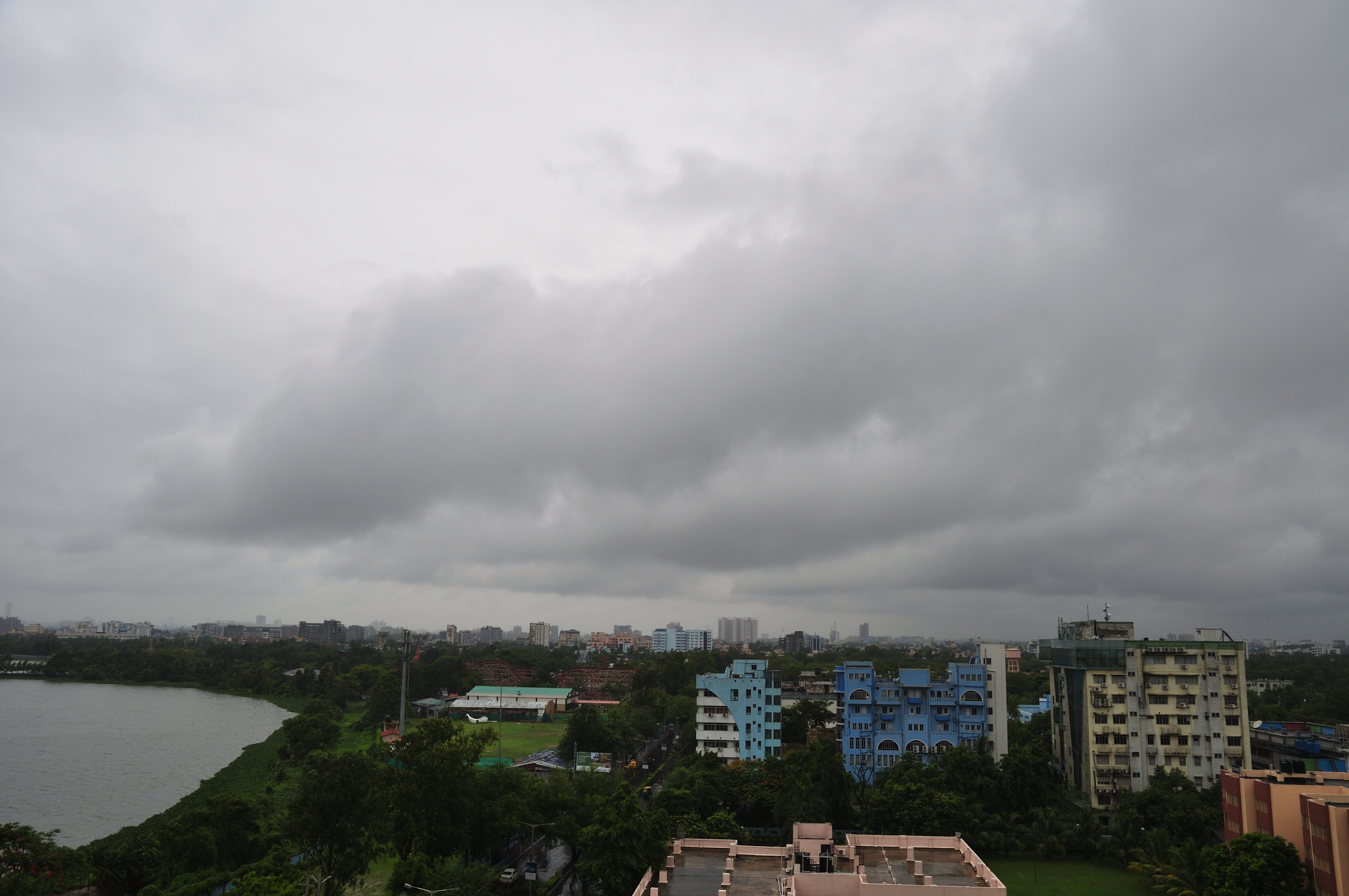
Fracto-Cumulus over Kolkata.

Parts of Chennai and Tamil Nadu received between 93 mm (3.7 in) and 116.0 mm (4.57 in) of rain in a period of 24 hours. Kelambakkam, Chennai, received 226 mm of rainfall on 19 May. Later reports indicated that the city had received the highest rainfall in the month of May in over 2 decades. 12,000 personnel were deployed in the city to aid rescue operations. Multiple boats were stationed around the city for emergency rescue. In the low-lying areas, the National Disaster Response Force positioned 4 teams of personnel. An emergency number (1070) was set up. The IMD put the states of Andhra Pradesh and Odisha on an orange alert (the second highest level of emergency in India) on 19 May. The city of Kakinada recorded 174 mm (6.9 in) of rain in a day, the highest reported in the past 10 years. Bapatla reported 134 mm (5.3 in) of rain. Visakhapatnam District, Vizianagaram District and Srikakulam District were also affected by rains and were forecast to receive up to 210 mm (8.3 in) by 21 May. Chief Minister of Andhra Pradesh N. Chandrababu Naidu positioned 5 teams, each consisting of 100 personnel, in Krishna, East Godavari and Visakhapatnam districts.

Under the influence of the system, various places in Odisha received moderate to heavy rainfall. The reported rainfall was 96 mm (3.8 in) in Paradip and 85 mm (3.3 in) in Puri. Chief Minister of Odisha Naveen Patnaik readied 10 teams of Odisha Disaster Rapid Action Force and fire service personnel. Government of Odisha issued an alert in at least 12 districts in coastal, southern and northern regions of the state. The maximum temperature in Bhubaneshwar on 20 May was 26.2 °C (79.2 °F) compared to the average daily maximum temperature of 37.2 °C (99.0 °F) for the month of May. In West Bengal, Digha received 73 mm (2.9 in) of rainfall and Sagar Island received 96 mm (3.8 in) as the cyclone inched closer.

=== Bangladesh ===
An animation depicting Roanu nearing landfall over Bangladesh.

Before the cyclone made landfall, over half a million people had been taken into shelters by the Government of Bangladesh. All flights at Shah Amanat International Airport were suspended. Restrictions were imposed on the movement of ships and ferries by Bangladesh Inland Water Transport Authority.

A storm surge up to 7 ft (2.0 m) above the astronomical tide hit the coast of Bangladesh at afternoon. The cyclone approached the land over the coast at Sandwip, Hatia, Kutubdia, Sitakundu and Feni. The cyclone caused at least 26 deaths in seven districts across the country. 30 people died when Roanu hit the county, most of them died when the cyclone's storm surge overtopped dams. Around 40,000 homesteads and business houses were damaged.

The storm disrupted electricity supply and road communications in the areas. Food storage, seasonal crops were damaged. Livestock, including fish and shrimp firms were swept away. Damage across the nation were estimated at ৳10 billion (US$127 million).

== Aftermath ==
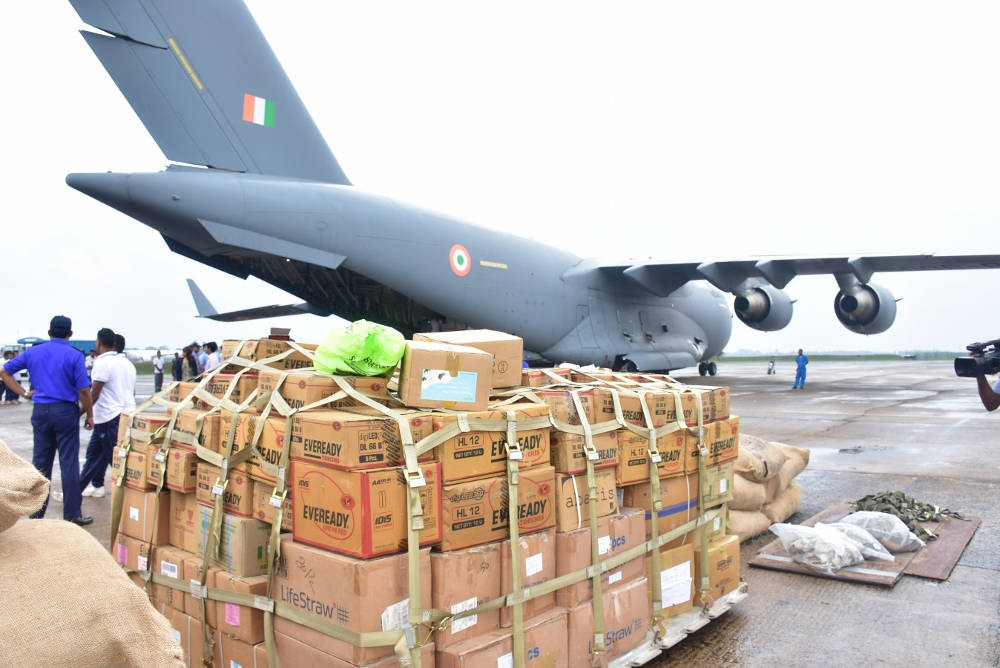
An Indian Air Force Boeing C-17 transport aircraft that brought around 50 tonnes of relief material, at Katunayake Airport.

The Sri Lanka Army deployed more than 1500 Army personnel and 71 officers, including Commandos in worst-affected areas across the country for immediate search, rescue and relief operations and the Army on the directions of the Commander has organized another emergency contingent to stand by in case the situation worsens. The Sri Lanka Air Force dispatched Bell 212, Bell 412 and Mi 17 helicopters for rescue operations and providing of relief aid to victims. The Sri Lanka Navy dispatched 81 flood relief teams in areas such as Thalduwa, Hanwella, Ranala, Navagamuwa, Malwana, Kegalle, Kaduwela, Mulleriyawa, Dompe, Pugoda, Wellampitiya, Kollonnawa, Biyagama, Kotikawatta, Angoda, Kelanimulla, Vavunia, Vilachchiya and Mandagalaru to promptly engage in any adverse situation. Besides 40 more flood relief teams are kept on standby covering all the areas affected by floods to meet any emergency situation. Rescue operations began soon after the storm, on 18 May, with Sri Lankan military personnel searching for missing people in rural areas. 115 soldiers reportedly searched the villages buried by the landslides in attempt to find any survivors. Over 200 people trapped by flooding in Thabbowa in Puttalam District were rescued by the SLAF and Sri Lanka Navy. The Sri Lanka Army, with the help of villagers, volunteers and medical staff, began rescue efforts at Aranayaka and Bulathkohupitiya. At least 50 people were rescued from the hardest-hit areas in the Kegalle District. However, another spell of heavy rain on 19 May disrupted the operations. Mud in some villages was reportedly as high as 75 ft (23 m). Major General Sudantha Ranasinghe, the officer in charge of the rescue operation, later told that the authorities had begun to give up the rescue operations. The death toll was confirmed to be 58. By the evening of 19 May, rescuers feared that the remaining 134 people missing were dead. On 20 May, the Indian Navy Southern Naval Command sent its ships INS Sunayna and HMIS Sutlej with relief material to the capital city, Colombo. Australian Minister for Foreign Affairs Julie Bishop pledged assistance to Sri Lanka, saying "The Australian Government stands ready to provide any assistance that our Sri Lankan friends may require in responding to this disaster." Pakistan's Government also sent field hospital and relief materials. As the search operations resumed that day, rescuers continued recovering bodies of those buried in the landslides which also reportedly destroyed 66 houses in Elangapitiya. 200,000 people had to escape from the low-lying areas of Colombo on rubber dinghies and makeshift rafts. A total of 101 deaths and 100 missing persons have been reported. The Sri Lanka national cricket team donated රු.1,000,000 (US$6,869) to the victims of Roanu.

Prior to the floods Sri Lanka was suffering a drought and consequently power cuts as reservoirs ran dry. Following the floods water levels in many of the reservoirs reached 75%, giving uninterrupted power supply according to the Ministry of Power and Energy.

Unable to cope with the extent of the floods, the Sri Lankan government appealed for international assistance. Indian Prime Minister Narendra Modi pledged Sri Lanka to provide assistance in dealing with the disaster which caused by cyclone Roanu. On 20 May the Indian Navy ships INS Sunayna and INS Sutlej arrived in Colombo with relief material. A flight from India arrived at BIA on 21 May carrying humanitarian aid. Pakistan announced it would send a 30-bed field hospital and relief materials. Nepal offered $100,000 towards the relief operation. The Singapore Red Cross announced that it will distribute US$150,000 in relief items to survivors, and has a team on standby to assist in relief work. A flight from Japan arrived at BIA on 21 May carrying emergency relief items such as blankets, generators, water purifiers and water tanks. Australian Foreign Minister Julie Bishop promised to provide any assistance to Sri Lankan government following the damages from landslides and floods. Australia has offered to contribute $500,000 to UNICEF for humanitarian assistance such as the provision of clean water and sanitation for children in shelters. The United States Embassy in Colombo announced on 20 May that Rs.7.2 million (US$50,000) would be provided for immediate emergency relief items such as blankets, clothing, hygiene kits and mattresses whilst a three-year program totaling Rs.144 million (US$1 million) would provide safe, disaster-resilient drinking water for populations highly vulnerable to flooding and droughts. On 20 May, the Commonwealth Secretary-General Patricia Scotland expressed her profound on the victims of landslides in Sri Lanka, following the heavy rain. The United Nations Office for the Coordination of Humanitarian Affairs has said that it and international NGOs were helping the Sri Lankan government with relief efforts on the ground.

== See also ==
- Cyclone Bijli
- Cyclone Laila
- Cyclone Viyaru
- Cyclone Fani
