= Ivette =

- Gender: Female
- Language: Spanish, Portuguese

Origin
- Meaning: yew

Other names
- Alternative spelling: Ivete

Ivette or Ivete is a female given name. It is a variation of the French name Yvette.

Notable people with the name include:

- Ivette Cordovez (born 1979), Panamanian news presenter, actress and model
- Ivette Ezeta Salcedo (born 1969), Mexican politician
- Ivette Fuentes (born 1972), theoretical physicist
- Ivette López (born 1990), Spanish tennis player
- Ivette María (born 1975), Spanish backstroke swimmer
- Ivette Muhammad, American politician
- Ivette Jacqueline Ramírez Corral (born 1981), Mexican politician
- Ivete Sangalo (born 1972), Brazilian singer-songwriter

== See also ==
- List of storms named Ivette
