= List of storms named Ivette =

The name Ivette or Yvette has been used for five tropical cyclones worldwide.

In the Eastern Pacific Ocean:

- Tropical Storm Ivette (2016) – formed in the open ocean.
- Tropical Storm Ivette (2022) – did not affect land.

In the Western Pacific Ocean:

- Typhoon Yvette (1992) (T9223, 22W, Ningning) – Category 5 super typhoon that stayed at sea.
- Typhoon Yvette (1995) (T9527, 27W, Oniang) – Category 1 typhoon that struck Vietnam as a severe tropical storm.

In the Australian region:

- Cyclone Yvette (2016) – did not affect land.
