= Ivette Jacqueline Ramírez Corral =

Mexican politician

- Born: 25 January 1981 (age 45); Sonora, Mexico
- Occupation: Politician
- Political party: PAN

Ivette Jacqueline Ramírez Corral (born 25 January 1981) is a Mexican politician from the National Action Party. From 2008 to 2009 she served as Deputy of the LX Legislature of the Mexican Congress representing Sonora.
