= 2016–17 Australian region cyclone season =

Tropical cyclone season

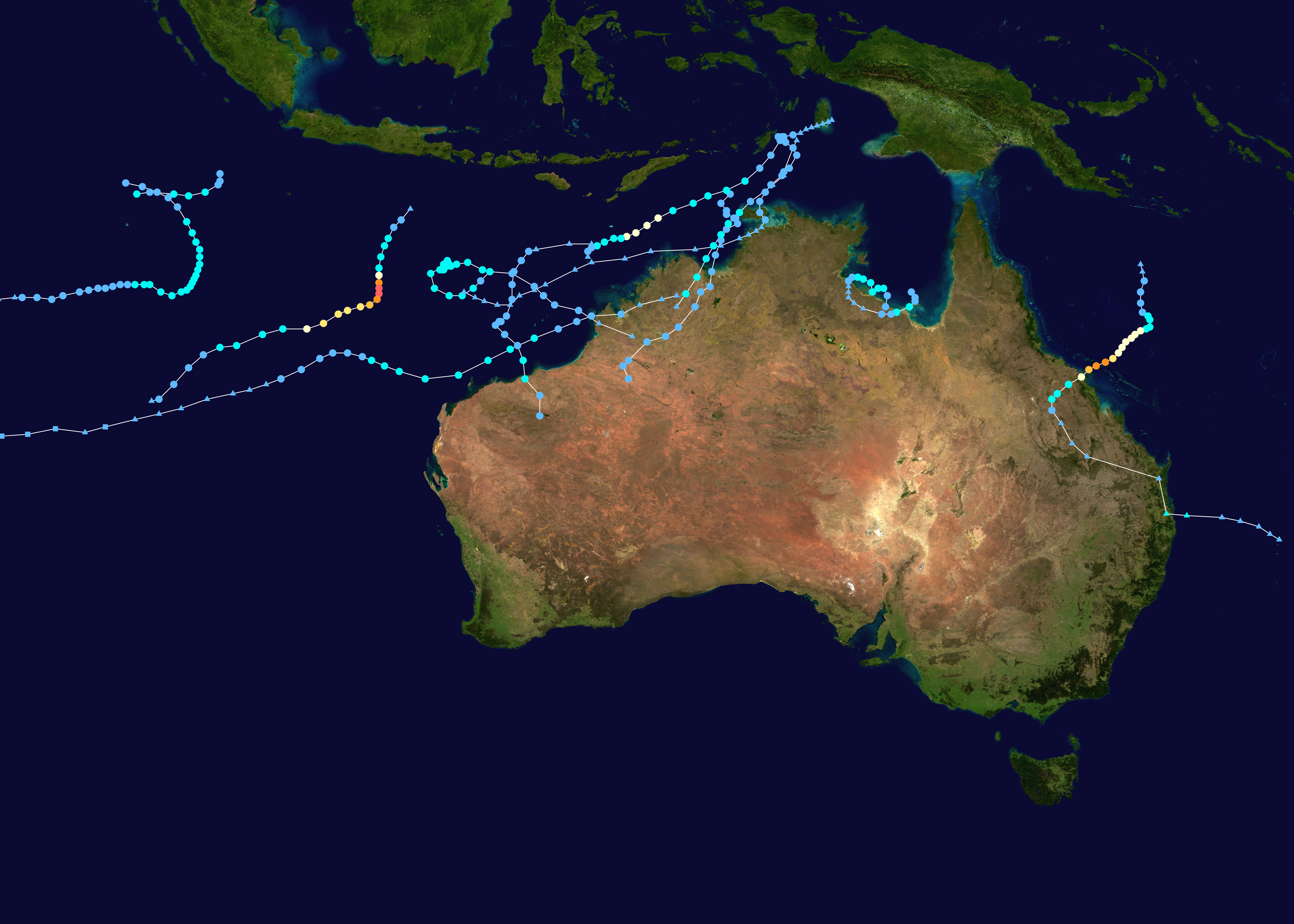
- Season summary map

Seasonal boundaries
- First system formed: 23 September 2016
- Last system dissipated: 1 May 2017

Strongest storm
- Name: Ernie
  - Maximum winds: 220 km/h (140 mph) (10-minute sustained)
  - Lowest pressure: 924 hPa (mbar)

Seasonal statistics
- Tropical lows: 30
- Tropical cyclones: 9
- Severe tropical cyclones: 3
- Total fatalities: 16 total
- Total damage: $2.82 billion (2017 USD) (Second-costliest Australian region cyclone season recorded)

Related articles
- 2016–17 South-West Indian Ocean cyclone season; 2016–17 South Pacific cyclone season

The 2016–17 Australian region cyclone season was a slightly below-average season in terms of activity, despite a very high number of tropical lows. It featured nine tropical cyclones, three of which intensified further into severe tropical cyclones; though it was much more active than the previous season. The season was the first to have a severe tropical cyclone since the 2014–15 season. It was the period of the year when most tropical cyclones form in the Southern Indian Ocean and Pacific Oceans between 90°E and 160°E. The season officially ran from 1 November 2016 to 30 April 2017, however, a tropical cyclone could form at any time between 1 July 2016 and 30 June 2017 and would count towards the season total. The first named storm, Yvette, developed during 21 December, and the final named storm, Greg, left the region on 3 May as a remnant low. This season was also the second-costliest tropical cyclone season on record in the Australian region basin, behind only the 2010–11 season, with a total of AUD$3.7 billion (US$2.82 billion) in damages incurred by the various storms, mostly from Cyclone Debbie.

During the season, tropical cyclones were officially monitored by one of the five Tropical Cyclone Warning Centres (TCWCs) that operated in this region. Three of the five centres were operated by the Australian Bureau of Meteorology (BoM) in Perth, Darwin, and Brisbane, while the other two were operated by the National Weather Service of Papua New Guinea in Port Moresby and the Indonesian Agency for Meteorology, Climatology and Geophysics in Jakarta, Indonesia. The United States' Joint Typhoon Warning Center (JTWC) and other national meteorological services, including Météo-France, also monitored the basin during the season.

== Seasonal forecasts ==
Region	Average number	Chance of more	Chance of less	Actual activity
Whole	11	67%	33%	9
Western	7	59%	41%	3
North-Western	5	63%	37%	3
Northern	3	56%	44%	3
Eastern	4	58%	42%	1
Source: BOM's Seasonal Outlooks for Tropical Cyclones.

After the least active season on record had occurred during the previous season, the BoM issued five tropical cyclone outlooks for the Australian region during October 2016. Each one of these forecasts was for the entire tropical cyclone year between July 2016 and June 2017 took into account various factors, including the latest neutral to weak La Niña conditions that had been observed in the tropical Pacific Ocean. The outlooks indicated that an above-average number of tropical cyclones were likely for the basin as a whole and the Northwestern sub-region. It was also predicted that the first tropical cyclone landfall on Australia would take place during December 2016. For the Western region between 90°E and 125°E, the BoM forecast that the area would also see activity near its average of 7, with a 59% chance of an above average number of tropical cyclones occurring. TCWC Perth also noted that there was a likelihood of two tropical cyclones and a significant likelihood of at least one severe tropical cyclone impacting Western Australia. They also noted that the number of significant cyclones and flood impacts had been well below average over the last five seasons. For the North-Western sub-region between 105°E and 130°E, it was predicted that activity would be above average, with a 63% chance of above-average tropical cyclone activity. The Northern Territory, which was defined as being between as being 125°E and 142.5°E, had a 56% chance of an above-average season. The Eastern region between 142.5°E and 160°E was predicted to have a near-normal tropical cyclone season, with a 58% chance of above-average tropical cyclone activity.

== Seasonal summary ==
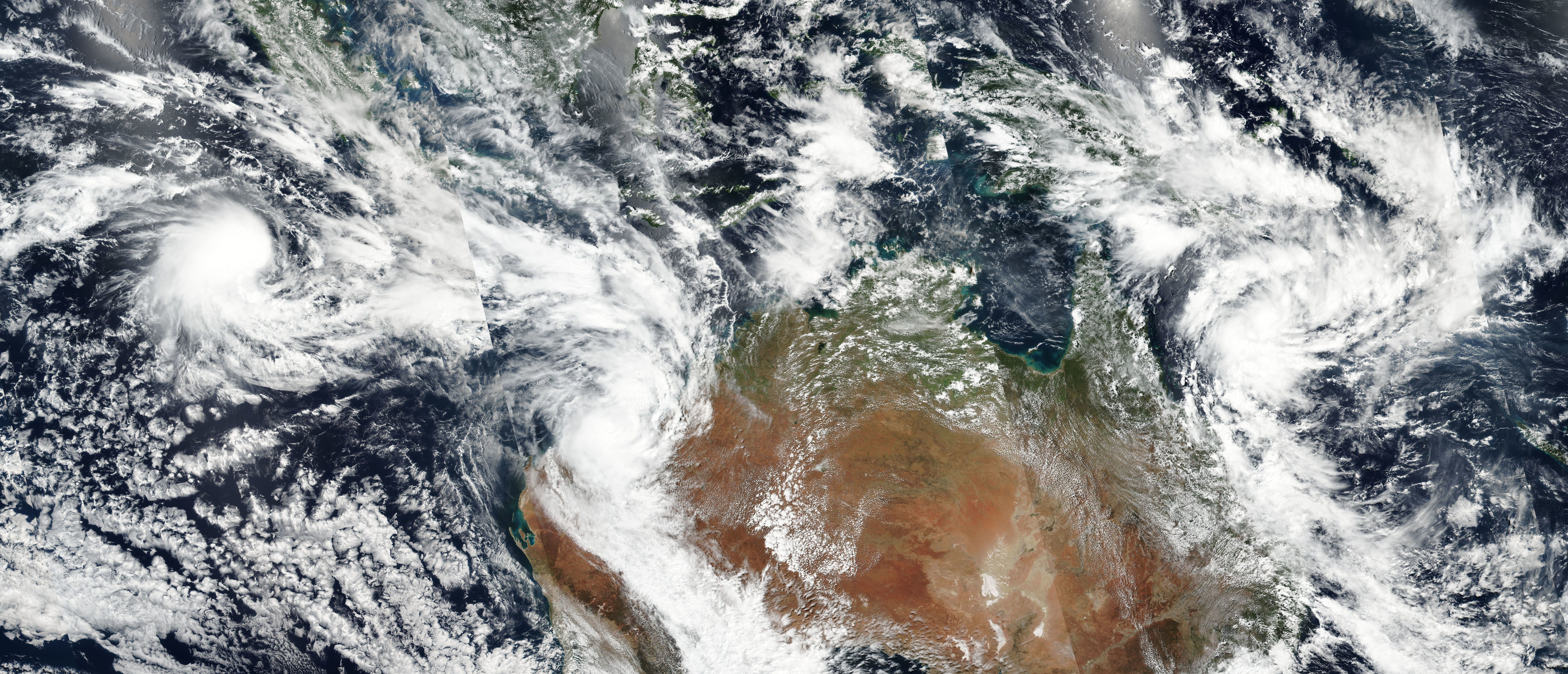
Three simultaneously active cyclones in the southern hemisphere, from left to right: Caleb, 22U, and Tropical Low 23U, which is the precursor to Cyclone Debbie.

Despite a weak season with only 8 named tropical cyclones, the BoM monitored a total of 30 tropical lows, which is the highest recorded in a season. The 2016–17 season opened with a tropical system in the Western Region on 23 September, just more than a month before the official start of the season. After three months, with the development of some tropical lows, the first named tropical cyclone, Yvette, developed on 21 December. About four-and-a-half months later, on 3 May, the season concluded when Ex-Tropical Cyclone Greg moved out of the basin.

== Systems ==
=== Tropical Low 06U ===
- Tropical low (Australian scale)
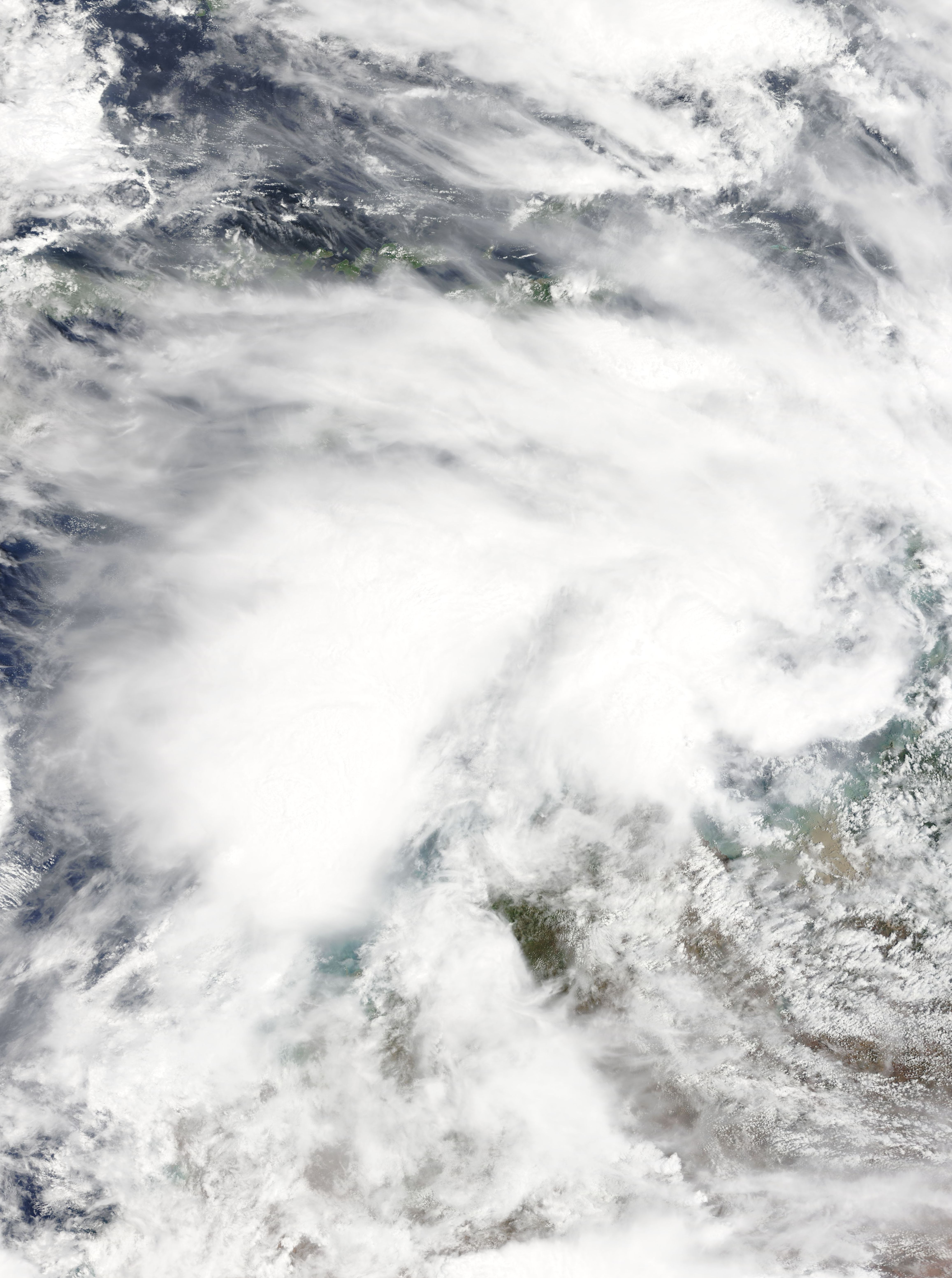
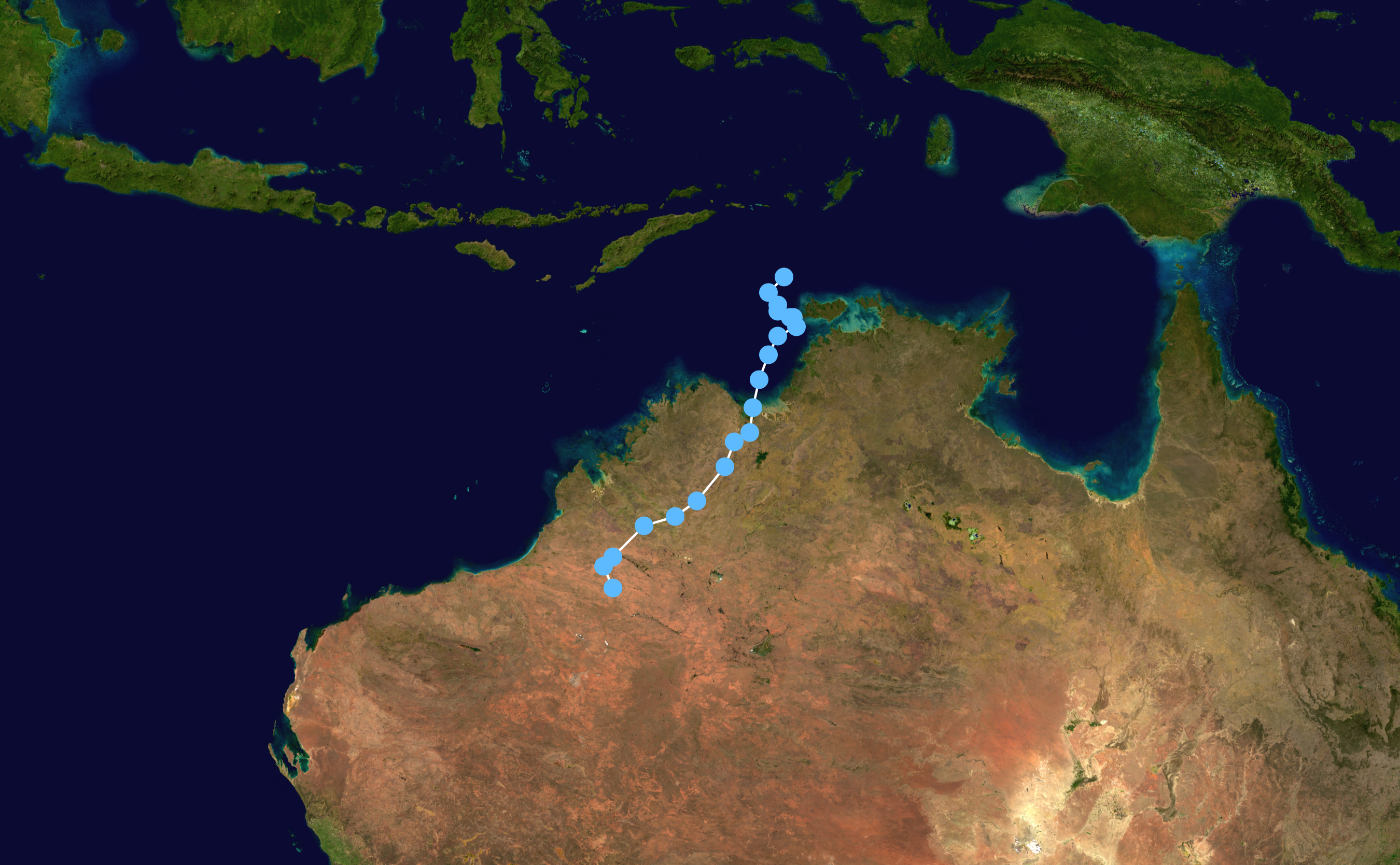
- Duration: 18 December – 23 December
- Peak intensity: 55 km/h (35 mph) (10-min); 994 hPa (mbar)

Tropical Low 06U was first noted during 18 December while it was located in the Arafura Sea, about 260 km (160 mi) to the northwest of Darwin in the Northern Territory. Over the next couple of days, the system moved south-westwards and gradually developed further as it moved into the Timor Sea, where it reached its peak intensity with 10-minute sustained winds of 55 km/h (35 mph) and a minimum pressure of 995 hPa (29.38 inHg). The system subsequently made landfall on the Kimberley and degenerated into a deep monsoonal low, remaining slow-moving over north-western Australia for several days. The low subsequently started to move southwards during 25 December, as it absorbed the remnants of Tropical Cyclone Yvette. The remnants of 06U crossed Southern Australia during 27–28 December, before being absorbed by another area of low pressure which approached 06U from southern Western Australia during 30 December. This system subsequently consolidated in the Great Australian Bight and moved south-eastwards, where it passed to the west of Tasmania before it moved into the Tasman Sea during 31 December.

=== Tropical Cyclone Yvette ===
- Category 1 tropical cyclone (Australian scale)
- Tropical storm (SSHWS)
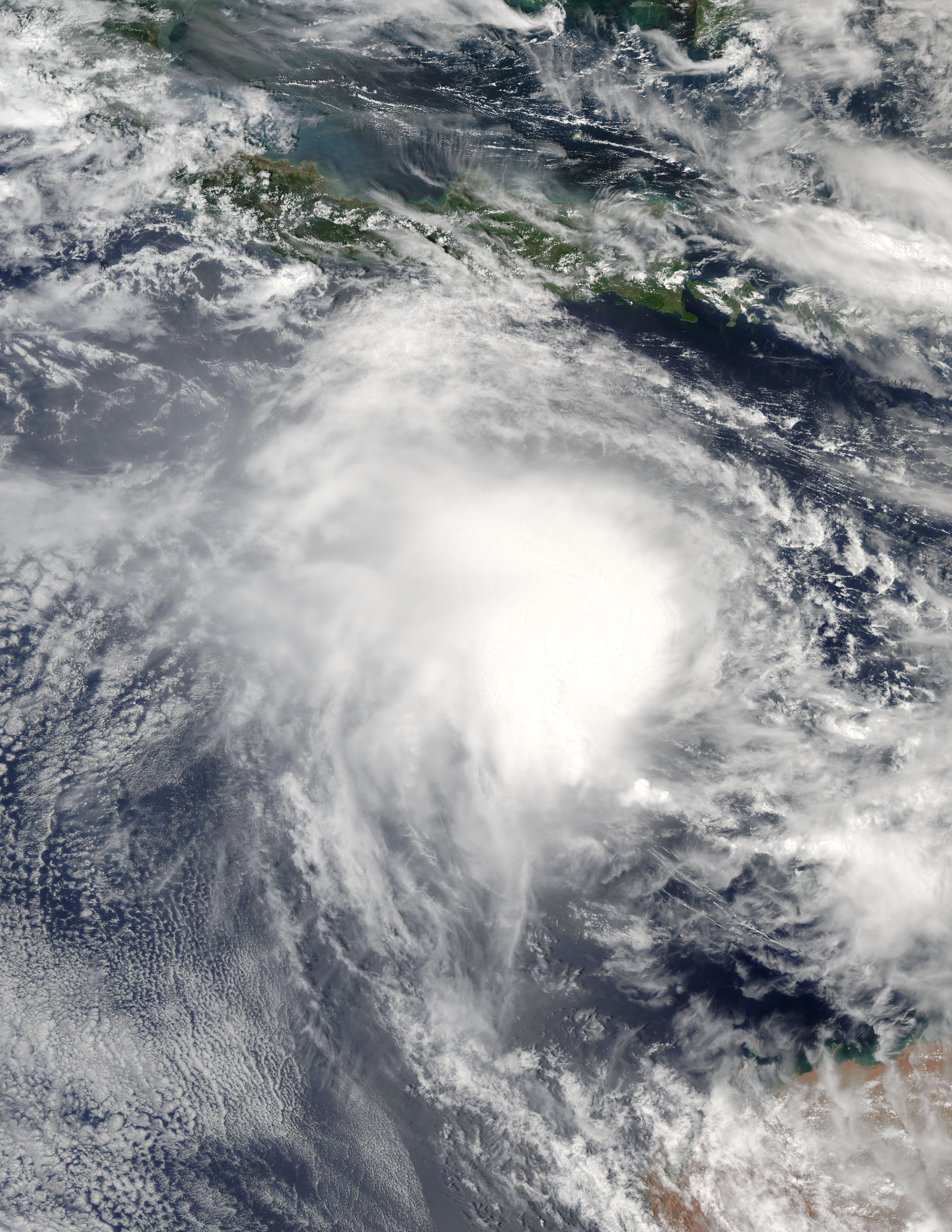
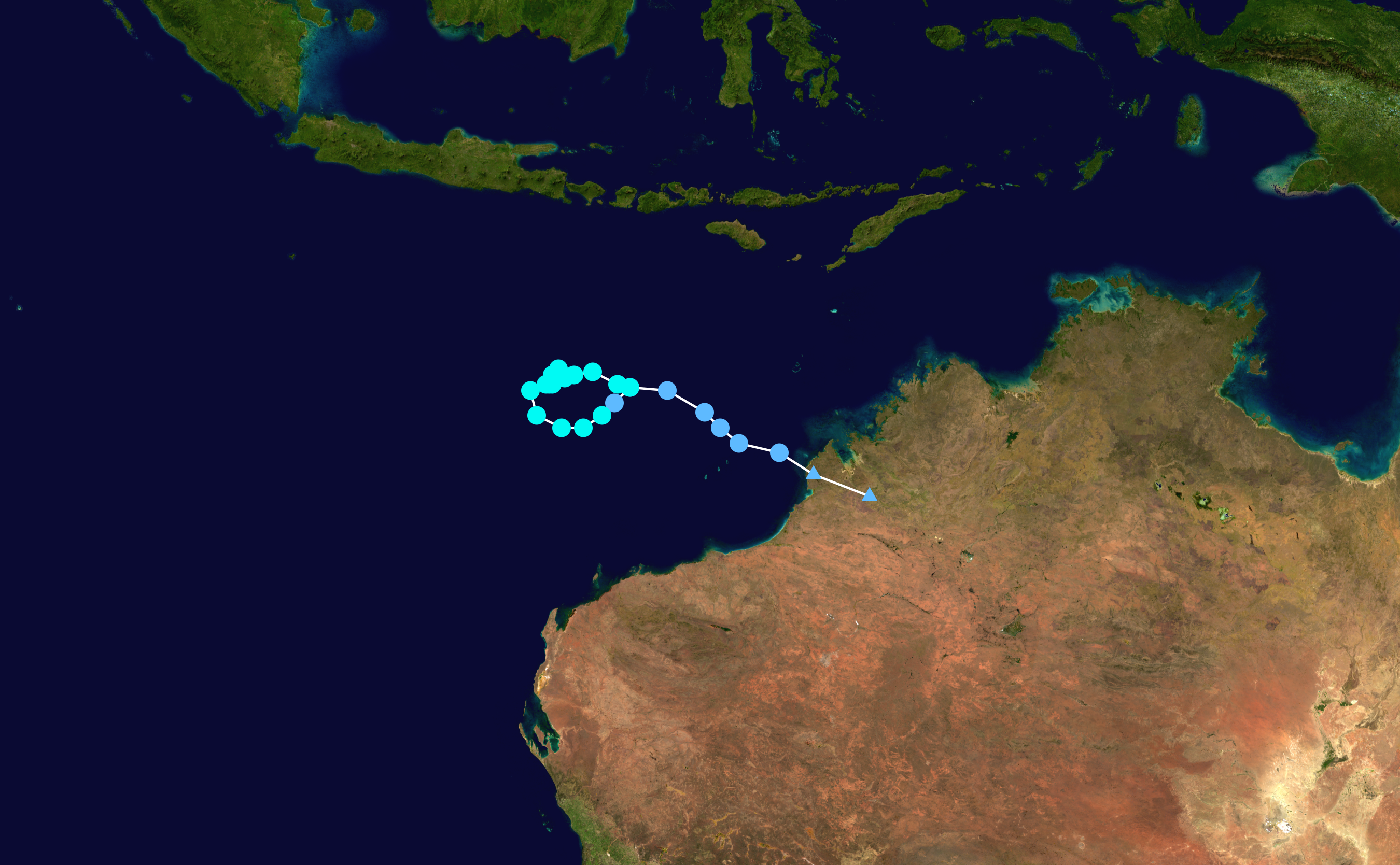
- Duration: 19 December – 25 December
- Peak intensity: 85 km/h (50 mph) (10-min); 987 hPa (mbar)

A tropical low developed during 19 December within a monsoon trough of low pressure, about 660 km (410 mi) to the north-northwest of Karratha in Western Australia and was designated as 07U. Soon after, the JTWC declared the system as a tropical storm and designated it as 02S. By 21 December, it had strengthened into a Category 1 tropical cyclone on the Australian tropical cyclone intensity scale as persistent deep convection developed, and the BoM named it Yvette. Remaining quasi-stationary under strong wind shear, convection from Yvette soon weakened; simultaneously, the storm started to move southeastwards. By 23 December, the BoM had downgraded Yvette to a tropical low as dry air began to be wrap into the centre. Later the same day, both the JTWC and the BoM issued their final bulletin on Yvette.

=== Tropical Low 09U ===
- Tropical low (Australian scale)
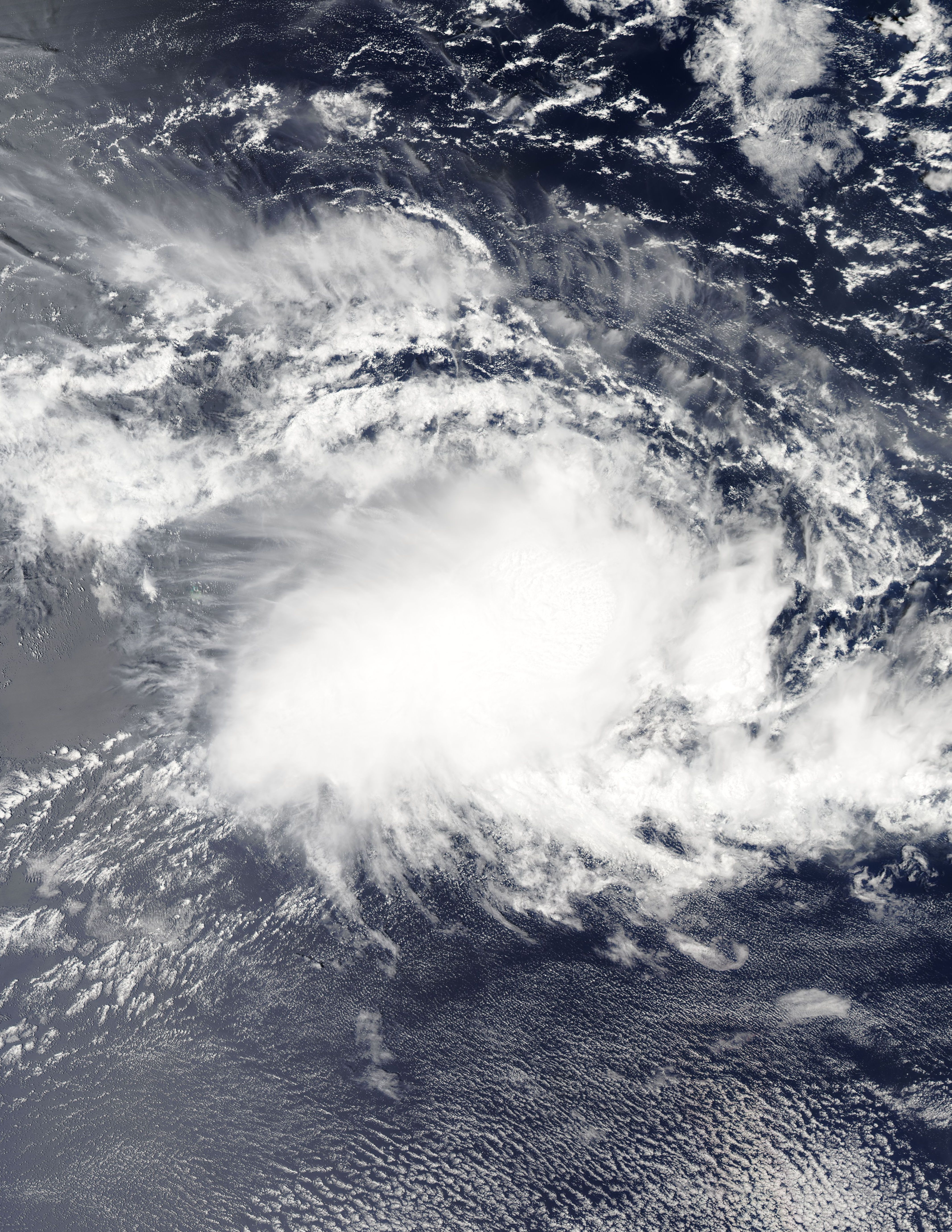
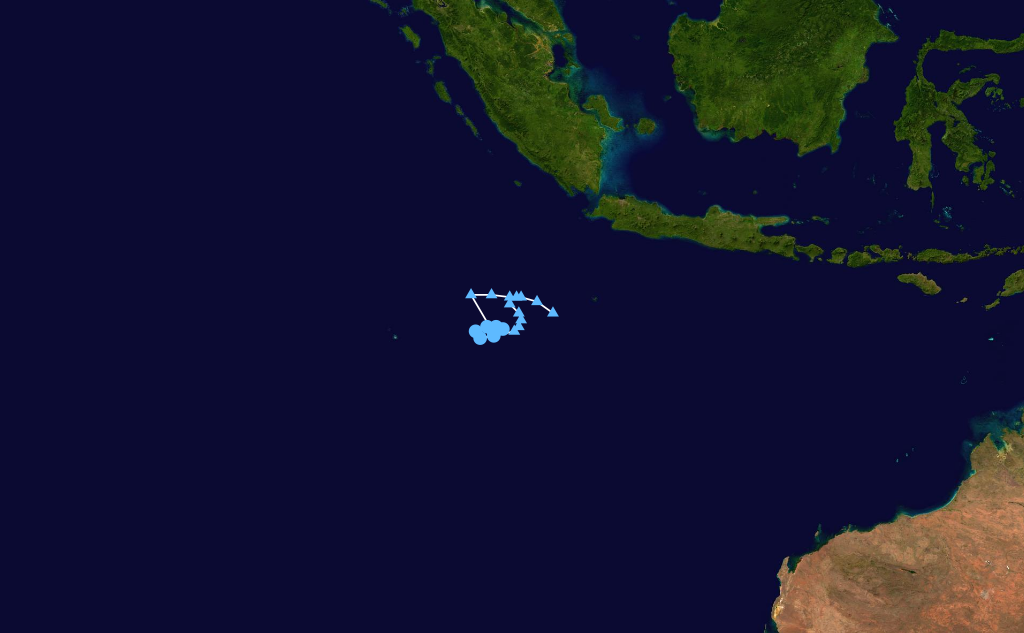
- Duration: 3 January – 15 January
- Peak intensity: Winds not specified; 1003 hPa (mbar)

On 3 January, TCWC Perth started to monitor a tropical low to the northwest of the Western Region. The tropical low meandered southwards as it was over in favourable conditions. By 9 January, the system was designated as 09U. Despite unfavourable atmospheric conditions in the area, 09U persisted, tracking slowly eastward until it was last noted early on 15 January, located about 900 km (560 mi) to the east of Christmas Island.

=== Tropical Low 10U ===
- Tropical low (Australian scale)
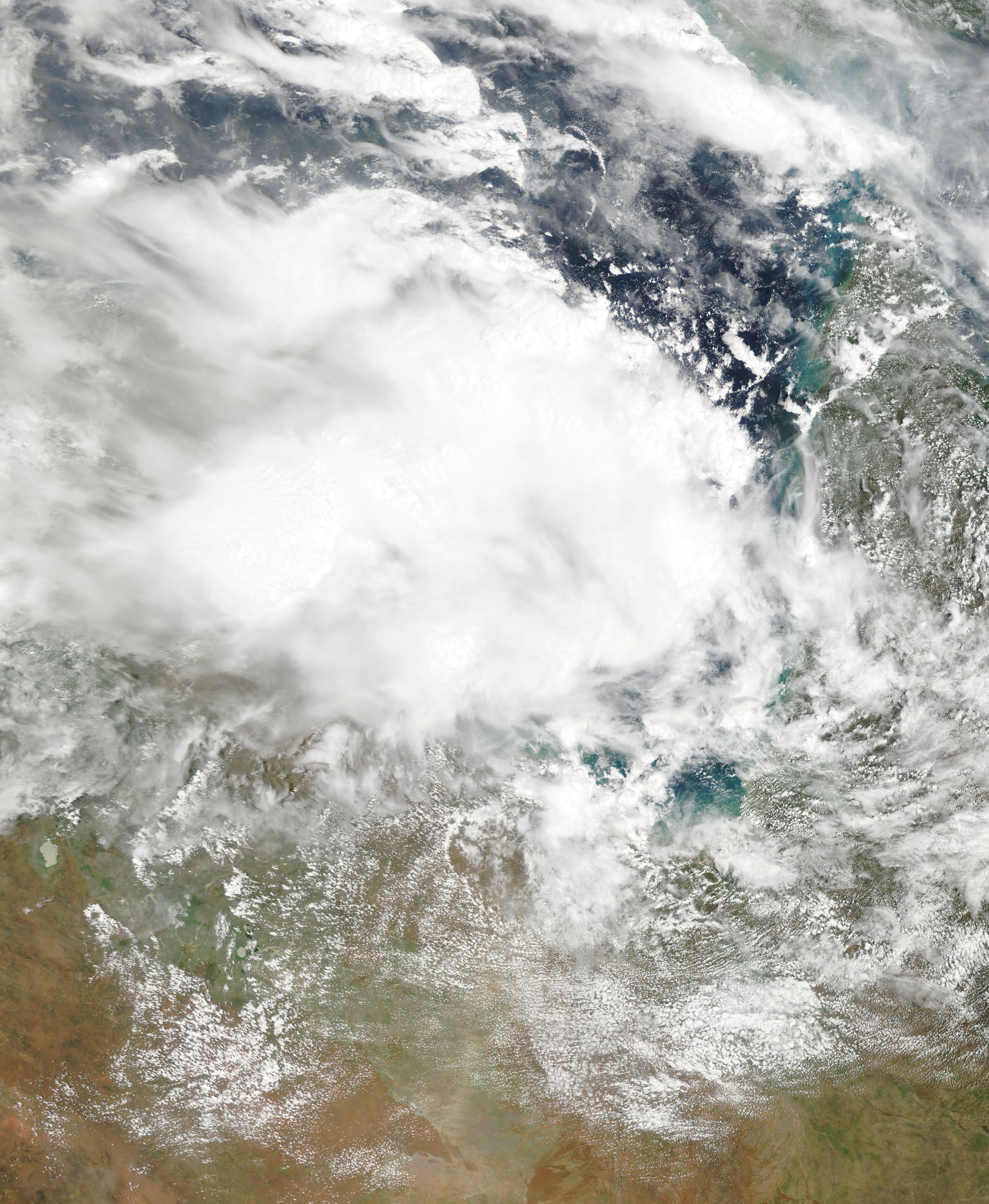
- Duration: 7 January – 12 January
- Peak intensity: Winds not specified; 1001 hPa (mbar)

On 7 January, a weak tropical low had developed within a monsoonal trough of low pressure over the Cape York Peninsula, before moving into the Gulf of Carpentaria. After eventually moving into TCWC Perth's area of responsibility by 9 January, the low was designated as 10U as it was moving over land. After moving southward over Western Australia, TCWC Perth issued its final bulletin on 12 January.

=== Tropical Low 11U ===
- Tropical low (Australian scale)
- Duration: 7 January – 8 January
- Peak intensity: Winds not specified; 1000 hPa (mbar)

On 7 January, the BoM noted that a tropical low had formed, and was called 11U. It started to intensify slowly until it reached its peak intensity at 1000 mbar. The peak was short-lived as it started to weaken gradually and was last noted on 8 January.

=== Tropical Low 14U ===
- Tropical low (Australian scale)
- Tropical storm (SSHWS)
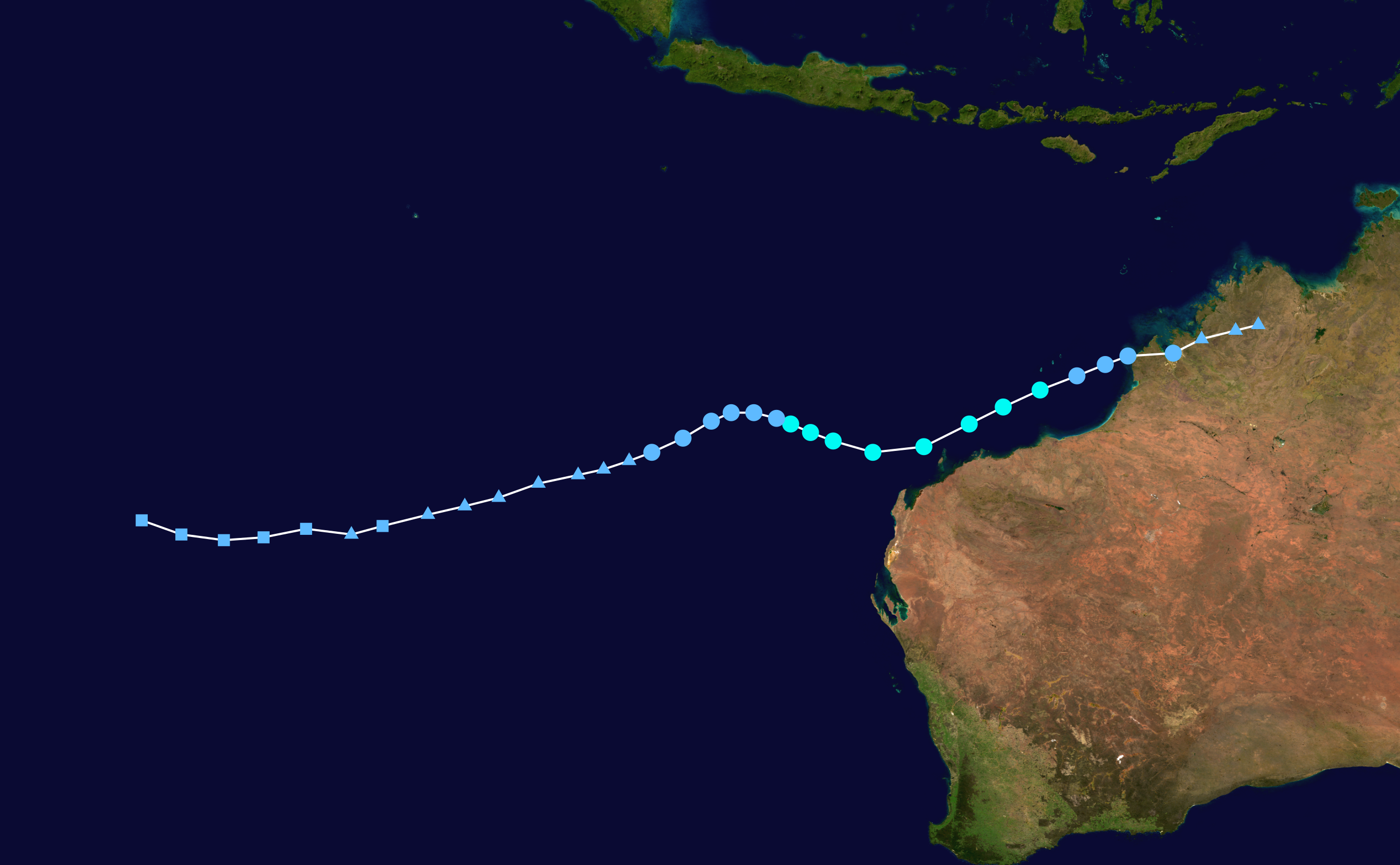
- Duration: 23 January – 31 January
- Peak intensity: 85 km/h (50 mph) (10-min); 988 hPa (mbar)

On 23 January, a tropical low developed over in the western area of the Gulf of Carpentaria. After moving west-southwestward over land, the low gradually developed and was designated as 14U during 26 January. During the next day, the JTWC began issuing advisories, classifying it as 03S as it moved over water. Slowly intensifying, 14U reached peak intensity with winds of 85 km/h (55 mph) and a minimum pressure of 988 hPa (mbar; 29.17 inHg), though the system was never classified as a tropical cyclone by BoM due to its asymmetry. Thereafter, 14U moved over cooler waters causing deep convection to dissipate, and both the JTWC and BoM issued their final advisories on 28 January.

=== Tropical Low 15U ===
- Tropical low (Australian scale)
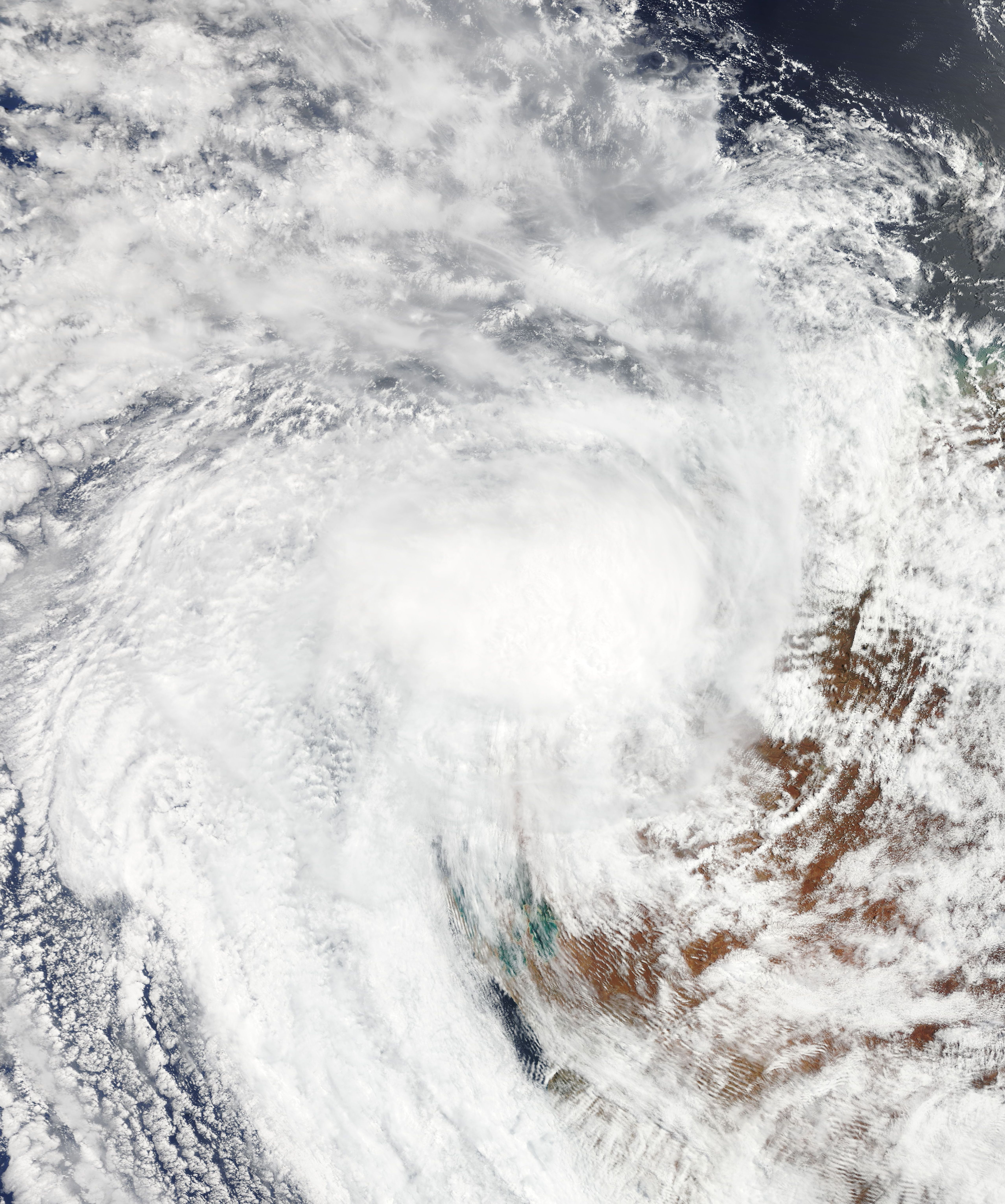
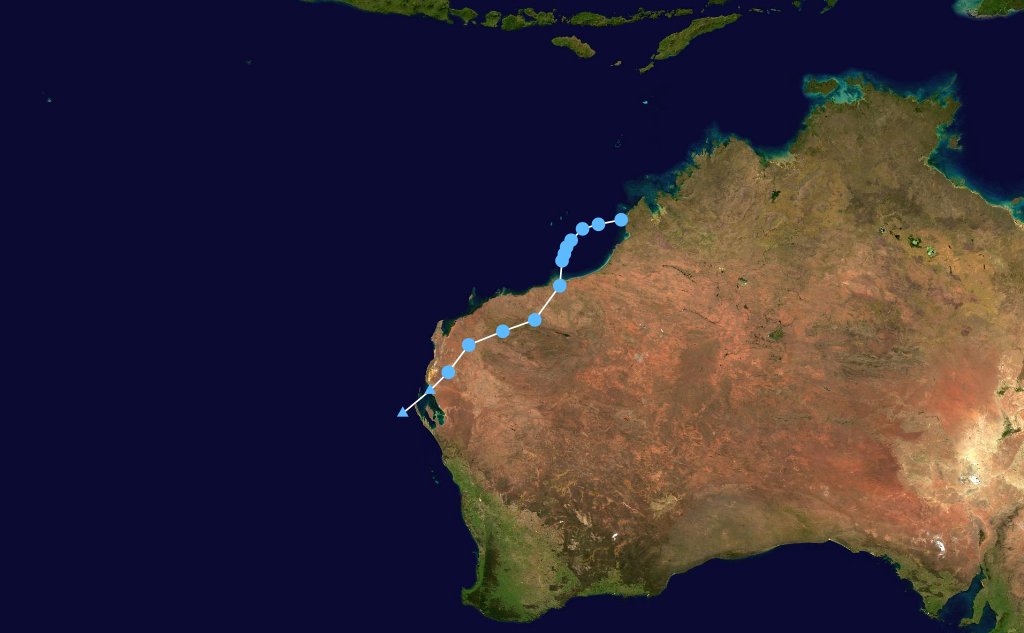
- Duration: 7 February – 11 February
- Peak intensity: Winds not specified; 984 hPa (mbar)

A tropical low formed off the Pilbara coastline near Broome on 7 February and slowly strengthened while moving westwards. The system made landfall as a low during 8 February near Karratha. The system dropped 210.8 mm (8.30 in) of rainfall on at Karratha Airport, giving it its wettest February day on record and its second-wettest day overall. The low progressively moved southwestwards over the western Pilbara and Gascoyne region before moving back offshore between Carnarvon and Shark Bay.

During the night of 9 February the low linked up with a trough lying over the southwest of the country, resulting in both abnormally low temperatures and heavy rainfall across the region, with the area within 100 km of a line from Perth to Esperance the hardest hit. The Perth metro station received 114.4 mm (4.50 in) in the 24 hours leading up to 9:00 a.m. AWST (01:00 UTC) on 10 February, the second highest 24-hour total on record for the city and over ten times its monthly average of 8.8 mm (0.35 in). Widespread flooding resulted in access to towns such as Wagin and Gnowangerup being cut off while the South Coast Highway crossing the Phillips River was washed away, resulting in no access between Jerramungup and Ravensthorpe. The Avon River experienced major flooding around Northam resulting in evacuations. The main river system in Perth, the Swan, also had flood warnings issued for the second time in as many weeks. Two people were confirmed killed in the Esperance region due to driving into floodwaters.

Despite the tropical origins of the system, the thick cloud cover over the area also resulted in records for the coldest February maximum temperatures being broken. Perth achieved a maximum temperature of just 17.4 °C (63.3 °F) on 9 February, over 14 °C below the monthly average, beating its previous record of 19.0 °C (66.2 °F) set in 1914. These temperatures were in stark contrast to the eastern states of Australia, which were experiencing a major heatwave during the same time.

=== Tropical Low 16U ===
- Tropical low (Australian scale)
- Duration: 9 February – 10 February

=== Tropical Low 17U ===
- Tropical low (Australian scale)
- Duration: 11 February – 12 February
- Peak intensity: Winds not specified; 1004 hPa (mbar)

=== Tropical Cyclone Alfred ===
- Category 2 tropical cyclone (Australian scale)
- Tropical storm (SSHWS)
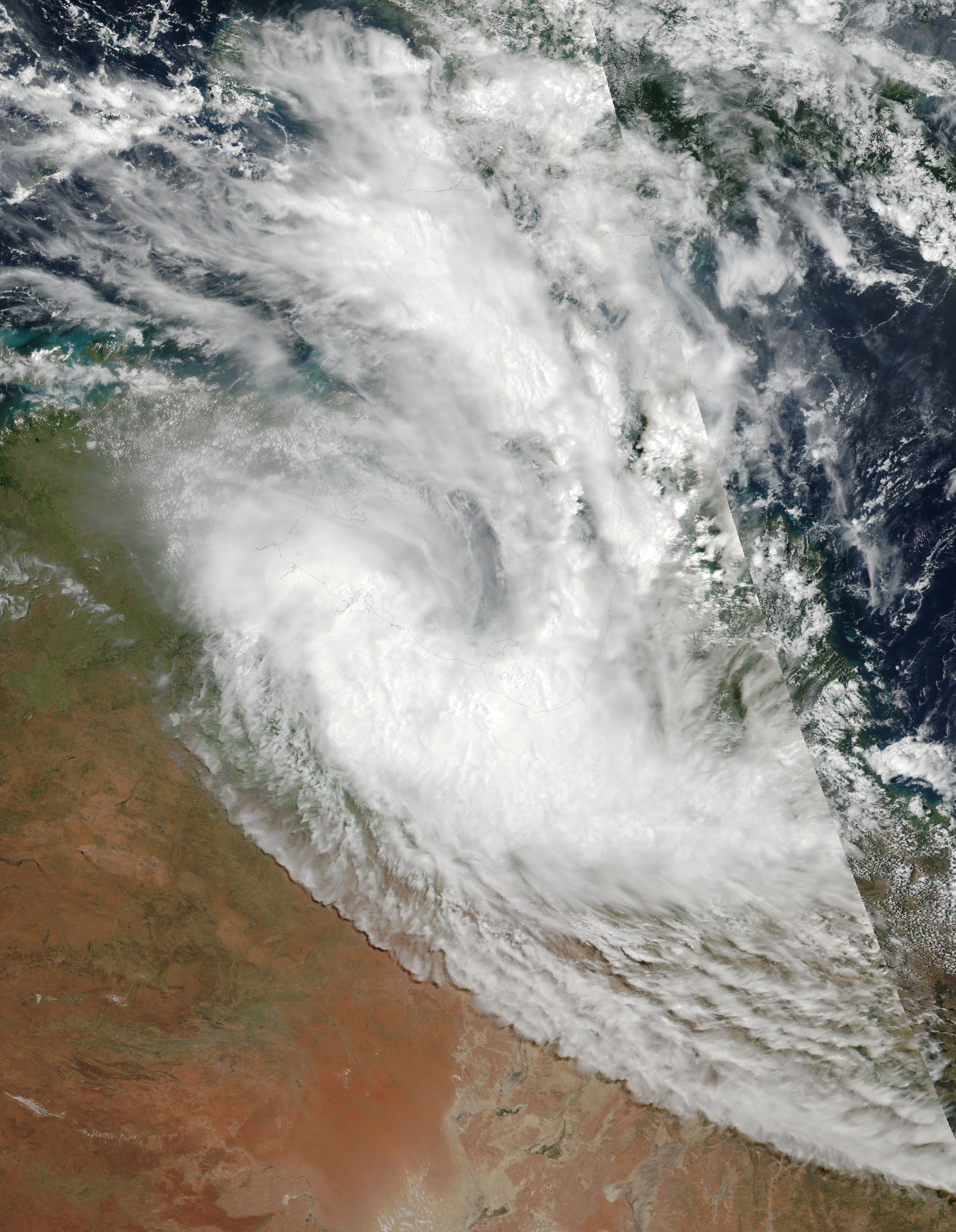
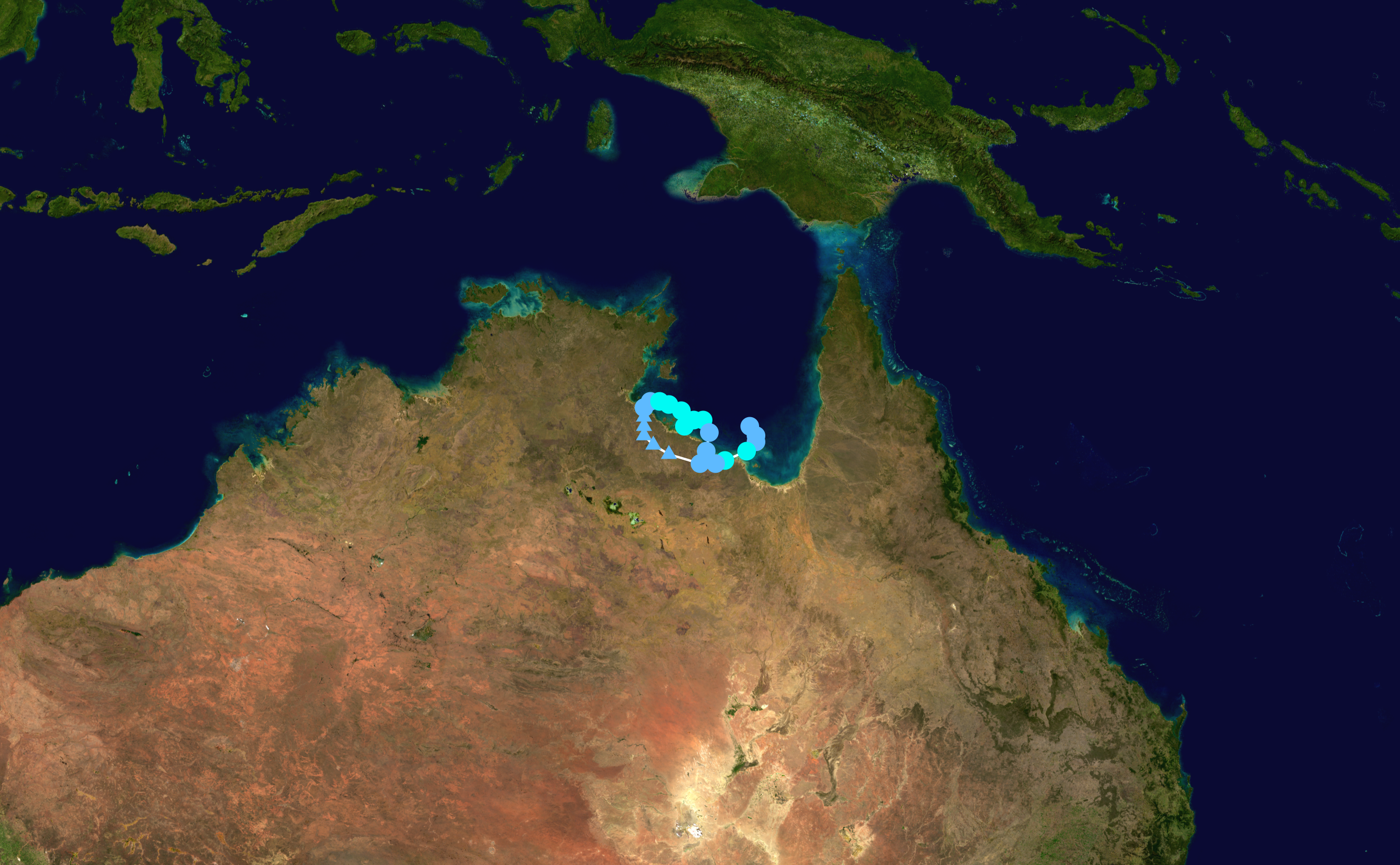
- Duration: 16 February – 22 February
- Peak intensity: 95 km/h (60 mph) (10-min); 987 hPa (mbar)

On the night of 15 February, a tropical low had formed near Borroloola. The tropical low remained slow-moving near the southern Gulf of Carpentaria coast for a number of days before moving over open waters on 19 February. The tropical low gradually intensified while moving north towards Groote Eylandt before turning back towards the southeast. The low intensified into a Category 1 tropical cyclone on the Australian cyclone intensity scale on the morning of 20 February, and was named Alfred. Alfred remained a Category 1 tropical cyclone for almost 24 hours before weakening below cyclone strength, just before crossing the coast of the Gulf of Carpentaria, in the early afternoon of 21 February. The system dissipated on the next day. Alfred was the first tropical cyclone to hit the Northern Territory since Cyclone Nathan in 2015.

=== Tropical Cyclone Blanche ===
- Category 2 tropical cyclone (Australian scale)
- Tropical storm (SSHWS)
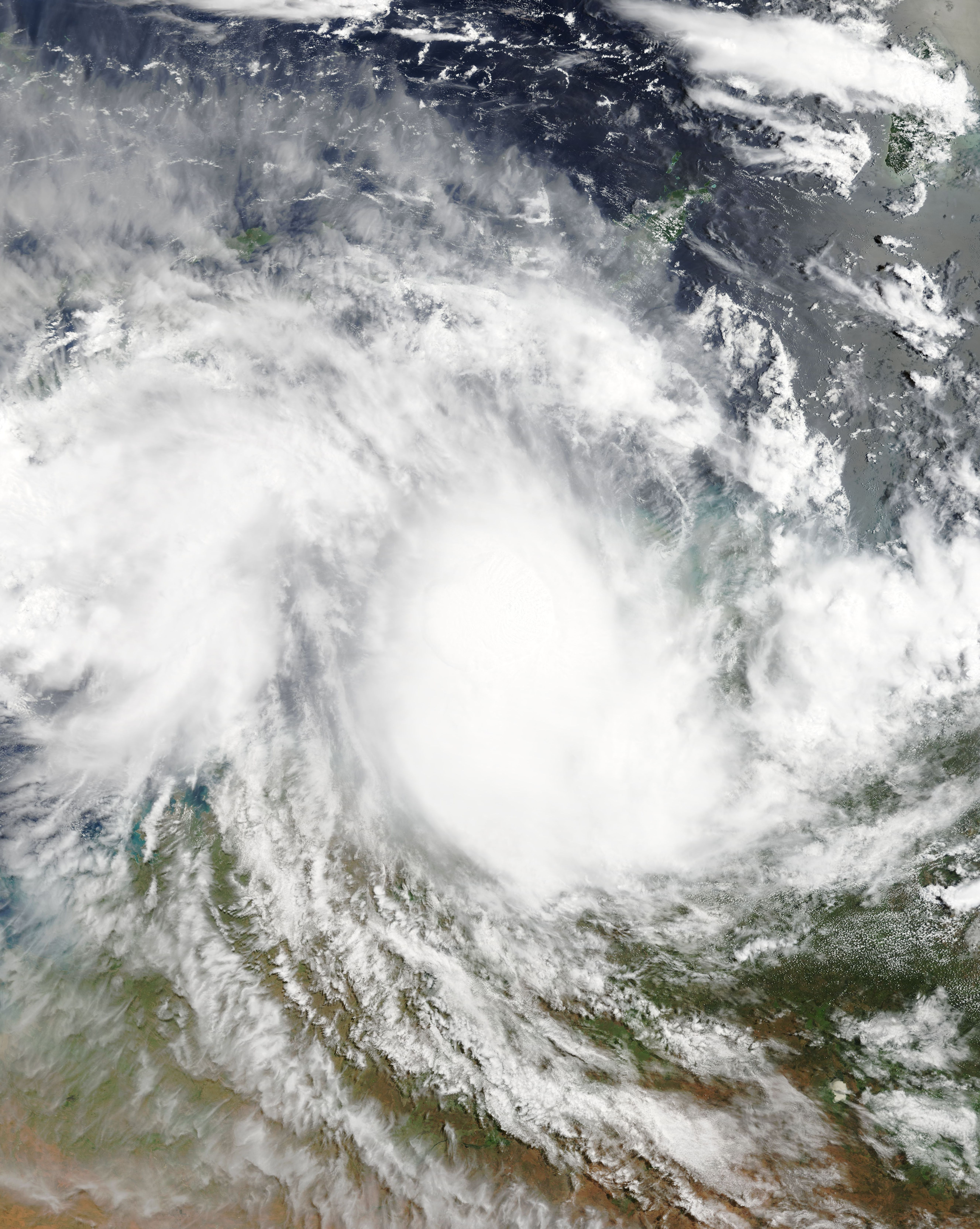
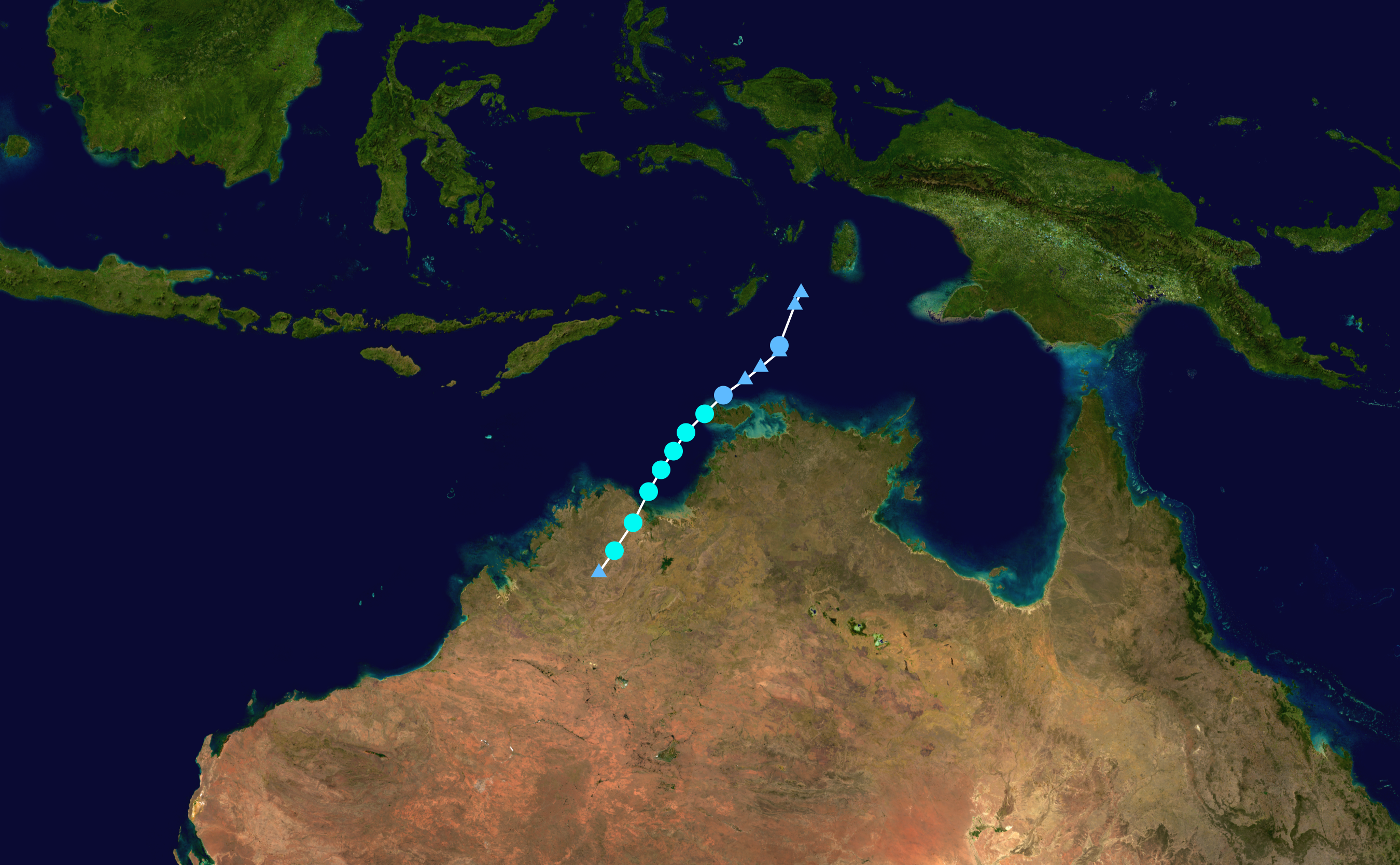
- Duration: 1 March – 7 March
- Peak intensity: 100 km/h (65 mph) (10-min); 984 hPa (mbar)

Early on 2 March, TCWC Darwin noted a developing tropical low in the north Arafura Sea, followed promptly by the JTWC that afternoon. TCWC Darwin began issuing advisories on the tropical low at 00:00 UTC on 4 March. Embedded within a moderate to high wind shear regime, the system was expected to track south or southwest into a more favourable environment over subsequent days. By 00:00 UTC on 5 March, the low had moved underneath an anticyclone, providing excellent outflow which offset the negative effects from continued wind shear. In accordance with satellite intensity estimates, the TCWC Darwin upgraded the low to Tropical Cyclone Blanche.

With increasing deep convection and a more consolidated centre of circulation, the JTWC issued a Tropical Cyclone Formation Alert at 02:00 UTC on 5 March, and designated the system as Tropical Cyclone 10S shortly thereafter at 15:00 UTC. At 00:00 UTC on 6 March, TCWC Darwin upgraded Blanche to a Category 2 cyclone on the Australian tropical cyclone intensity scale, with 10-minute sustained winds of 95 km/h (60 mph) and a minimum barometric pressure of 988 hPa (29.18 inHg); this marked the cyclone's official peak intensity. The JTWC, meanwhile, assessed a peak with 1-minute sustained winds of 95 km/h (60 mph). Around 03:00 UTC that day, Blanche moved ashore a largely uninhabited region of western Australia, the latest instance of the country's first tropical cyclone landfall for any season on record. Once inland, the cyclone began to weaken as its mid-level circulation became dislocated from its low-level circulation, and as dry air became more prevalent. Land observations indicated that the system weakened below tropical cyclone intensity by 09:00 UTC.

Prior to becoming a tropical cyclone, the precursor tropical low to Blanche led to a 24-hour record-breaking 384 mm (15.1 in) of rainfall on Point Fawcett in the Tiwi Islands, surpassing the previous record of 265.2 mm (10.44 in) set by Cyclone Carlos in 2011. Strong wind gusts of up to 95 km/h (60 mph) were recorded as well. Although expected to steer clear of the Coral Sea, some experts hoped that widespread cloudiness from the developing system would result in cooler ocean temperatures across the region, negating an ongoing coral bleaching event in the Great Barrier Reef. Passing close but ultimately west of Darwin, officials opened three public shelters and urged citizens to shelter in place as conditions deteriorated. The Darwin River Dam spillway was topped to ease potential flooding, and additional staff were allocated at local hospitals. The city recorded substantial rainfall of 145 mm (5.7 in) within a 24-hour period. On 5 March, the Department of Fire and Emergency Services issued a "blue alert" stretching from the Western Australia–Northern Territory border to Kuri Bay in the Kimberley, while a "yellow alert" was hoisted from Wyndham to Kalumburu as Blanche neared the coastline of Western Australia. Upon landfall, Channel Point was hardest hit, with rainfall peaking at 145 mm (5.7 in). Roadways were shut down due to street flooding. East Kimberly Regional Airport recorded 45.8 millimetres (1.80 in) while nearby Wyndham documented 38.8 mm (1.53 in).

=== Tropical Low 21U ===
- Tropical low (Australian scale)
- Duration: 14 March – 18 March

=== Tropical Cyclone 22U ===
- Category 2 tropical cyclone (Australian scale)
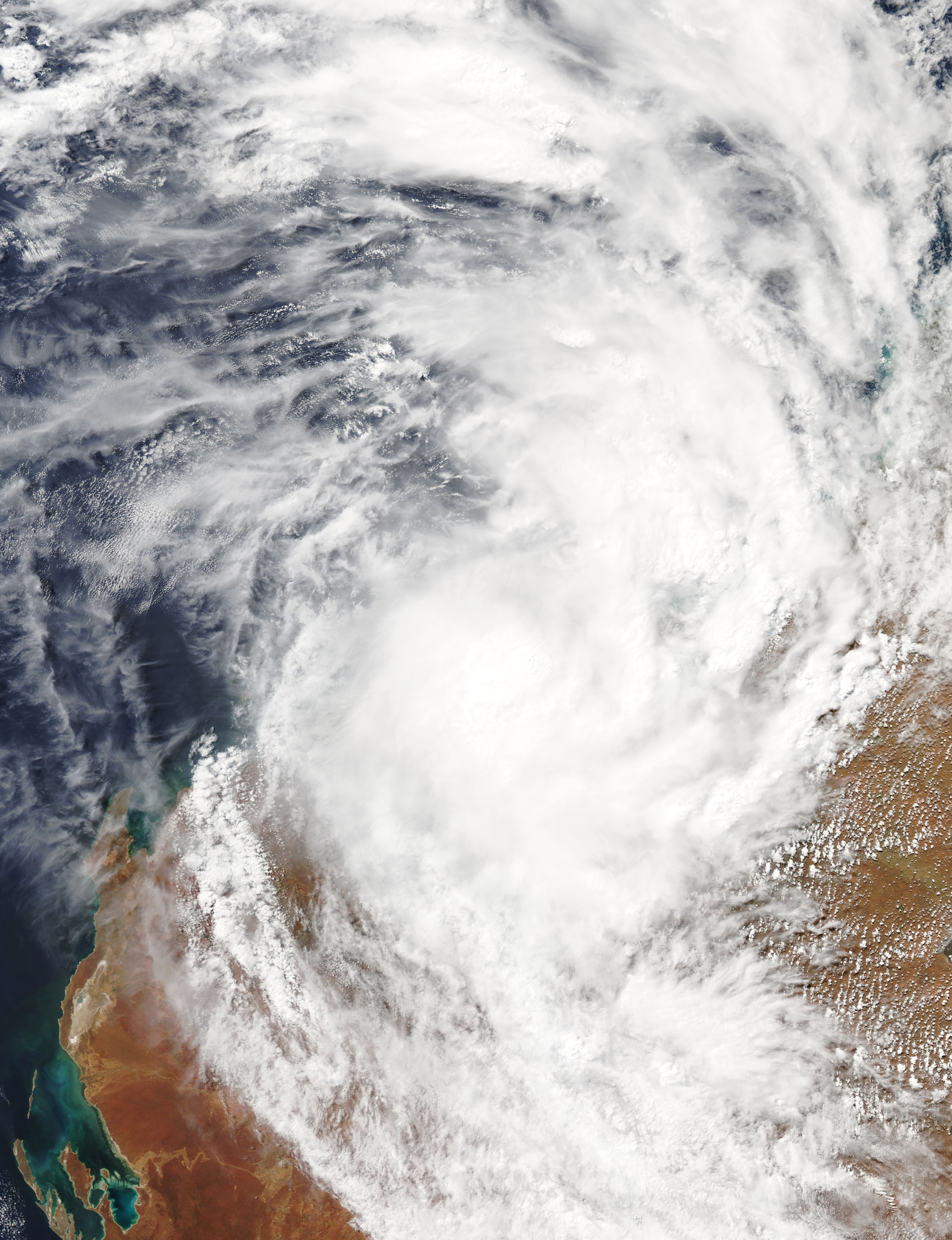
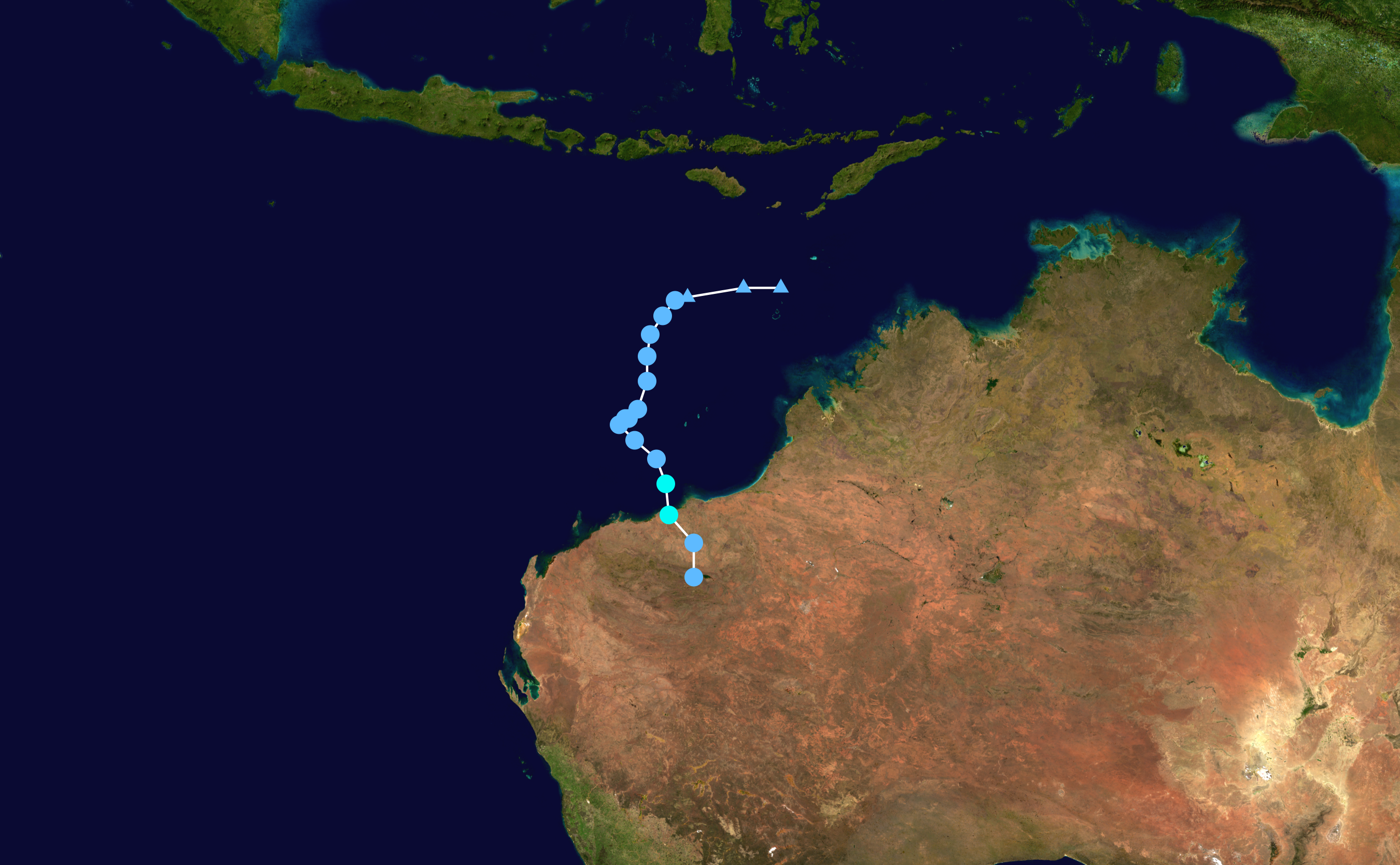
- Duration: 20 March – 24 March
- Peak intensity: 95 km/h (60 mph) (10-min); 985 hPa (mbar)

On 21 March, TCWC Perth began monitoring and issuing warnings for a developing tropical low in the Indian Ocean off the Pilbara coast. At about 06:00 UTC on the same day, the system was located approximately 590 km (370 mi) north-northwest of Port Hedland and 600 km (370 mi) north of Karratha, and was tracking to the southwest at approximately 7 km/h (4.3 mph). At the same time, the tropical low's maximum 10-minute sustained winds were estimated at 30 km/h (20 mph), gusting to 85 km/h (55 mph). The system was forecast to have a moderate chance of reaching Category 1 strength on the Australian tropical cyclone intensity scale on the afternoon of 23 March, prior to landfall. At around 18:00 UTC on 21 March, the Bureau of Meteorology issued another forecast track map for Tropical Low 22U, which predicted the system to make landfall near Sherlock Station, halfway between Whim Creek and Roebourne, on the night of 23 March, at the initially predicted intensity of Category 1. Post analysis determined that the system briefly reached tropical cyclone intensity just before making landfall. Port Hedland Airport recorded a period of gale-force winds with a peak wind gust of 94 km/h.

=== Tropical Cyclone Caleb ===
- Category 1 tropical cyclone (Australian scale)
- Tropical storm (SSHWS)
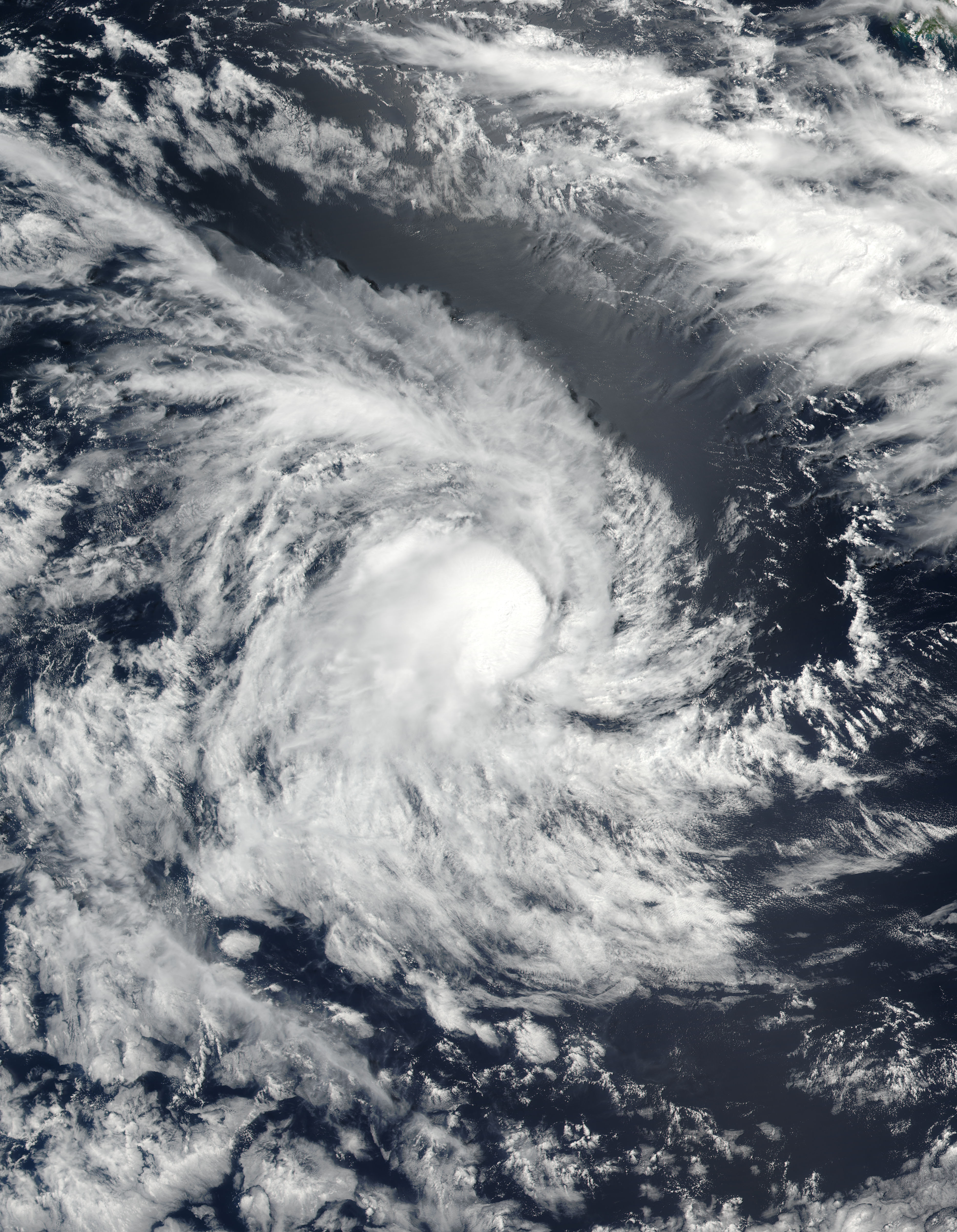
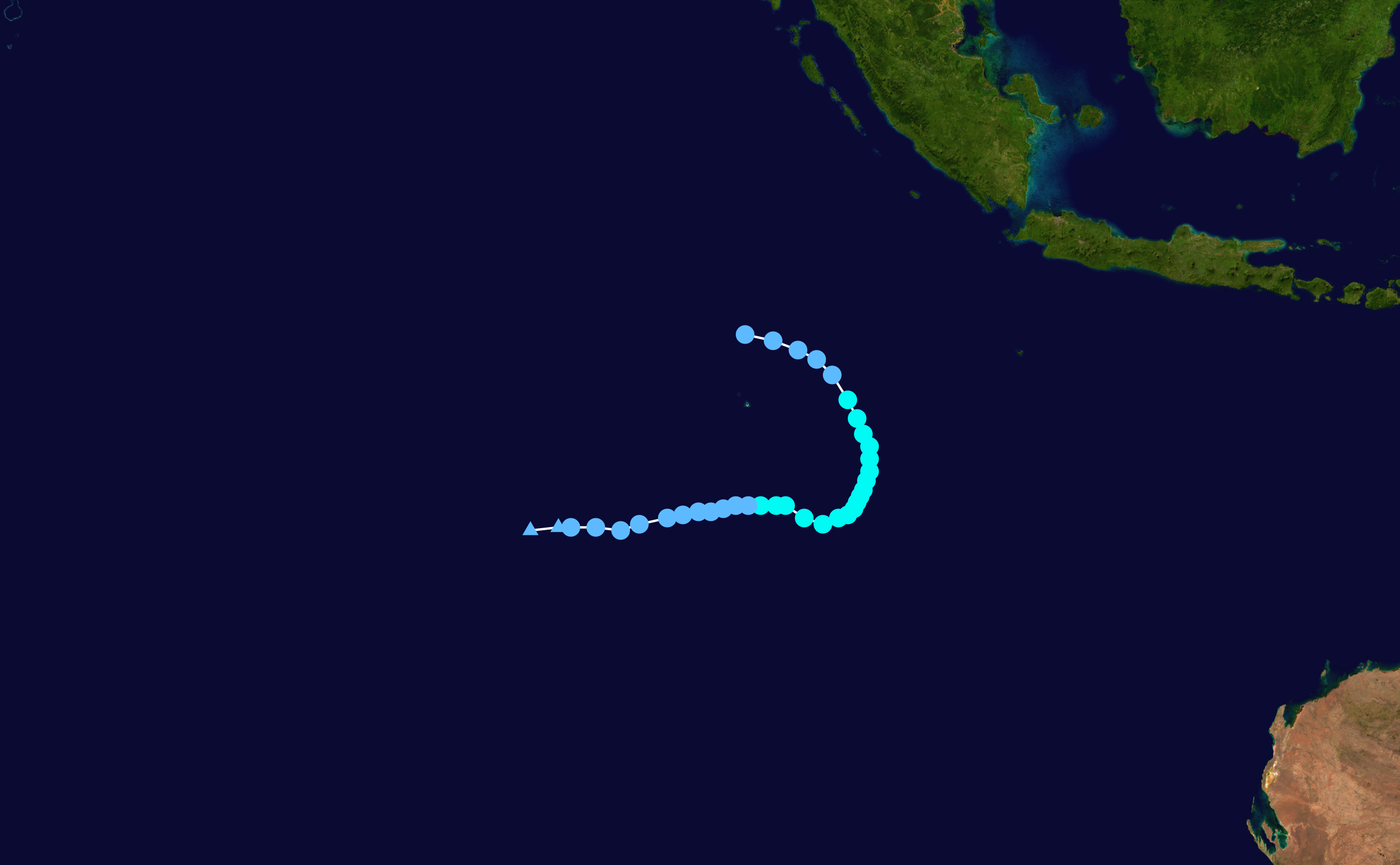
- Duration: 23 March – 27 March
- Peak intensity: 85 km/h (50 mph) (10-min); 989 hPa (mbar)

Early on 23 March, a tropical low in a monsoon trough developed approximately 240 km (150 mi) north of the Cocos Islands. The low proceeded to move in a southeasterly direction. During 24 March, gales had developed around the system, and it was classified as a Category 1 tropical cyclone on the Australian cyclone intensity scale at 06:00 UTC on the same day. Caleb developed slowly over the next 48 hours as it drifted towards the south. By early 27 March, Caleb had weakened below cyclone strength due to a combination of dry air and cooler sea surface temperatures.

=== Severe Tropical Cyclone Debbie ===
- Category 4 severe tropical cyclone (Australian scale)
- Category 4 tropical cyclone (SSHWS)
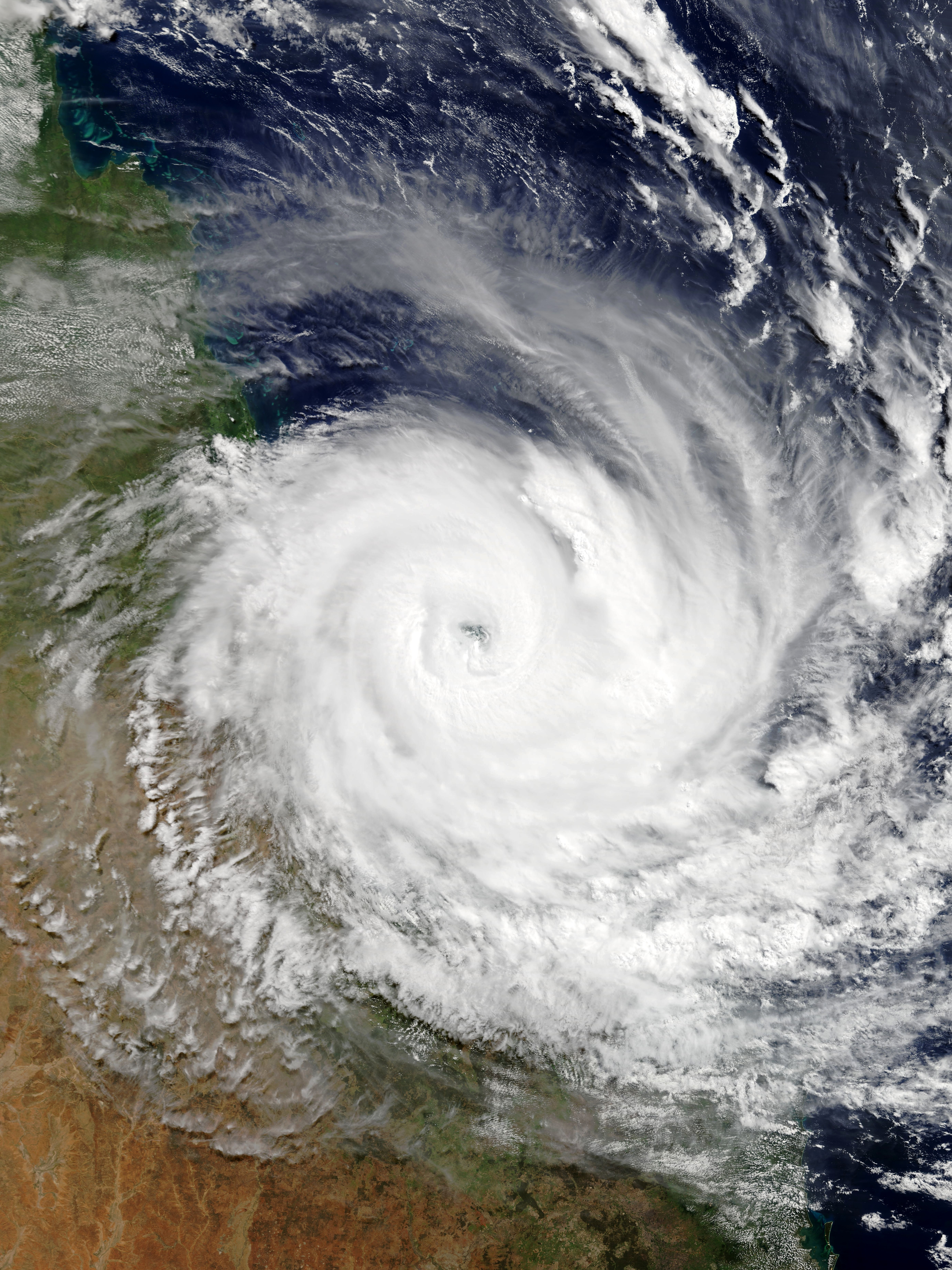
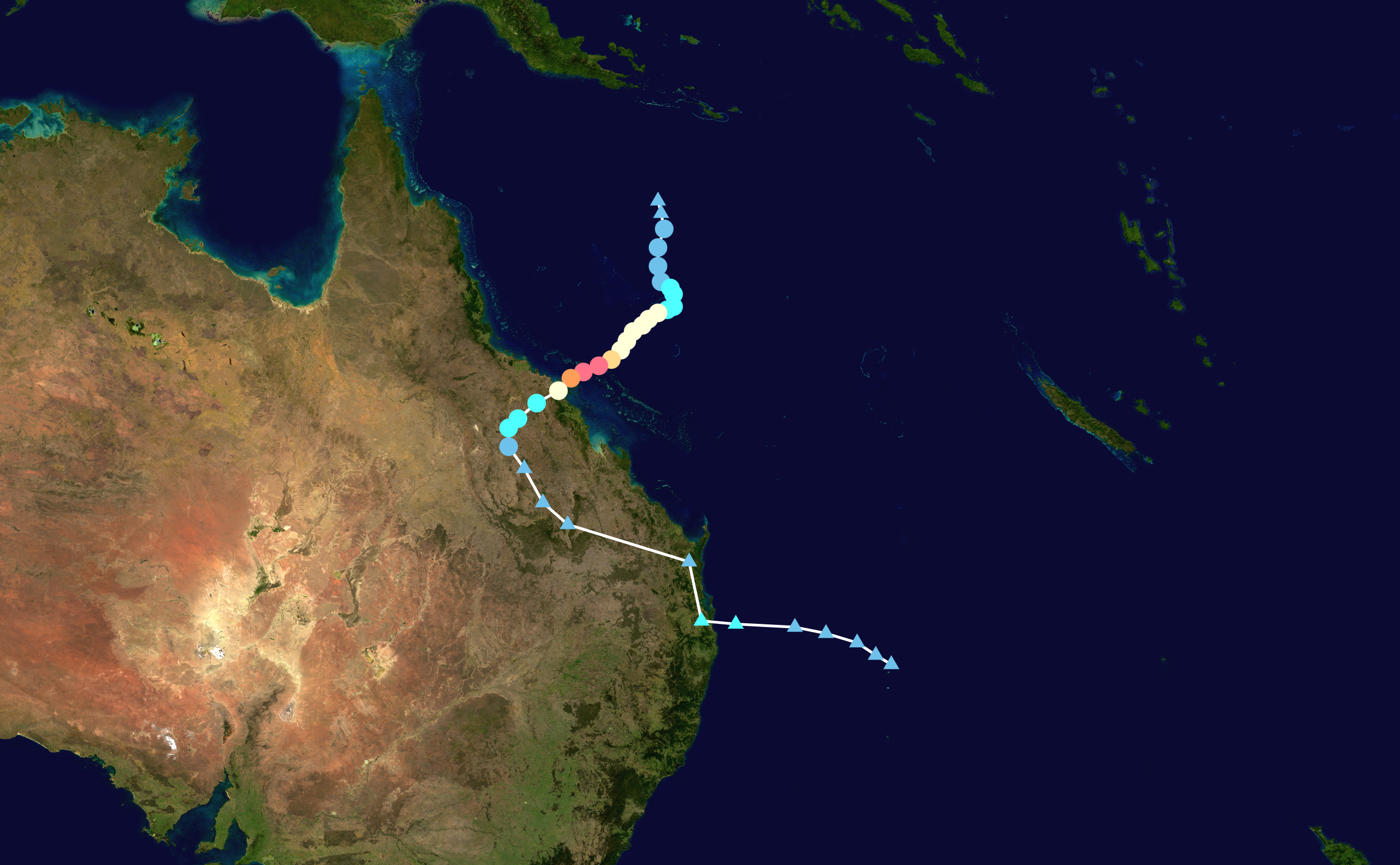
- Duration: 23 March – 30 March
- Peak intensity: 175 km/h (110 mph) (10-min); 949 hPa (mbar)

On 22 March, a weak but well-defined area of low pressure developed over the Coral Sea, near the Louisiade Archipelago of Papua New Guinea. On the next day, the BoM classified the system as a tropical low. The system intensified into a Category 1 tropical cyclone on the Australian tropical cyclone intensity scale at 00:00 UTC on 25 March, and was subsequently named Debbie. Assuming a course to the southwest, the system developed into a Category 2 cyclone by 12:00 UTC on 25 March, and maintained this strength until the early morning of 27 March (local time) due to less favourable conditions for intensification. As favourable atmospheric conditions returned, Debbie underwent a period of rapid intensification, strengthening to a Category 4 severe tropical cyclone in 12 hours. The system drew nearer to the coast during the morning of 28 March, and during this time a wind gust of 263 km/h (163 mph) was recorded on Hamilton Island. Debbie made landfall on the Queensland coast near Airlie Beach at 02:40 UTC on 28 March as a strong Category 4 system. At the same time, the cyclone's already slow speed reduced to 7 km/h (4.3 mph), causing nearby towns to be subjected to extremely strong winds for many hours. The system weakened steadily as it moved inland, falling to Category 3 by 06:00 UTC while located near Proserpine, Category 2 while near Collinsville a few hours afterwards, and Category 1 by 16:00 UTC. The system was downgraded to a tropical low at about 17:00 UTC, and began to accelerate while making a gradual transition to a southeasterly course. Ex-Tropical Cyclone Debbie moved into the Pacific Ocean on the night of Thursday 30 March (local time).

Ex-Tropical Cyclone Debbie caused widespread damage, especially due to extremely high rainfall totals, as it tracked down the Queensland coast. In the Mackay region, the system brought 635 mm (25.0 in) of rainfall to Mt Jukes in 24 hours, and 986 mm (38.8 in) to Clarke Range in 48 hours. The torrential rainfall in the region caused the overflowing of the Pioneer River, and the subsequent need for nearly 100 people to be rescued from floodwaters in western Mackay. South of Mackay, the Plane Creek Sugar Mill in Sarina recorded at least 1,300 mm (51 in) of rainfall. As the low-pressure system continued to move down the coast, the Fitzroy River region experienced 48-hour rainfall totals exceeding 1,000 mm (39 in) in many places. The river later peaked at 8.8 m (29 ft), flooding hundreds of properties in the Rockhampton area. Ex-Tropical Cyclone Debbie moved into the South East Queensland region on the afternoon of 30 March, and caused widespread rainfall of 150 mm (5.9 in) and wind gusts of up to 131 km/h (81 mph). These rainfall totals were accompanied by significant falls exceeding 200 mm (7.9 in) south of Brisbane, in the Gold Coast Hinterland and Scenic Rim. Of note, Springbrook received nearly 900 mm (35 in) of rain, including 602 mm (23.7 in) in a 24-hour period. Severe flooding also occurred in the Logan, Albert and Tweed Rivers, inundating Logan and parts of northern New South Wales, such as Murwillumbah and Lismore. As a result of the deluge in South East Queensland, more than half of the region's dams were left above capacity. Overall, Ex-Tropical Cyclone Debbie broke rainfall records at 62 weather stations in Queensland.

Throughout its lifetime, Severe Tropical Cyclone Debbie claimed the lives of 14 people in Queensland and New South Wales. The majority of these fatalities resulted from the remnant low-pressure system rather than the cyclone itself. Total economic losses from the cyclone reached A$3.5 billion (US$2.67 billion USD). This figure surpassed the initial prediction of A$2 billion (US$1.55 billion), which incorporated an estimated $1.5 billion loss in coal exports, $270 million in damage to crops such as sugar cane, a $120–280 million impact on tourism in the Whitsunday region, and physical damage to both public and private property. In total, more than 72,000 calls for assistance were made after the cyclone, which is more than were made after Severe Tropical Cyclone Yasi in 2011. As a result of the widespread and devastating impacts of Severe Tropical Cyclone Debbie, the Bureau of Meteorology officially retired the name Debbie from its naming list.

=== Severe Tropical Cyclone Ernie ===
- Category 5 severe tropical cyclone (Australian scale)
- Category 5 tropical cyclone (SSHWS)
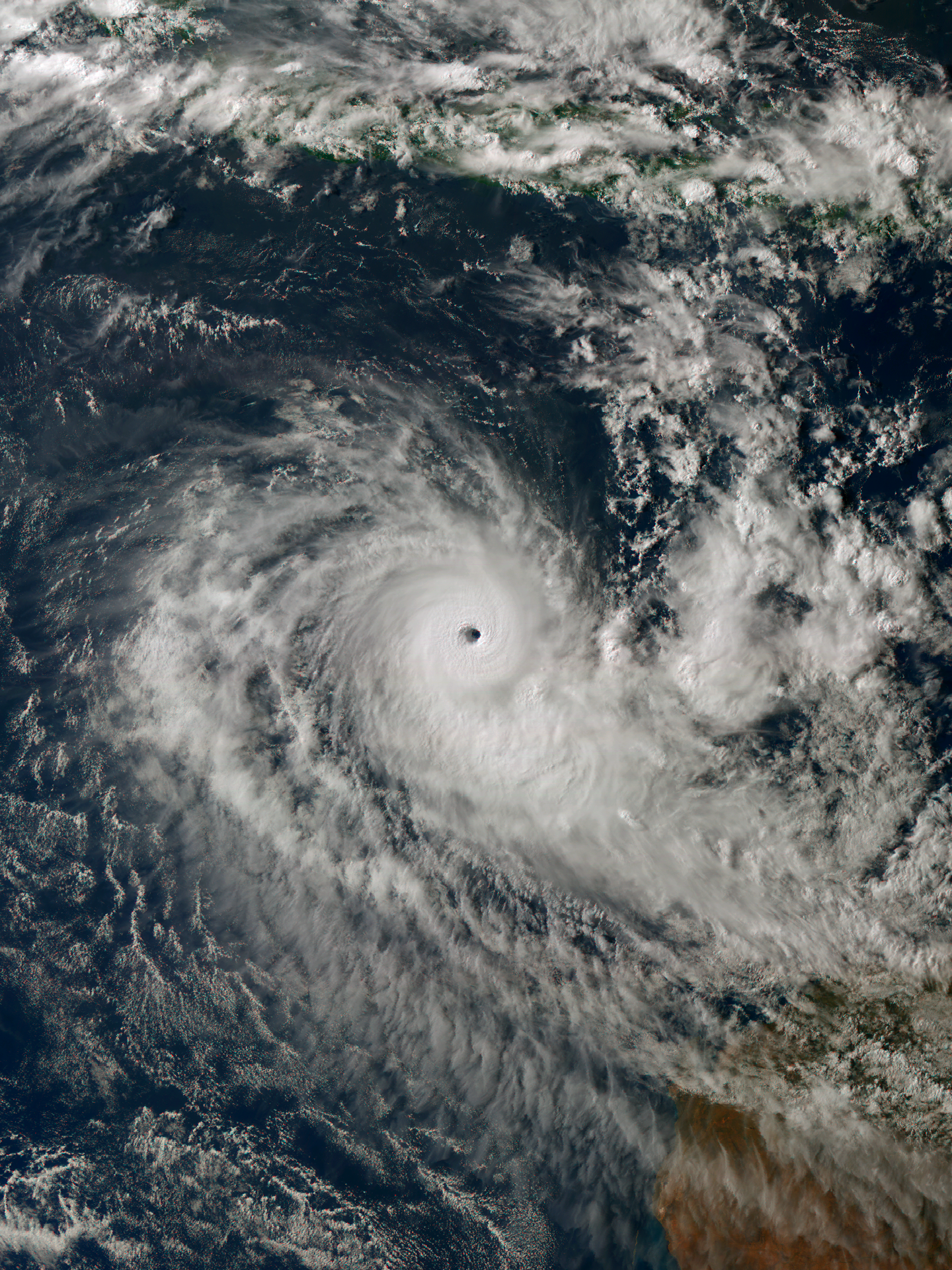
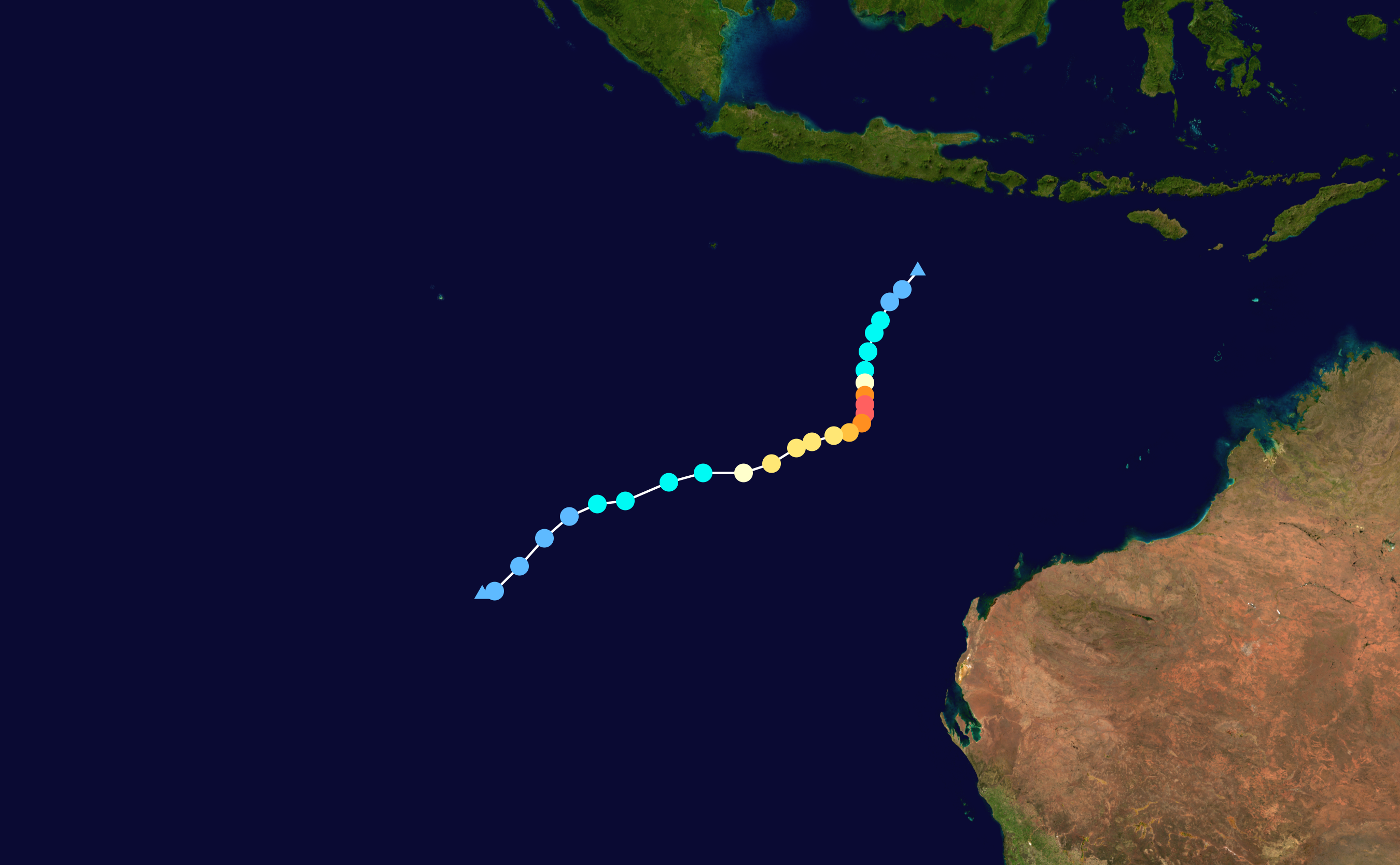
- Duration: 4 April – 11 April
- Peak intensity: 220 km/h (140 mph) (10-min); 924 hPa (mbar)

A tropical low formed on 4 April to the south of Indonesia, and east of Australia's Christmas Island. Wind shear prevented initial development, but a decrease in shear on 6 April allowed the low to intensify. That day, the BoM named the cyclone Ernie after the system developed gale-force winds around more than half of the circulation. A small storm, Ernie soon began a period of explosive intensification lasting about 24 hours, as it moved slowly southward. During that time, the cyclone developed a well-defined eye, 18 km (11 mi) in diameter. The BoM estimated that Ernie attained peak 10-minute sustained winds of 220 km/h (140 mph) on 7 April, gusting to 315 km/h (195 mph), making it a Category 5 on the Australian tropical cyclone intensity scale. The agency also estimated a central barometric pressure of 922 hPa (27.23 inHg). Meanwhile, the JTWC estimated peak 1 minute winds of 260 km/h (160 mph). The rate of intensification was among the quickest on record in the Southern Hemisphere. An increase in drier air and wind shear on 8 April caused Ernie to weaken quickly, as the storm began a steady west-southwest movement. By 10 April, the circulation was exposed from the convection, and the BoM downgraded below cyclone intensity. The low continued to the west-southwest, dissipating on 11 April.

=== Tropical Low 27U ===
- Tropical low (Australian scale)
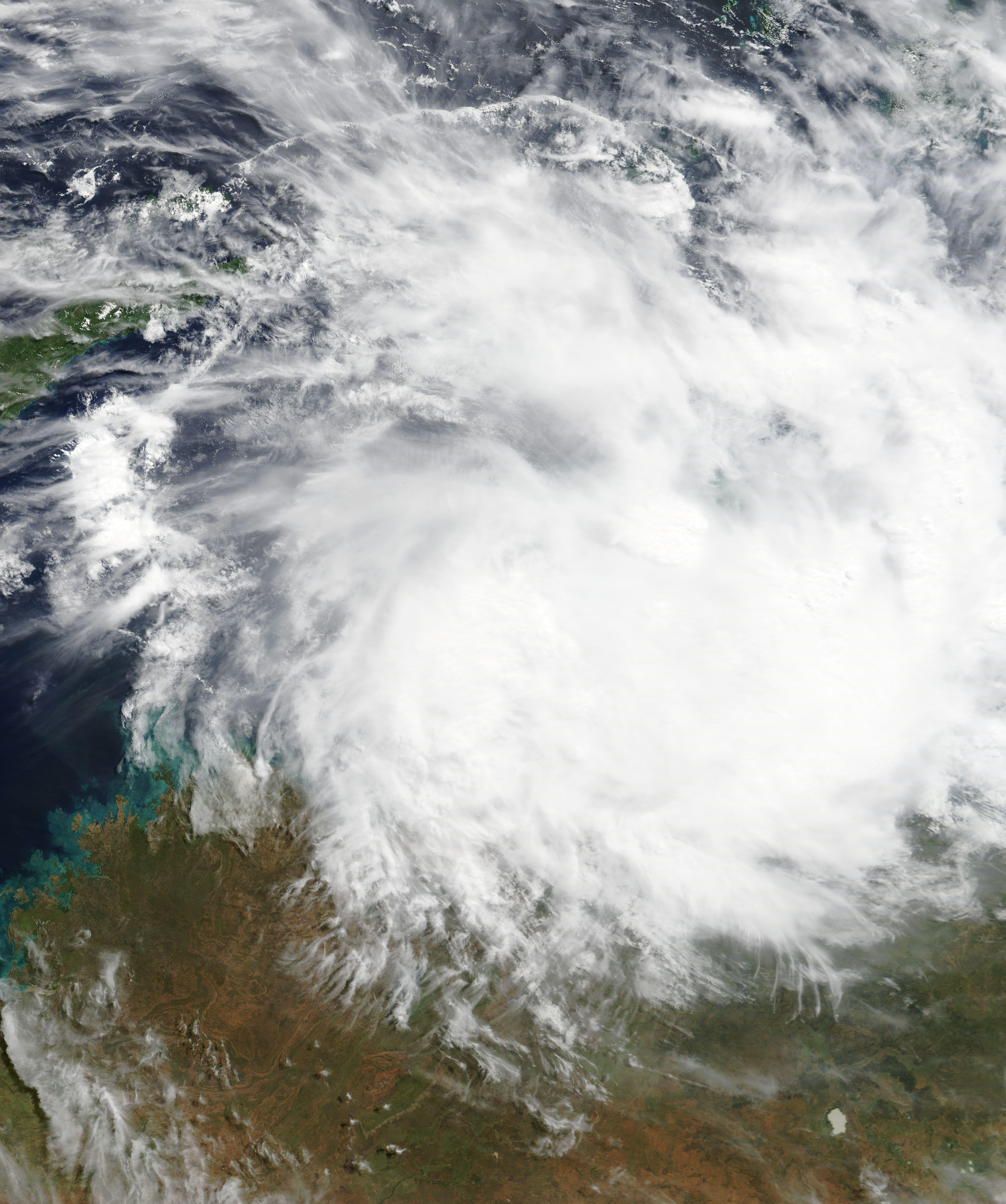
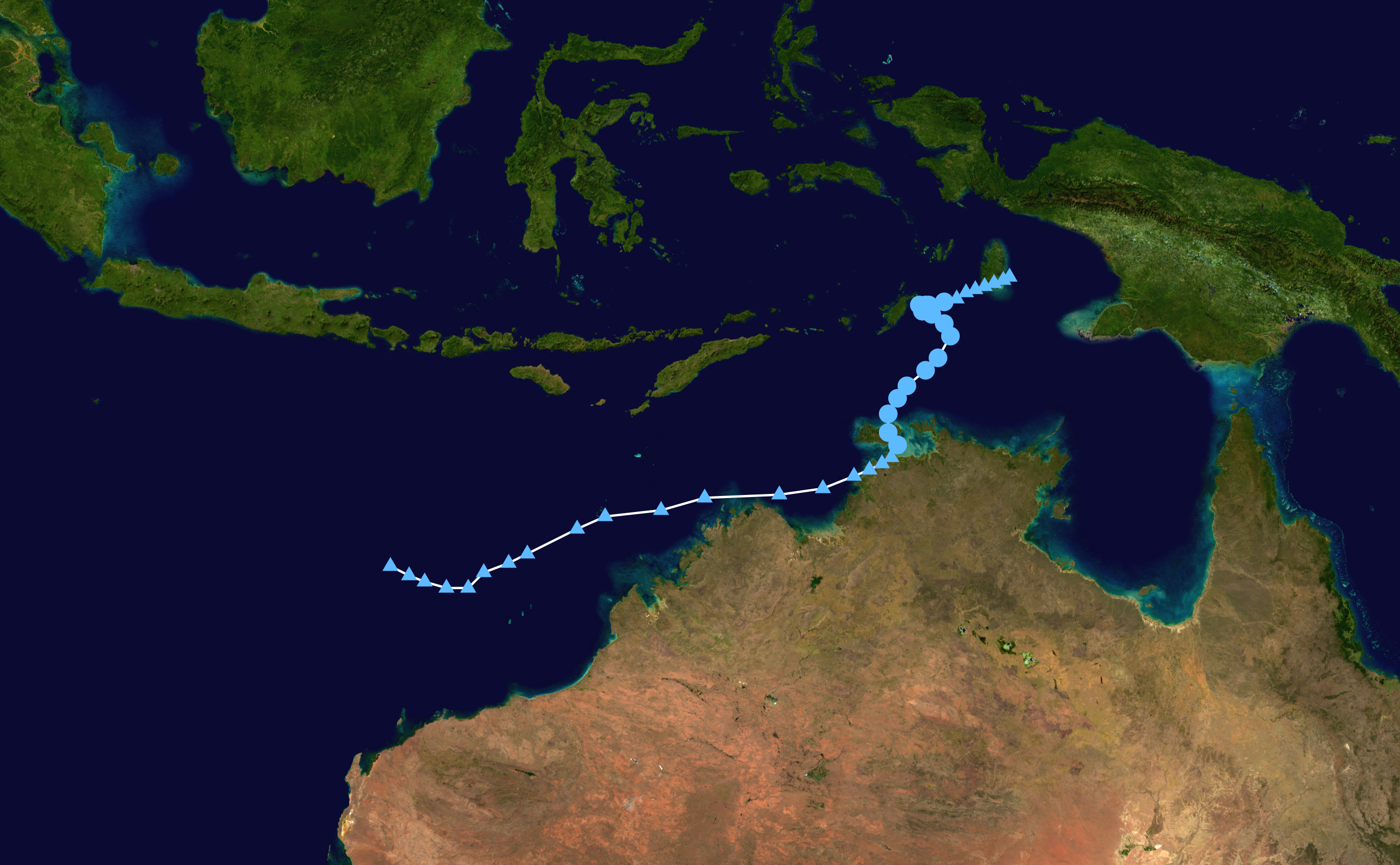
- Duration: 6 April – 16 April
- Peak intensity: 55 km/h (35 mph) (10-min); 998 hPa (mbar)

Tropical Low 27U originated as a slow-moving area of low pressure in an active monsoon trough in the eastern Arafura Sea off the west coast of New Guinea on 6 April. It initially tracked to the west-southwest while gradually intensifying before adopting a general southerly course. TCWC Darwin began issuing tropical cyclone warnings and forecast track maps for the tropical low, and initially predicted the system to reach Category 2 intensity on the Australian tropical cyclone intensity scale by 12 April. At 03:00 UTC on 10 April, the low-pressure system was located approximately 415 km (258 mi) offshore from Darwin, and was tracking southwards at approximately 9 km/h (5.6 mph). Despite the forecast intensification of Tropical Low 27U, a combination of factors such as land interaction with the northwest Top End and the displacement of the lower-level and upper-level circulation centres of the system due to high vertical wind shear significantly limited development, and ultimately began to degrade the system. Consequently, the tropical low never attained cyclone intensity, peaking with 10-minute sustained winds of 55 km/h (35 mph) and a central pressure of 998 hPa. The Bureau of Meteorology issued its final warning regarding the system on the afternoon of 12 April, which, coincidentally, was the time at which it was originally forecast to become a Category 2 cyclone. The system persisted as a tropical low while tracking west-southwestwards across the Timor Sea and into the Indian Ocean, passing very close to the Kimberley coast in the process.

=== Severe Tropical Cyclone Frances ===
- Category 3 severe tropical cyclone (Australian scale)
- Category 1 tropical cyclone (SSHWS)
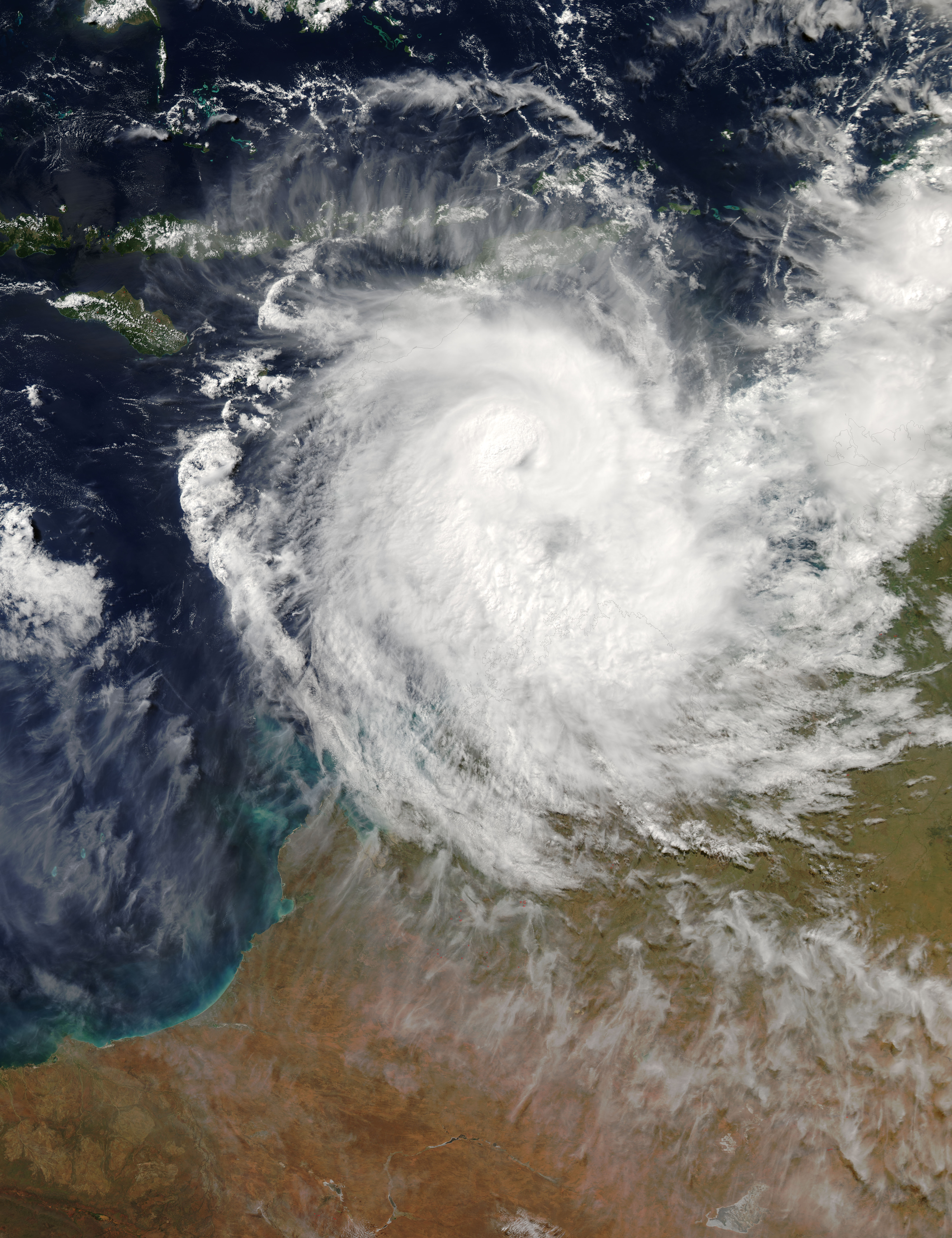
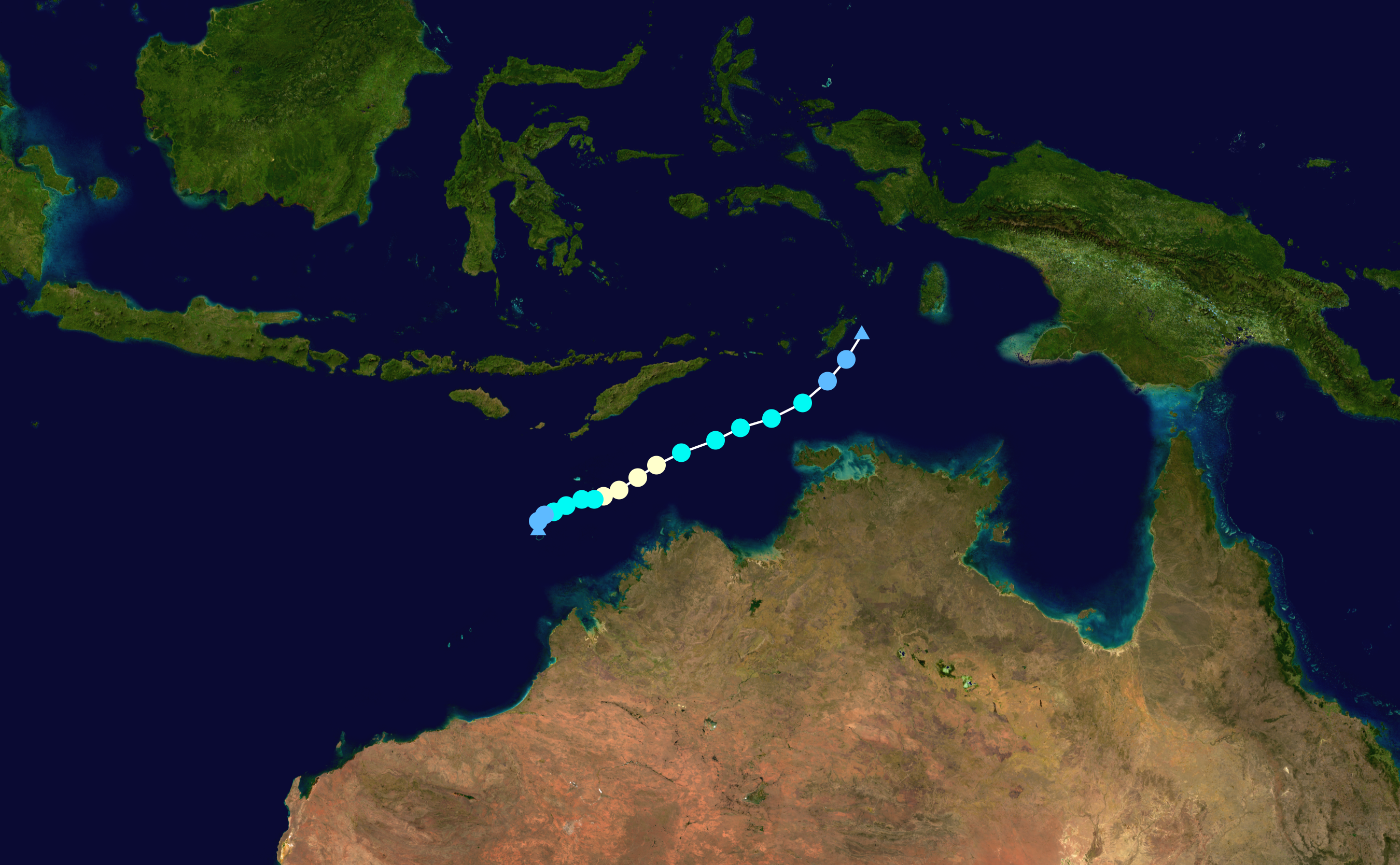
- Duration: 21 April – 1 May
- Peak intensity: 130 km/h (80 mph) (10-min); 978 hPa (mbar)

On the morning of 21 April, the BOM started tracking a tropical low which had formed about 200 km (120 mi) west of Port Moresby. The low proceeded to move westwards across the southern parts of Papua New Guinea during 22 April before emerging over the northeast Arafura Sea, 500 km (310 mi) north of Nhulunbuy during 23 April. The tropical low strengthened slowly while moving westwards across the Arafura Sea. The low passed south of the Aru Islands during 24 and 25 April.

During the night of 26 April, the low started moving in a southwest direction while undergoing a period of rapid intensification. The low continued to strengthen during 27 April, reaching Category 1 on the Australian tropical cyclone intensity scale at around 4:00 ACST later that afternoon, around 300 km (190 mi) northwest of Darwin, being named Frances in the process. Frances continued to move in a southwest direction over the Timor Sea, continuing to rapidly intensify. Frances reached Category 3 severe tropical cyclone strength by the afternoon of 28 April, just 24 hours after reaching tropical cyclone intensity. Frances maintained Category 3 strength until the morning of 29 April, where it rapidly weakened due to increasingly unfavorable atmospheric conditions, becoming a tropical low on the morning of 30 April.

=== Tropical Cyclone Greg ===
- Category 1 tropical cyclone (Australian scale)
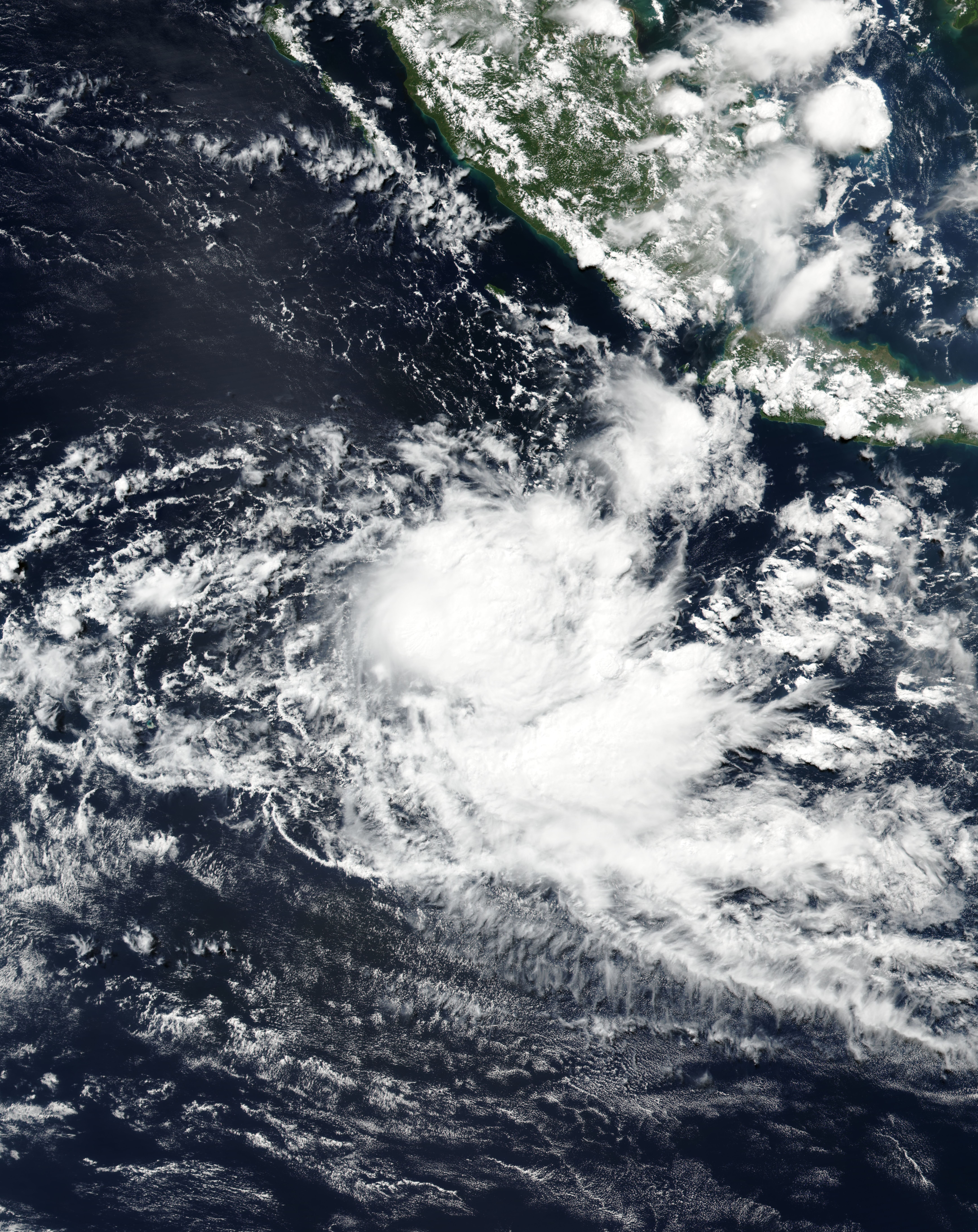
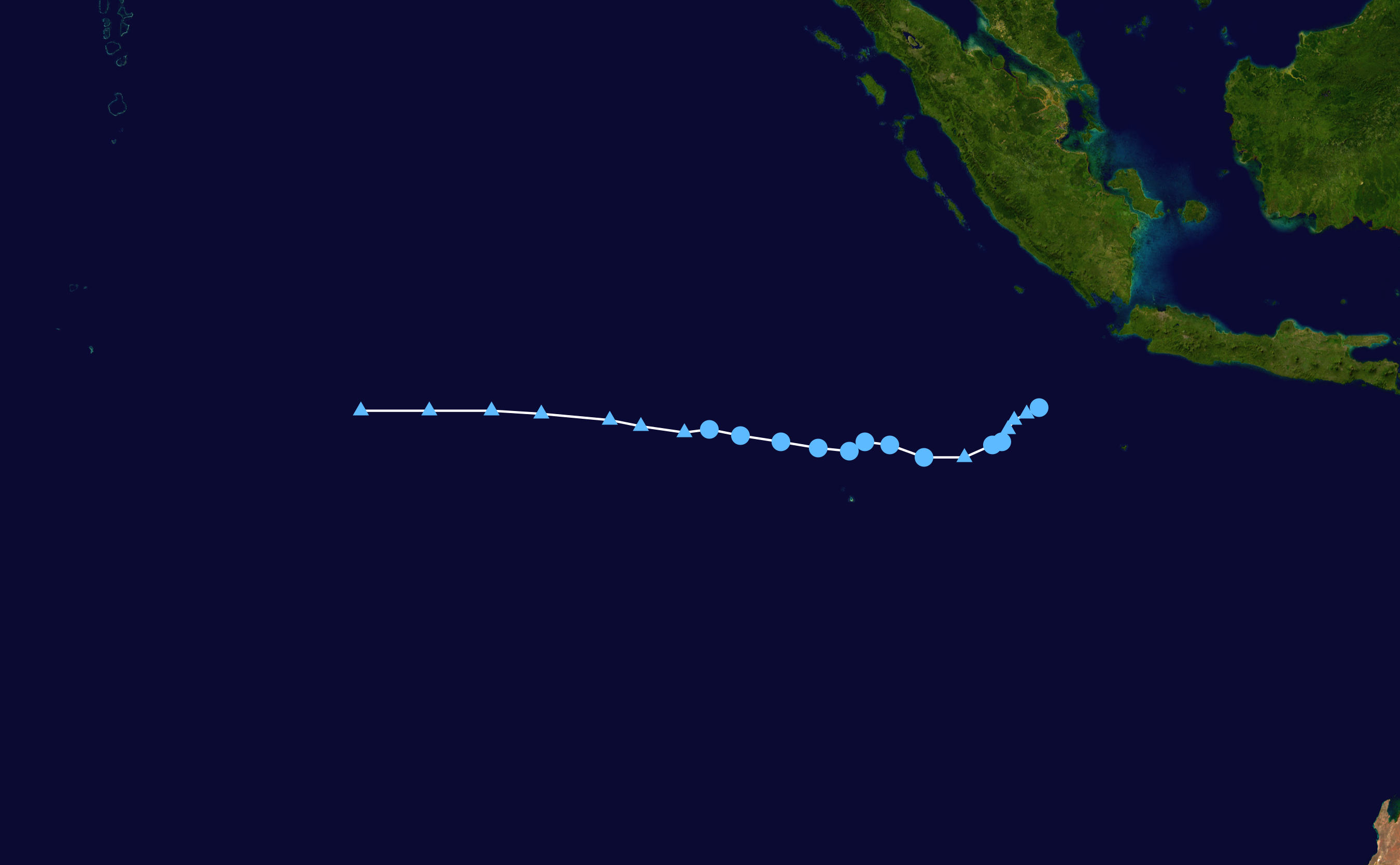
- Duration: 29 April – 1 May
- Peak intensity: 85 km/h (50 mph) (10-min); 995 hPa (mbar)

During 29 April, Tropical Low 30U developed about 755 km (470 mi) to the north-east of the Cocos Islands, within an area of warm sea surface temperatures and low vertical wind shear. The low had a compact and well defined circulation, with atmospheric convection wrapping into it as it moved southwards. The system was then classified as a Category 1 tropical cyclone and named Greg by the BoM during 30 April, as it peaked with 10-minute sustained wind speeds of 65 km/h (40 mph). During that day, the system turned westwards and weakened below tropical cyclone intensity into a remnant low during 1 May. Over the next few days, Greg's remnants were tracked, as they moved westwards out of the Australian region, before they dissipated during 4 May.

=== Other systems ===
Ahead of the season starting on 1 November, the Bureau of Meteorology, monitored two weak tropical lows that developed within the central Indian Ocean. The first noted as it developed within a monsoon trough to the northwest of Christmas Island during 23 September, but was not expected to develop any further as it moved southwards towards the Australian territory. The second low was first noted during 11 October, while it was located about 185 km (115 mi) to the northwest of Christmas Island. Over the next couple of days, the system moved south-westwards while its low-level circulation centre gradually consolidated, with the system's chance of becoming a short-lived tropical cyclone improving during 13 October. However, during the next day, the chances of the system developing into a tropical cyclone weakened, as a moderate to high amount of vertical wind shear impacted the low. The system was subsequently monitored over the next few days before they were last noted during 19 October after they had moved into the South-West Indian Ocean.

On 9 November, TCWC Perth started to monitor another tropical low. By 11 November, the JTWC classified it with a "low" chance of developing a tropical cyclone with scattered convection wrapping into its centre as it was located about 620 km (390 mi) to the northwest of the Cocos (Keeling) Islands. TCWC Perth also stated that it had a chance of becoming a tropical cyclone. After moving into unfavourable environments such as high shear, TCWC Perth issued its final bulletin during 15 November.

On 25 November, TCWC Perth started monitoring a weak tropical low to the southwest of Lampung. By the next day, it had moved north into TCWC Jakarta's area of responsibility. However, the system was not mentioned again in their next advisory.

During 27 November, a tropical low developed within the northern Coral Sea, to the southwest of the Solomon Islands. The system failed to develop further over the next couple of days before it moved south-eastwards into the South Pacific basin. The system was subsequently classified as Tropical Disturbance 03F on 29 November by the Fiji Meteorological Service before it was last noted during 30 November while located to the north of Nouméa, New Caledonia.

A weak tropical low developed to the south of Bali on 4 December, though due to unfavourable conditions the system soon weakened to a low-pressure area. On 9 December, a tropical low developed within the monsoon trough and moved slowly westwards. The system was last noted on 17 December.

On 3 January, a tropical low was located inland Australia to the southwest of the Top End. The system was given a "moderate" chance of strengthening into a tropical cyclone during the next day, however the system remained over land while moving southwest and did not develop further. TCWC Perth continued monitoring the system until 7 January when the tropical low was located over the border of East Pilbara and North Interior.

On 18 January, a tropical low had persisted over in the far northwest in the Indian Ocean until it was last noted the next day.

Similar to the previous system, another tropical low persisted over in the far northwest of the Western Region on 21 January. The low did not intensify and dissipated to the south of the island of Sumatra on 25 January.

Tropical Low 18U developed on 16 February off the western coast of Kimberley. During the next day, the low had emerged over open waters while near the Pilbara coast. The system had moved in a westerly direction until it was last noted on 22 February.

== Storm names ==
During the season, a total of eight tropical cyclones received a name from the BoM, either by TCWC Perth, Darwin, or Brisbane; the names are listed below. This was done when the system in question was judged to have 10-minute sustained wind speeds of 65 km/h (40 mph) that extended at least halfway around the system. There has only been one list from which the Bureau of Meteorology has assigned names to tropical cyclones since the 2008–09 season. Cyclones named by TCWC Jakarta and Port Moresby are rare, with the last named cyclones occurring during 2014 and 2007, respectively.

As a consequence of the devastating impacts of Severe Tropical Cyclone Debbie in March, the Bureau of Meteorology officially retired the name Debbie from the naming list.

- Yvette
- Alfred
- Blanche
- Caleb
- Debbie
- Ernie
- Frances
- Greg

== Season effects ==
This is a table of all the storms that formed in the 2016–17 Australian region cyclone season. It includes their duration, names, landfall(s), denoted in parentheses, damages, and death totals. Deaths in parentheses are additional and indirect (an example of an indirect death would be a traffic accident), but were still related to that storm. Damage and deaths include totals while the storm was extratropical, a wave, or a low, and all the damage figures are in 2016 USD.

Name	Dates	Peak intensity			Areas affected	Damage (USD)	Deaths	Ref(s).
Name	Dates	Category	Wind speed	Pressure	Areas affected	Damage (USD)	Deaths	Ref(s).
01U	23–29 September	Tropical low	Not specified	Not specified	None	None	None	
02U	12–18 October	Tropical low	Not specified	1,004 hPa (29.65 inHg)	None	None	None	
03U	9–15 November	Tropical low	Not specified	1,005 hPa (29.68 inHg)	None	None	None	
03F	27–28 November	Tropical low	Not specified	Not specified	Solomon Islands	None	None	
04U	4–6 December	Tropical low	Not specified	Not specified	None	None	None	
05U	9–17 December	Tropical low	Not specified	Not specified	None	None	None	
06U	18–23 December	Tropical low	55 km/h (35 mph)	994 hPa (29.35 inHg)	Western Australia	None	None	
Yvette	18–25 December	Category 1 tropical cyclone	85 km/h (50 mph)	987 hPa (29.15 inHg)	Western Australia	None	None	
08U	3–7 January	Tropical low	Not specified	994 hPa (29.35 inHg)	Northern Territory, Western Australia	None	None	
09U	3–15 January	Tropical low	Not specified	1,003 hPa (29.62 inHg)	Cocos (Keeling) Islands, Christmas Island	None	None	
10U	7–12 January	Tropical low	Not specified	1,001 hPa (29.56 inHg)	Northern Territory	None	None	
11U	7–8 January	Tropical low	Not specified	1,000 hPa (29.53 inHg)	Queensland	None	None	
12U	18–19 January	Tropical low	Not specified	Not specified	None	None	None	
13U	21–25 January	Tropical low	Not specified	1,009 hPa (29.80 inHg)	None	None	None	
14U	23–31 January	Tropical low	85 km/h (55 mph)	988 hPa (29.18 inHg)	Northern Territory, Western Australia	None	None	
15U	7–11 February	Tropical low	Not specified	984 hPa (29.06 inHg)	Western Australia	$153 million	2	
16U	9–10 February	Tropical low	Not specified	Not specified	New Caledonia	None	None	
17U	11–12 February	Tropical low	Not specified	1,004 hPa (29.65 inHg)	Northern Territory	None	None	
18U	16–22 February	Tropical low	Not specified	Not specified	None	None	None	
Alfred	15 – 22 February 2017	Category 2 tropical cyclone	95 km/h (60 mph)	987 hPa (29.15 inHg)	Queensland, Northern Territory	Unknown	Unknown	
Blanche	1 – 6 March 2017	Category 2 tropical cyclone	100 km/h (65 mph)	984 hPa (29.06 inHg)	Western Australia, Northern Territory	Minor	None	
21U	14–18 March	Tropical low	Not specified	Not specified	None	None	None	
22U	20 – 23 March 2017	Category 2 tropical cyclone	95 km/h (60 mph)	985 hPa (29.09 inHg)	Western Australia	Unknown	Unknown	
Caleb	23–27 March	Category 1 tropical cyclone	85 km/h (50 mph)	994 hPa (29.35 inHg)	Cocos (Keeling) Islands	None	None	
Debbie	23–30 March	Category 4 severe tropical cyclone	175 km/h (110 mph)	949 hPa (28.02 inHg)	Queensland, New South Wales, New Zealand	$2.67 billion	14	
25U	23–26 March	Tropical low	Not specified	Not specified	None	None	None	
Ernie	5–10 April	Category 5 severe tropical cyclone	220 km/h (135 mph)	924 hPa (27.29 inHg)	None	None	None	
27U	6–16 April	Tropical low	55 km/h (35 mph)	998 hPa (29.47 inHg)	Northern Territory, Western Australia	None	None	
Frances	21 April – 1 May	Category 3 severe tropical cyclone	120 km/h (75 mph)	980 hPa (28.94 inHg)	New Guinea, Maluku, Northern Territory, Timor, Western Australia	None	None	
Greg	29 April – 1 May 2017	Category 1 tropical cyclone	65 km/h (40 mph)	995 hPa (29.38 inHg)	None	None	None	
Season aggregates
30 systems	23 September – 3 May		220 km/h (135 mph)	922 hPa (27.23 inHg)		$2.82 billion	16	

== See also ==
- Weather of 2016 and 2017
- 2016–17 South Pacific cyclone season
- 2016–17 South-West Indian Ocean cyclone season
- Atlantic hurricane seasons: 2016, 2017
- Australian region tropical cyclone
- List of Southern Hemisphere tropical cyclone seasons
- North Indian Ocean cyclone seasons: 2016, 2017
- Pacific hurricane seasons: 2016, 2017
- Pacific typhoon seasons: 2016, 2017
- South Atlantic tropical cyclone
- Tropical cyclones in 2016 and 2017
