= Timeline of the 2016 Pacific hurricane season =

Hurricane season timeline

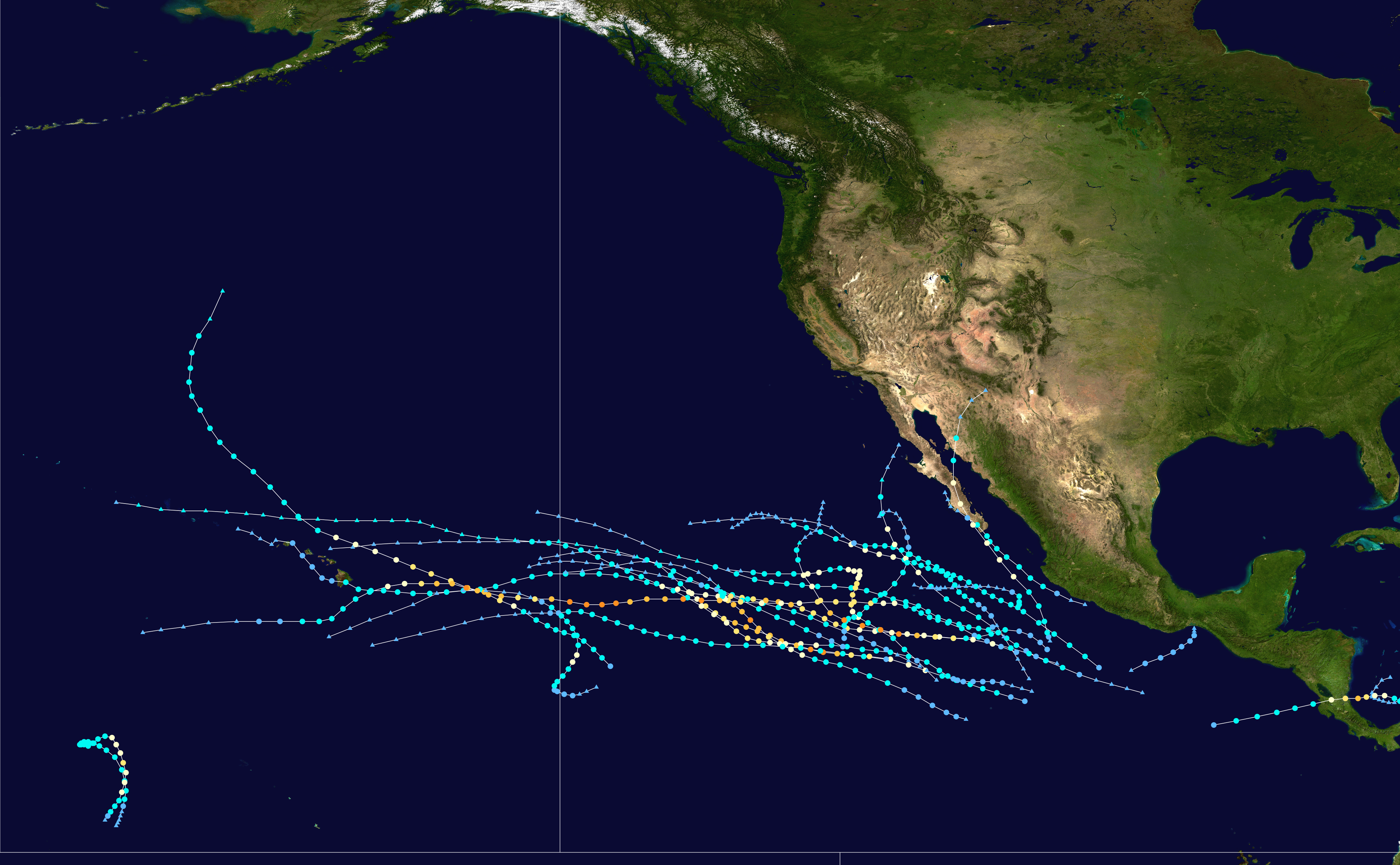
- Season summary map

Season boundaries
- First system formed: January 7, 2016 (record earliest)
- Last system dissipated: November 26, 2016

Strongest system
- Name: Seymour
- Maximum winds: 150 mph (240 km/h) (1-minute sustained)
- Lowest pressure: 940 mbar (hPa; 27.76 inHg)

Longest lasting system
- Name: Lester
- Duration: 17 days
Storm articles
- Hurricane Pali
- Hurricane Darby (2016)
- Hurricane Madeline (2016)
- Hurricane Newton (2016)
- Hurricane Otto

The 2016 Pacific hurricane season was an event in the annual cycle of tropical cyclone formation, in which tropical cyclones form in the eastern Pacific Ocean. The season officially started on May 15 in the eastern Pacific–east of 140°W–and on June 1 in the central Pacific–between the International Date Line and 140°W–and ended on November 30. These dates typically cover the period of each year when most tropical cyclones form in the eastern Pacific basin. However the first storm, Pali, formed 5 months before the official start of the season on January 7, which broke the record for having the earliest forming storm within the basin.

During the season, 22 tropical depressions developed within the basin, 21 of which became tropical storms. 13 of the tropical storms reached hurricane strength, with six achieving major hurricane intensity. (Note: A major hurricane is a storm that ranks as Category 3 or higher on the Saffir–Simpson hurricane wind scale.) Additionally, Tropical Storm Otto entered the basin after crossing over from the Atlantic, thus further contributing to the season total.

This timeline documents tropical cyclone formations, strengthening, weakening, landfalls, extratropical transitions, and dissipations during the season. It includes information that was not released throughout the season, meaning that data from post-storm reviews by the National Hurricane Center, such as a storm that was not initially warned upon, has been included.

The time stamp for each event is first stated using Coordinated Universal Time (UTC), the 24-hour clock where 00:00 = midnight UTC. The NHC uses both UTC and the time zone where the center of the tropical cyclone is currently located. The time zones utilized (east to west) are: Central, Mountain, Pacific and Hawaii. In this timeline, the respective area time is included in parentheses. Additionally, figures for maximum sustained winds and position estimates are rounded to the nearest 5 units (miles, or kilometers), following National Hurricane Center practice. Direct wind observations are rounded to the nearest whole number. Atmospheric pressures are listed to the nearest millibar and nearest hundredth of an inch of mercury.

== Timeline ==
=== January ===
January 7

- 06:00 UTC (8:00 p.m. HST, January 6) at 3.3°N 171.2°W – Tropical Depression One-C develops 935 miles (1,505 km) south of Johnston Island.
- 12:00 UTC (11:00 a.m. HST) at 3.8°N 171.1°W – Tropical Depression One-C strengthens into Tropical Storm Pali while located about 900 miles (1,450 km) south of Johnston Island, thus becoming the earliest named storm in the Central Pacific.

January 12

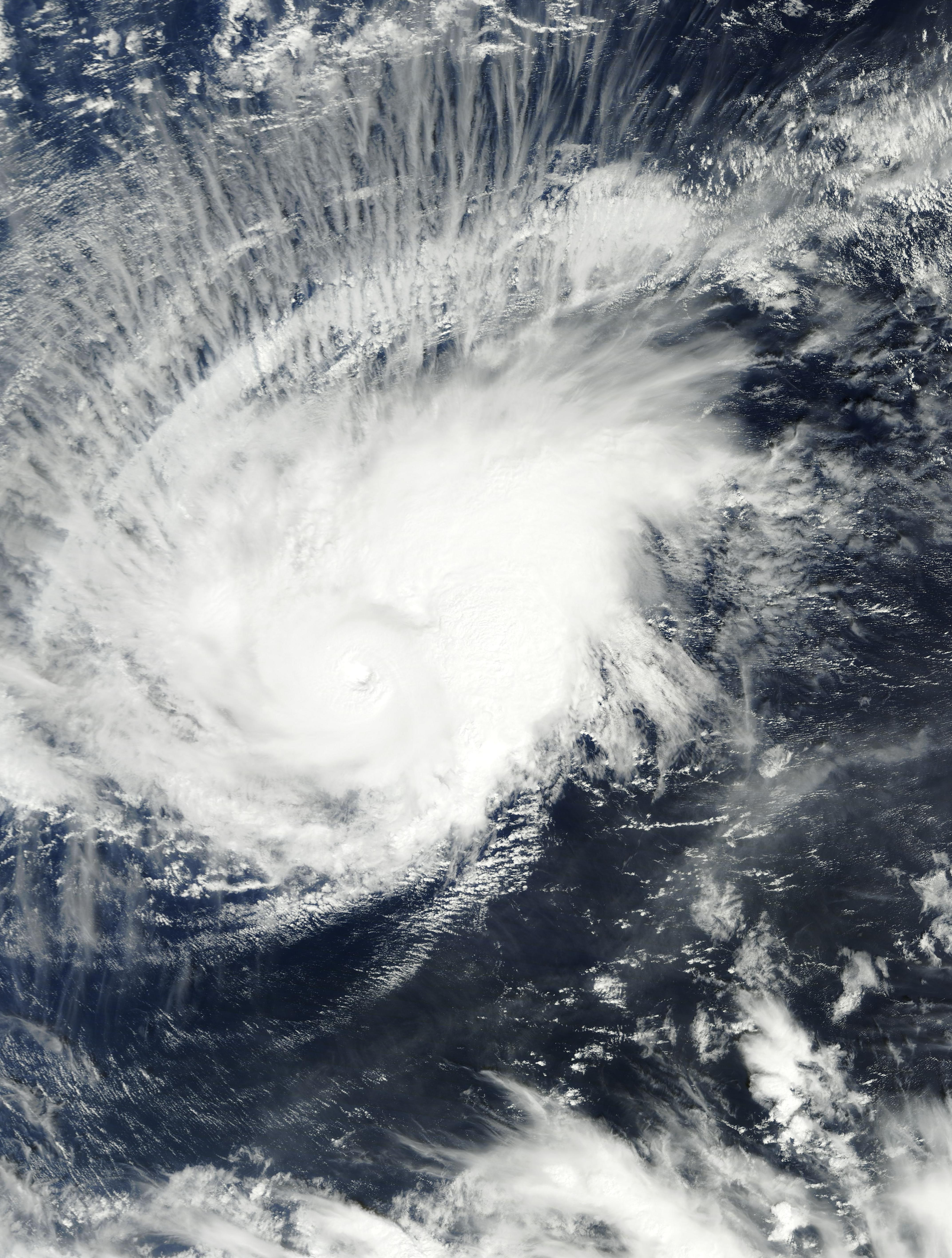
Hurricane Pali at peak strength on January 12

- 00:00 UTC (2:00 p.m. HST, January 11) at 8.2°N 172.0°W – Tropical Storm Pali strengthens into a Category 1 hurricane, becoming the earliest recorded hurricane within the basin, about 615 miles (985 km) south-southwest of Johnston Island.
- 18:00 UTC (8:00 a.m. HST) at 6.4°N 171.2°W – Hurricane Pali strengthens into a Category 2 hurricane about 725 miles (1,165 km) south of Johnston Island. It simultaneously achieves its peak strength with winds of 100 mph (160 km/h) and a pressure of 978 mbar (hPa; 28.88 inHg).

January 13

- 00:00 UTC (2:00 p.m. HST, January 12) at 5.7°N 171.0°W – Hurricane Pali weakens to a Category 1 hurricane roughly 770 miles (1,235 km) south of Johnston Island.
- 18:00 UTC (8:00 a.m. HST) at 3.7°N 171.5°W – Hurricane Pali weakens to a tropical storm about 910 miles (1465 km) south of Johnston Island.

January 14

- 12:00 UTC (2:00 a.m. HST) at 2.6°N 172.3°W – Tropical Storm Pali rapidly weakens to a tropical depression approximately 995 miles (1,600 km) south-southwest of Johnston Island.
- 18:00 UTC (8:00 a.m. HST) at 2.3°N 172.5°W – Tropical Depression Pali degenerates into a remnant low about 1,015 miles (1,635 km) south-southwest of Johnston Island.

January 15

- 00:00 UTC (2:00 p.m. HST, January 14) – The remnants of Pali dissipate.

=== May ===
May 15

- The 2016 Pacific hurricane season officially begins.

=== June ===
June 6

- 12:00 UTC (7:00 a.m. CDT) at 13.5°N 98.2°W – Tropical Depression One-E develops from an area of low pressure about 180 miles (290 km) south-southwest of Puerto Escondido, Mexico.
- 18:00 UTC (1:00 p.m. CDT) at 13.9°N 97.1°W – Tropical Depression One-E attains its peak intensity with maximum sustained winds of 35 mph (55 km/h) and a minimum barometric pressure of 1006 mbar (hPa; 29.71 inHg) roughly 135 mi (215 km) south of Puerto Escondido, Mexico.

June 8

- 00:00 UTC (7:00 p.m. CDT June 7) at 15.8°N 94.7°W – Tropical Depression One-E degenerates into a remnant low approximately 40 mi (65 km) southeast of Salina Cruz, Mexico.
- 12:00 UTC (7:00 a.m. CDT) – The remnants of One-E dissipate.

=== July ===
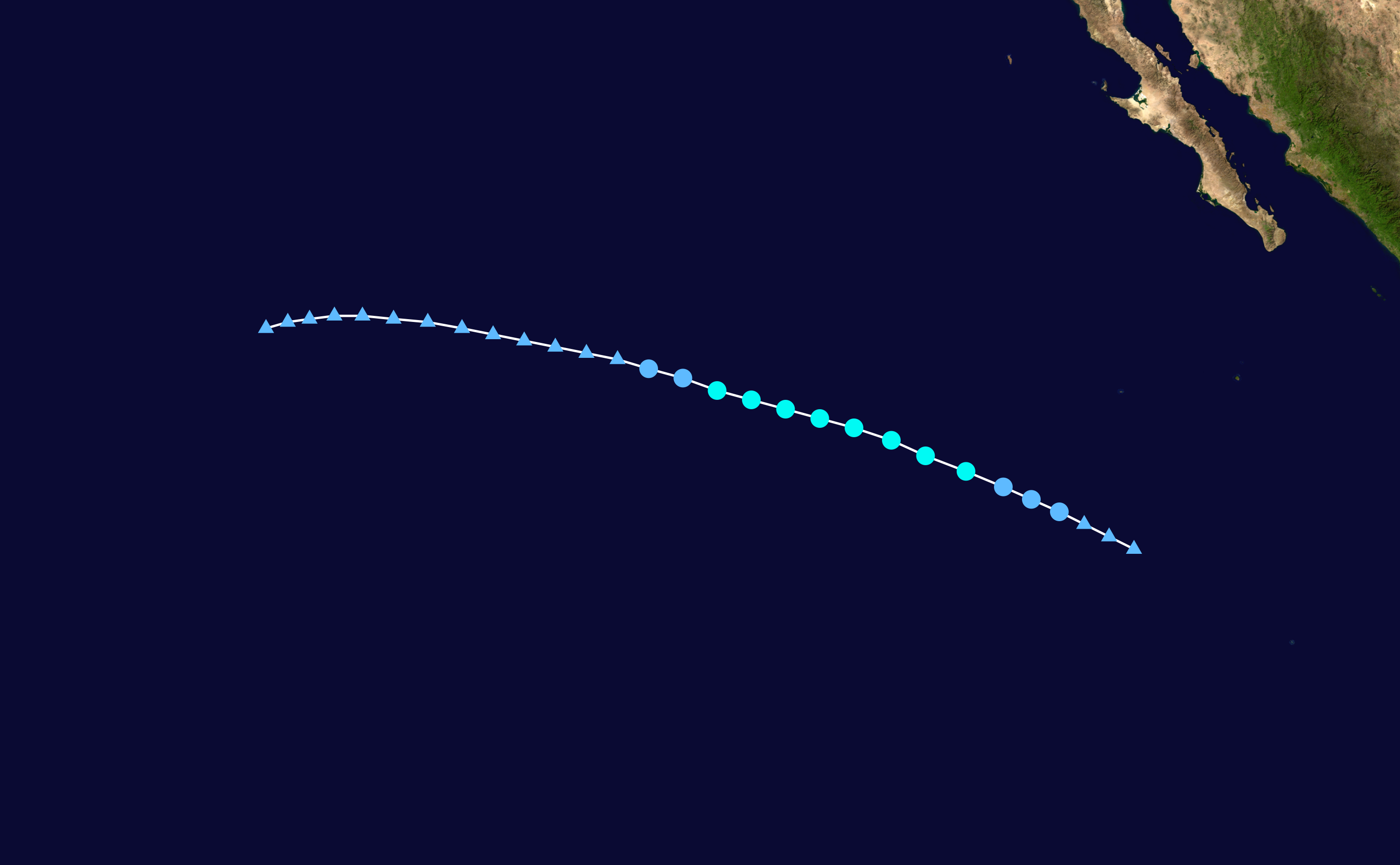
Track of Tropical Storm Agatha during early-July

July 2

- 00:00 UTC (5:00 p.m. PDT, July 1) at 14.5°N 116.7°W – Tropical Depression Two-E develops from an area of low pressure about 690 mi (1,110 km) southwest of the southern tip of the Baja California peninsula.
- 18:00 UTC (2:00 p.m. PDT) at 15.8°N 119.7°W – Tropical Depression Two-E intensifies into Tropical Storm Agatha roughly 800 mi (1,285 km) southwest of the Baja California peninsula.
- 18:00 UTC (12:00 p.m. MDT) at 10.8°N 106.8°W – Tropical Depression Three-E develops approximately 595 mi (960 km) southwest of Manzanillo, Mexico.

July 3

- 06:00 UTC (9:00 p.m. MDT July 2) at 11.4°N 108.8°W – Tropical Depression Three-E strengthens into Tropical Storm Blas about 605 mi (975 km) southwest of Manzanillo.
- 06:00 UTC (11:00 p.m. PDT, July 2) at 16.8°N 122.1°W – Tropical Storm Agatha attains its peak intensity with maximum sustained winds of 50 mph (80 km/h) and a minimum barometric pressure of 1002 mbar (hPa; 29.59 inHg) about 895 mi (1,440 km) southwest of the Baja California peninsula.

July 4

- 12:00 UTC (6:00 a.m. MDT) at 13.0°N 113.9°W – Tropical Storm Blas strengthens into a Category 1 hurricane about 730 mi (1,175 km) south-southwest of the southern tip of Baja California.
- 18:00 UTC (11:00 a.m. PDT) at 18.8°N 128.8°W – Tropical Storm Agatha weakens to a tropical depression about 1,250 mi (2,010 km) west-southwest of the Baja California peninsula.

July 5

- 06:00 UTC (11:00 p.m. PDT, July 4) at 19.4°N 130.9°W – Tropical Depression Agatha degenerates into a remnant area of low pressure roughly 1,375 mi (2,215 km) west-southwest of the Baja California peninsula.
- 06:00 UTC (11:00 p.m. PDT, July 4) at 14.0°N 117.9°W – Hurricane Blas strengthens into a Category 2 hurricane roughly 805 mi (1,295 km) southwest of the southern tip of Baja California.
- 18:00 UTC (11:00 a.m. PDT) at 14.2°N 120.2°W – Hurricane Blas rapidly intensifies into a Category 3 hurricane roughly 900 mi (1,450 km) southwest of the southern tip of Baja California.

July 6

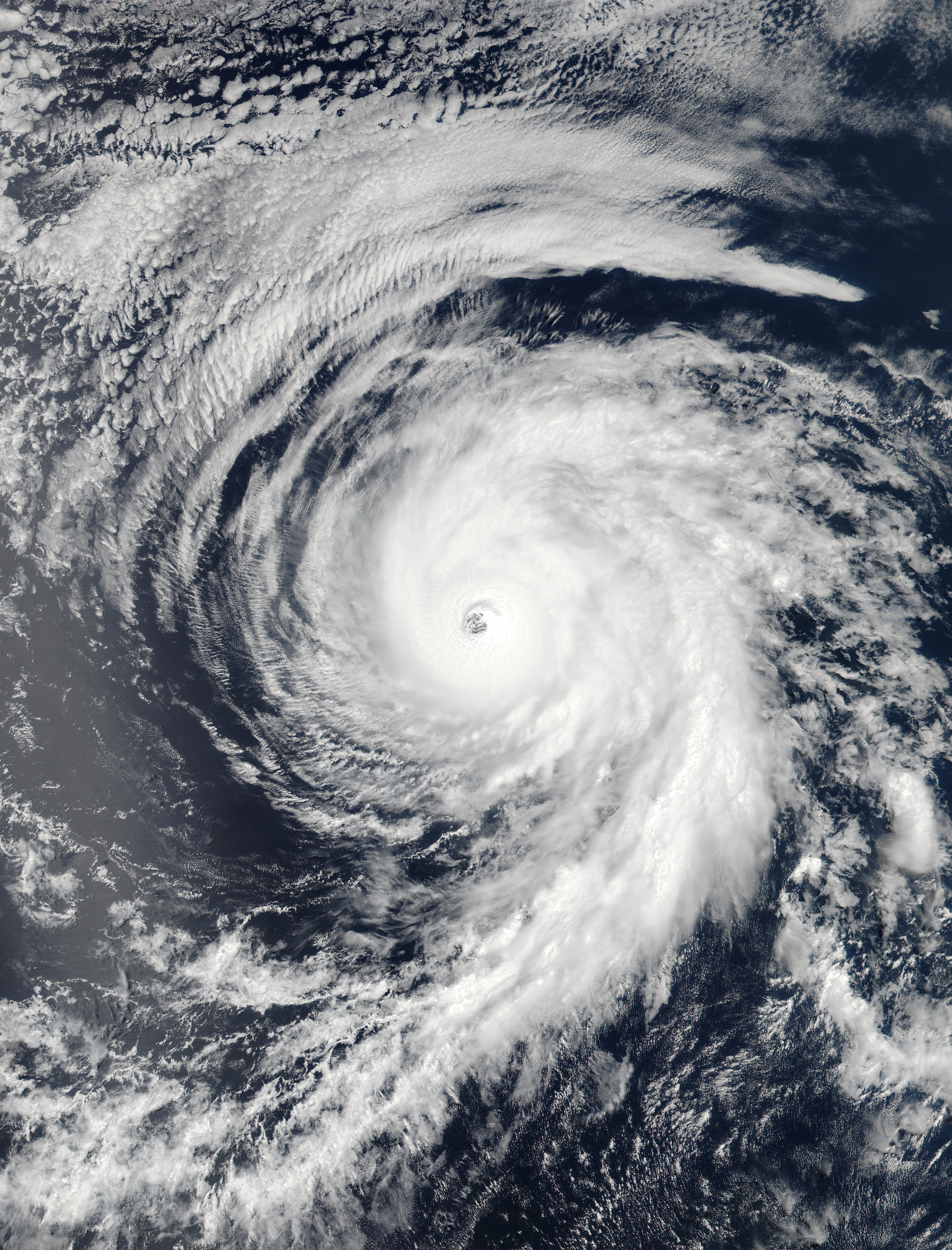
Hurricane Blas as a Category 3 hurricane on July 6

- 00:00 UTC (8:00 p.m. PDT July 5) at 14.3°N 121.2°W – Hurricane Blas strengthens into a Category 4 hurricane, simultaneously reaching its peak intensity with maximum sustained winds of 140 mph (225 km/h) and a barometric pressure of 947 mbar (hPa; 27.96 inHg) while situated approximately 945 mi (1,520 km) southwest of the southern tip of Baja California.
- 12:00 UTC (2:00 a.m. PDT) at 14.8°N 123.1°W – Hurricane Blas weakens to a Category 3 hurricane roughly 1,025 mi (1,650 km) southwest of the southern tip of Baja California.
- 18:00 UTC (12:00 p.m. MDT) – Tropical Depression Four-E develops from an area of low pressure about 545 mi (875 km) south-southwest of Manzanillo, Mexico.

July 8

- 00:00 UTC (5:00 p.m. PDT July 7) at 16.7°N 128.3°W – Hurricane Blas weakens to a Category 2 hurricane roughly 1,265 mi (2,035 km) west-southwest of the southern tip of Baja California.
- 12:00 UTC (2:00 a.m. HST) – the remnants of Agatha dissipate over the Central Pacific.
- 12:00 UTC (6:00 a.m. PDT) – Tropical Depression Four-E intensifies into Tropical Storm Celia roughly 725 mi (1,165 km) south-southwest of the Baja California peninsula.
- 18:00 UTC (11:00 a.m. PDT) at 18.1°N 130.2°W – Hurricane Blas weakens to a Category 1 hurricane roughly 1,350 mi (2,175 km) west of the southern tip of Baja California.

July 9

- 06:00 UTC (2:00 a.m. PDT) at 19.2°N 131.4°W – Hurricane Blas rapidly weakens to a tropical storm roughly 1,405 mi (2,260 km) west of the southern tip of Baja California.

July 10

- 06:00 UTC (11:00 p.m. PDT, July 9) at 21.1°N 134.7°W – Tropical Storm Blas degenerates into a remnant low about 1,320 mi (2,125 km) east of Hilo, Hawaii.
- 18:00 UTC (11:00 a.m. PDT) – Tropical Storm Celia intensifies into a Category 1 hurricane approximately 955 mi (1,535 km) southwest of the Baja California peninsula.

July 11

- 12:00 UTC (6:00 a.m. MDT) – Tropical Depression Five-E develops from an area of low pressure about 290 mi (465 km) south-southwest of Manzanillo, Mexico.
- 18:00 UTC (11:00 a.m. PDT) – Hurricane Celia intensifies into a Category 2 hurricane and simultaneously attains its peak intensity with maximum sustained winds of 100 mph (160 km/h) and a minimum barometric pressure of 972 mbar (hPa; 28.70 inHg) about 1,170 mi (1,885 km) southwest of the Baja California peninsula.

July 12

- 00:00 UTC (5:00 p.m. PDT, July 11) – The remnants of Blas dissipate.
- 12:00 UTC (5:00 a.m. PDT) – Hurricane Celia weakens to a Category 1 hurricane roughly 1,265 mi (2,035 km) west-southwest of the Baja California peninsula.
- 12:00 UTC (6:00 a.m. MDT) – Tropical Depression Five-E intensifies into Tropical Storm Darby about 335 mi (540 km) southwest of Manzanillo, Mexico.

July 13

- 06:00 UTC (11:00 p.m. PDT, July 12) – Hurricane Celia weakens to a tropical storm approximately 1,570 mi (2,525 km) east-southeast of the Hawaiian Islands.
- 18:00 UTC (12:00 p.m. MDT) – Tropical Storm Darby intensifies into a Category 1 hurricane about 545 mi (875 km) south-southwest of the Baja California peninsula.

July 15

- 06:00 UTC (11:00 p.m. PDT, July 14) – Hurricane Darby intensifies into a Category 2 hurricane roughly 780 mi (1,255 km) southwest of the Baja California peninsula.
- 12:00 UTC (6:00 am. MDT) – Tropical Depression Six-E develops from an area of low pressure about 365 mi (585 km) south-southwest of Manzanillo, Mexico.

July 16

- 00:00 UTC (5:00 p.m. PDT, July 15) – Tropical Storm Celia degenerates into a remnant area of low pressure about 775 mi (1,245 km) east of the Hawaiian Islands.
- 00:00 UTC (6:00 p.m. MDT, July 15) – Tropical Depression Six-E intensifies into Tropical Storm Estelle about 355 mi (570 km) southwest of Manzanillo, Mexico.
- 12:00 UTC (5:00 a.m. PDT) – Hurricane Darby intensifies into a Category 3 hurricane roughly 945 mi (1,520 km) west-southwest of the Baja California peninsula.
- 18:00 UTC (11:00 a.m. PDT) – Hurricane Darby attains its peak intensity with maximum sustained winds of 120 mph (195 km/h) and a minimum barometric pressure of 958 mbar (hPa; 28.29 inHg) approximately 995 mi (1,600 km) west-southwest of the Baja California peninsula.

July 17

- 06:00 UTC (11:00 p.m. PDT, July 16) – Hurricane Darby weakens to a Category 2 hurricane about 1,100 mi (1,770 km) west-southwest of the Baja California peninsula.
- 18:00 UTC (12:00 p.m. MDT) – Tropical Storm Estelle attains its peak intensity with maximum sustained winds of 70 mph (115 km/h) and a minimum barometric pressure of 990 mbar (hPa; 29.23 inHg) about 465 mi (750 km) south-southwest of the Baja California peninsula.

July 18

- 00:00 UTC (5:00 p.m. PDT, July 17) – Hurricane Darby weakens to a Category 1 hurricane roughly 1,255 mi (2,020 km) west-southwest of the Baja California peninsula.

July 19

- 06:00 UTC (11:00 p.m. PDT, July 18) – Hurricane Darby weakens to a tropical storm approximately 1,380 mi (2,220 km) east-southeast of the Hawaiian Islands.

July 21

- 06:00 UTC (1:00 a.m. CDT) – Tropical Depression Seven-E develops from an area of low pressure about 290 mi (465 km) south-southeast of Manzanillo, Mexico.
- 06:00 UTC (12:00 a.m. MDT) – Tropical Depression Eight-E develops from an area of low pressure approximately 805 mi (1,295 km) southwest of Manzanillo, Mexico.
- 12:00 UTC (7:00 a.m. CDT) – Tropical Depression Seven-E intensifies into Tropical Storm Frank roughly 365 mi (585 km) south-southeast of Manzanillo, Mexico.

July 22

A chain of four storms in the eastern Pacific on July 22; shown from left to right are Darby, Estelle, Eight-E (which later became Georgette), and Frank

- 00:00 UTC (5:00 p.m. PDT, July 21) – Tropical Storm Estelle degenerates into a remnant area of low pressure about 1,605 mi (2,585 km) east-southeast of the Hawaiian Islands.
- 12:00 UTC (5:00 a.m. PDT) – Tropical Depression Eight-E intensifies into Tropical Storm Georgette roughly 855 mi (1,375 km) south-southwest of the Baja California peninsula.

July 24

- 00:00 UTC (5:00 p.m. PDT, July 23) – Tropical Storm Georgette intensifies into a Category 1 hurricane about 1,025 mi (1,650 km) southwest of the Baja California peninsula.
- 18:00 UTC (11:00 a.m. PDT) – Hurricane Georgette intensifies into a Category 2 hurricane about 1,105 mi (1,780 km) southwest of the Baja California peninsula.

July 25

- 00:00 UTC (5:00 p.m. PDT, July 24) – Hurricane Georgette intensifies into a Category 3 hurricane about 1,130 mi (1,820 km) southwest of the Baja California peninsula.
- 06:00 UTC (11:00 p.m. PDT, July 24) – Hurricane Georgette intensifies into a Category 4 hurricane and simultaneously attains its peak intensity with maximum sustained winds of 130 mph (210 km/h) and a minimum barometric pressure of 952 mbar (hPa; 28.11 inHg) about 1,150 mi (1,850 km) west-southwest of the Baja California peninsula.
- 12:00 UTC (2:00 a.m. HST) – Tropical Storm Darby weakens to a tropical depression about 25 mi (40 km) north of Niʻihau, Hawaii.
- 12:00 UTC (5:00 a.m. PDT) – Hurricane Georgette weakens to a Category 3 hurricane about 1,175 mi (1,890 km) west-southwest of the Baja California peninsula.

July 26

- 00:00 UTC (2:00 p.m. HST, July 25) – Tropical Depression Darby degenerates into a remnant area of low pressure about 85 mi (135 km) northwest of Niʻihau, Hawaii.
- 00:00 UTC (5:00 p.m. PDT, July 25) – Hurricane Georgette weakens to a Category 2 hurricane about 1,220 mi (1,965 km) west-southwest of the Baja California peninsula.
- 06:00 UTC (11:00 p.m. PDT, July 25) – Hurricane Georgette weakens to a Category 1 hurricane about 1,235 mi (1,990 km) west-southwest of the Baja California peninsula.
- 12:00 UTC (5:00 a.m. PDT) – Tropical Storm Frank intensifies into a Category 1 hurricane roughly 415 mi (670 km) west-southwest of the Baja California peninsula.
- 18:00 UTC (11:00 a.m. PDT) – Hurricane Georgette weakens to a tropical storm about 1,240 mi (1,995 km) west-southwest of the Baja California peninsula.

July 27

- 00:00 UTC (5:00 p.m. PDT, July 26) – Hurricane Frank attains its peak intensity with maximum sustained winds of 85 mph (135 km/h) and a minimum barometric pressure of 979 mbar (hPa; 28.91 inHg) approximately 530 mi (855 km) west-southwest of the Baja California peninsula.
- 06:00 UTC (11:00 p.m. PDT, July 26) – Tropical Storm Georgette degenerates into a remnant area of low pressure about 1,245 mi (2,005 km) west-southwest of the Baja California peninsula.
- 12:00 UTC (5:00 a.m. PDT) – Hurricane Frank weakens to a tropical storm about 655 mi (1,055 km) west of the Baja California peninsula.

July 28

- 12:00 UTC (5:00 a.m. PDT) – Tropical Storm Frank degenerates into a remnant area of low pressure roughly 895 mi (1,440 km) west-northwest of the Baja California peninsula.

=== August ===
August 3

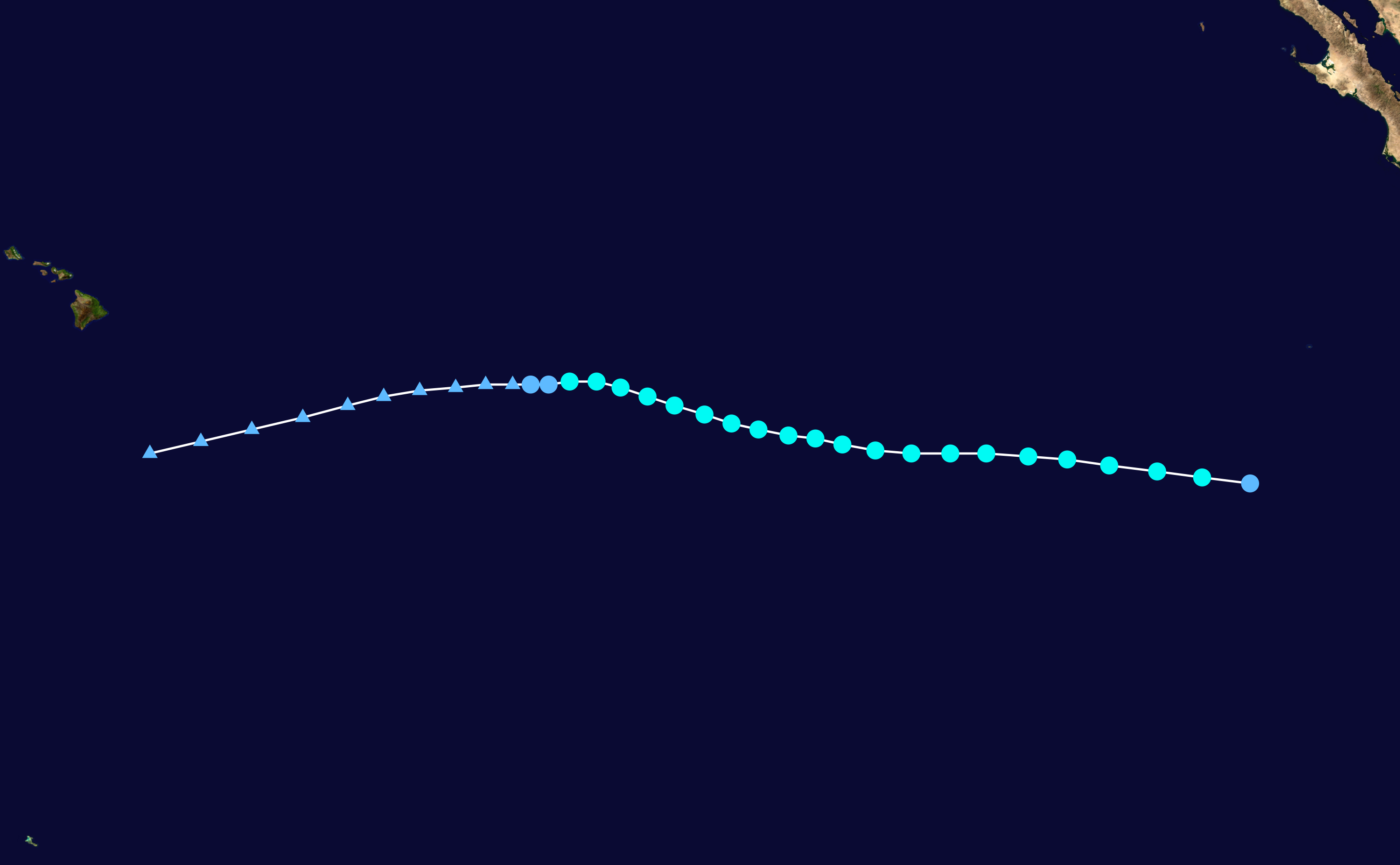
Track of Tropical Storm Ivette during early-August

- 00:00 UTC (5:00 p.m. PDT, August 2) – Tropical Depression Ten-E develops from an area of low pressure about 750 mi (1,205 km) southwest of the Baja California peninsula.
- 06:00 UTC (11:00 p.m. PDT, August 2) – Tropical Depression Ten-E intensifies into Tropical Storm Ivette roughly 820 mi (1,320 km) southwest of the Baja California peninsula.

August 5

- 18:00 UTC (11:00 a.m. PDT) – Tropical Storm Ivette attains its peak intensity with maximum sustained winds of 60 mph (95 km/h) and a minimum barometric pressure of 1000 mbar (hPa; 29.53 inHg) approximately 1,485 mi (2,390 km) west-southwest of the Baja California peninsula.

August 7

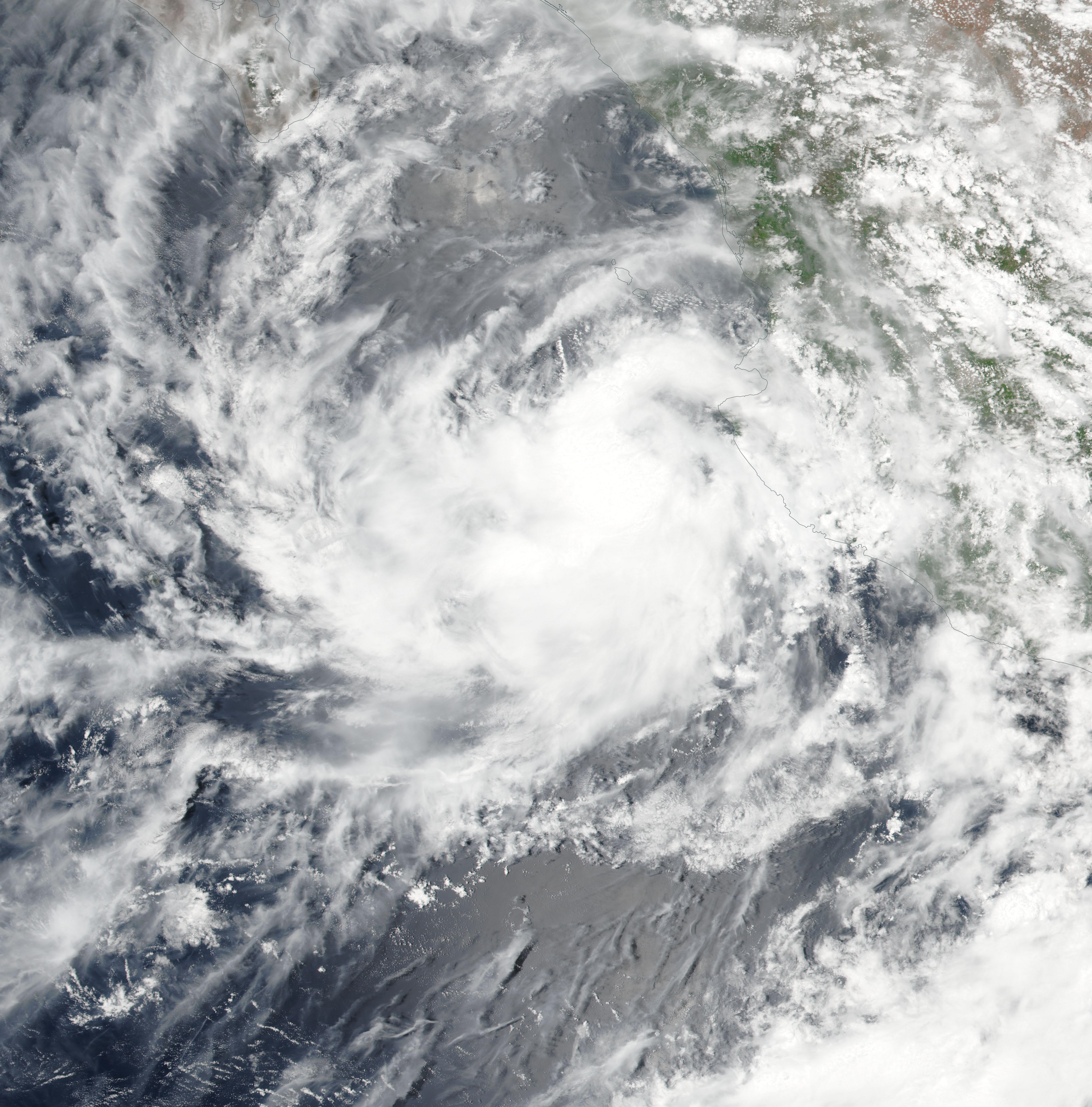
Tropical Storm Javier shortly after being named on August 7

- 06:00 UTC (1:00 a.m. CDT) – Tropical Depression Eleven-E develops from an area of low pressure about 120 mi (195 km) south-southeast of Manzanillo, Mexico.
- 12:00 UTC (7:00 a.m. CDT) – Tropical Depression Eleven-E intensifies into Tropical Storm Javier about 50 mi (80 km) south of Manzanillo, Mexico.

August 8

- 06:00 UTC (8:00 p.m. HST, August 7) – Tropical Storm Ivette weakens to a tropical depression about 990 mi (1,595 km) east-southeast of the Hawaiian Islands.
- 18:00 UTC (8:00 a.m. HST) – Tropical Depression Ivette degenerates to a remnant area of low pressure roughly 910 mi (1,465 km) east-southeast of the Hawaiian Islands.
- 18:00 UTC (12:00 p.m. MDT) – Tropical Storm Javier attains its peak intensity with maximum sustained winds of 65 mph (105 km/h) and a minimum barometric pressure of 997 mbar (hPa; 29.44 inHg) about 65 mi (105 km) south-southeast of San José del Cabo, Mexico.

August 9

- 03:30 UTC (9:30 p.m. MDT, August 8) – Tropical Storm Javier makes landfall near San José del Cabo, Mexico, with winds of 50 mph (80 km/h).
- 12:00 UTC (6:00 a.m. MDT) – Tropical Storm Javier weakens to a tropical depression about 100 mi (160 km) northwest of San José del Cabo, Mexico.
- 18:00 UTC (12:00 p.m. MDT) – Tropical Depression Javier degenerates to a remnant area of low pressure about 155 mi (250 km) northwest of San José del Cabo, Mexico.

August 18

- 12:00 UTC (6:00 a.m. MDT) – Tropical Depression Twelve-E develops from an area of low pressure about 410 mi (660 km) south-southeast of the Baja California peninsula.

August 19

- 06:00 UTC (12:00 a.m. MDT) – Tropical Depression Twelve-E intensifies into Tropical Storm Kay about 340 mi (545 km) south of the Baja California peninsula.

August 20

- 12:00 UTC (6:00 a.m. MDT) – Tropical Storm Kay attains peak winds of 50 mph (80 km/h) about 260 mi (420 km) southwest of the Baja California peninsula.

August 21

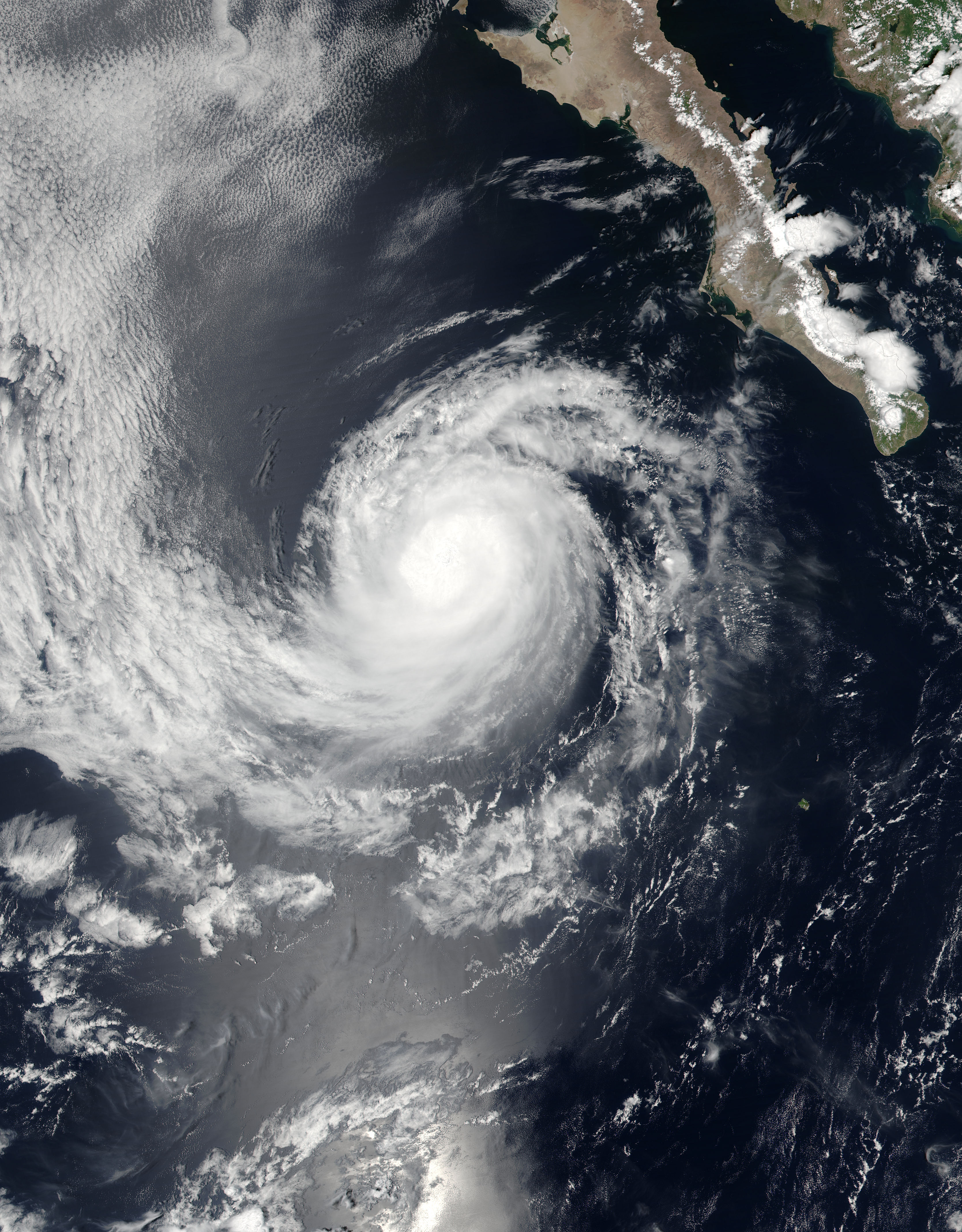
Tropical Storm Kay at peak intensity on August 21

- 18:00 UTC (11:00 a.m. PDT) – Tropical Storm Kay attains a minimum barometric pressure of 1000 mbar (hPa; 29.53 inHg) about 340 mi (545 km) west-southwest of the Baja California peninsula.

August 23

- 06:00 UTC (11:00 p.m. PDT, August 22) – Tropical Storm Kay weakens to a tropical depression about 580 mi (935 km) west of the Baja California peninsula.
- 12:00 UTC (5:00 a.m. PDT) – Tropical Depression Kay degenerates to a remnant area of low pressure about 630 mi (1,015 km) west of the Baja California peninsula.

August 24

- 06:00 UTC (12:00 a.m. MDT) – Tropical Depression Thirteen-E develops from an area of low pressure about 385 mi (620 km) south-southwest of Manzanillo, Mexico.

August 25

- 06:00 UTC (12:00 a.m. MDT) – Tropical Depression Thirteen-E intensifies into Tropical Storm Lester about 485 mi (780 km) south of the Baja California peninsula.

August 26

- 18:00 UTC (11:00 a.m. PDT) – Tropical Depression Fourteen-E develops from an area of low pressure about 1,295 mi (2,085 km) east-southeast of the Hawaiian Islands.

August 27

- 00:00 UTC (5:00 p.m. PDT, August 26) – Tropical Storm Lester intensifies into a Category 1 hurricane about 530 mi (855 km) southwest of the Baja California peninsula.
- 00:00 UTC (5:00 p.m. PDT, August 27) – Tropical Depression Fourteen-E intensifies into Tropical Storm Madeline about 1,250 mi (2,010 km) east-southeast of the Hawaiian Islands.
- 12:00 UTC (5:00 a.m. PDT) – Hurricane Lester intensifies into a Category 2 hurricane about 615 mi (990 km) southwest of the Baja California peninsula.

August 28

- 12:00 UTC (5:00 a.m. PDT) – Hurricane Lester weakens to a Category 1 hurricane about 905 mi (1,455 km) west-southwest of the Baja California peninsula.

August 29

- 06:00 UTC (11:00 p.m. PDT, August 28) – Hurricane Lester re-intensifies into a Category 2 hurricane about 1,160 mi (1,865 km) west-southwest of the Baja California peninsula.
- 12:00 UTC (5:00 a.m. PDT) – Hurricane Lester intensifies into a Category 3 hurricane about 1,255 mi (2,020 km) west-southwest of the Baja California peninsula.
- 18:00 UTC (11:00 a.m. PDT) – Hurricane Lester intensifies into a Category 4 hurricane about 1,335 mi (2,180 km) west-southwest of the Baja California peninsula.

August 30

- 06:00 UTC (11:00 p.m. PDT, August 29) – Hurricane Lester weakens to a Category 3 hurricane about 1,470 mi (2,365 km) southeast of the Hawaiian Islands.

August 31

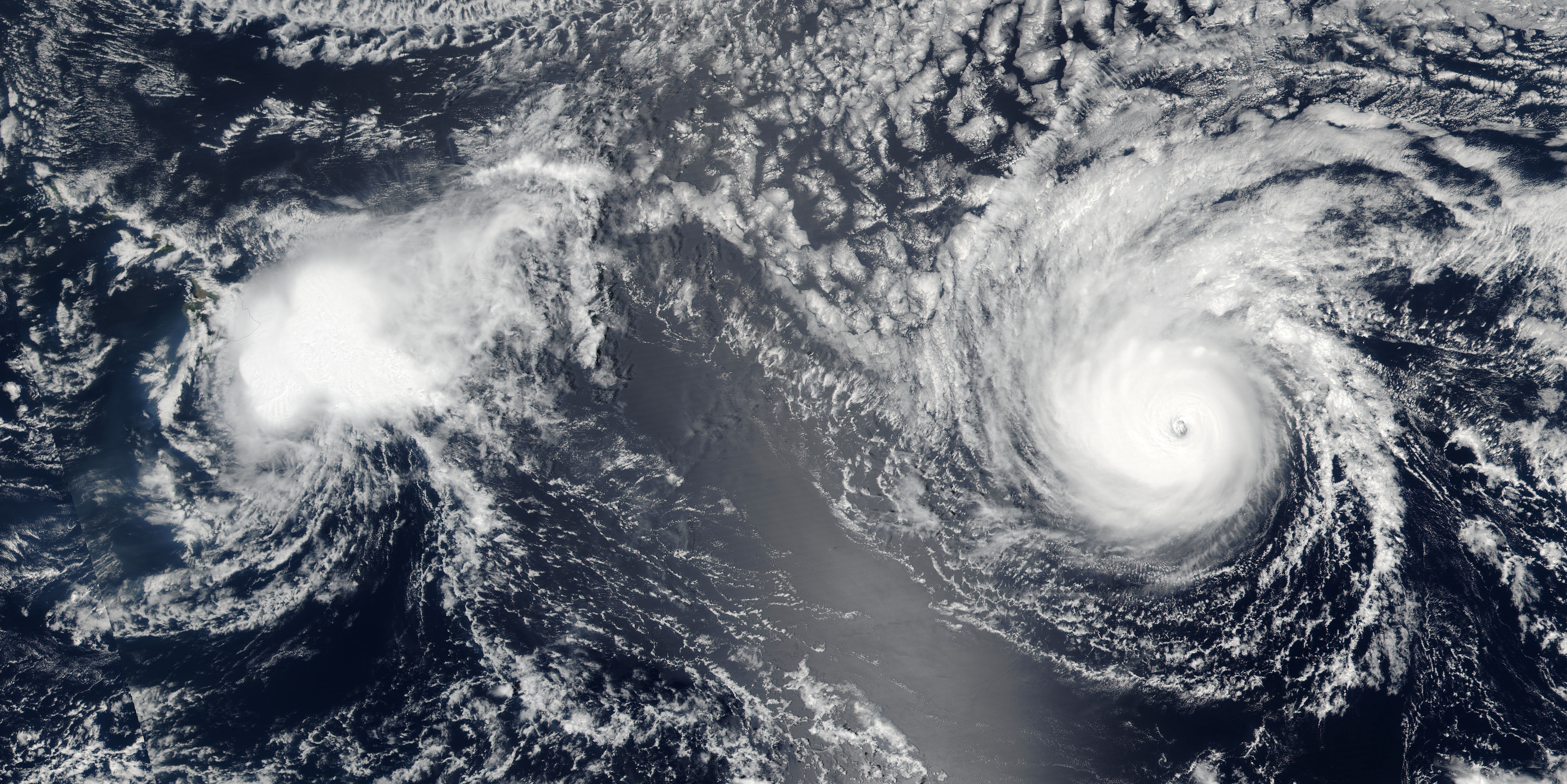
Both Madeline (left) and Lester (right) approaching Hawaii on August 31

- 00:00 UTC (5:00 p.m. PDT, August 30) – Hurricane Lester re-intensifies into a Category 4 hurricane about 1,245 mi (2,005 km) southeast of the Hawaiian Islands.
- 06:00 UTC (11:00 p.m. PDT, August 30) – Hurricane Lester attains its peak intensity with maximum sustained winds of 145 mph (235 km/h) and a minimum barometric pressure of 944 mbar (hPa; 27.88 inHg) about 1,175 mi (1,890 km) southeast of the Hawaiian Islands.

=== September ===
September 1

- 00:00 UTC (5:00 p.m. PDT, August 31) – Hurricane Lester weakens to a Category 3 hurricane about 935 mi (1,505 km) east-southeast of the Hawaiian Islands.
- 06:00 UTC (11:00 p.m. PDT, August 31) – Hurricane Lester weakens to a Category 2 hurricane about 865 mi (1,392 km) east-southeast of the Hawaiian Islands.

September 2

- 00:00 UTC (5:00 p.m. PDT, September 1) – Hurricane Lester re-intensifies to a Category 3 hurricane about 935 mi (1,505 km) east-southeast of the Hawaiian Islands.
- 12:00 UTC (5:00 a.m. PDT, September 1) – Hurricane Lester weakens to a Category 2 hurricane about 460 mi (740 km) east of the Hawaiian Islands.

September 3

- 18:00 UTC (8:00 a.m. HST) – Hurricane Lester weakens to a Category 1 hurricane about 120 mi (190 km) northeast of the Hawaiian Islands.

September 4

- 06:00 UTC (8:00 p.m. HST, September 3) – Hurricane Lester weakens to a tropical storm about 100 mi (160 km) northeast of the Hawaiian Islands.
- 12:00 UTC (7:00 a.m. CDT) – Tropical Depression Fifteen-E develops from an area of low pressure about 255 mi (410 km) south of Manzanillo, Mexico.
- 18:00 UTC (1:00 p.m. CDT) – Tropical Depression Fifteen-E intensifies into Tropical Storm Newton about 240 mi (385 km) south of Manzanillo, Mexico.

September 5

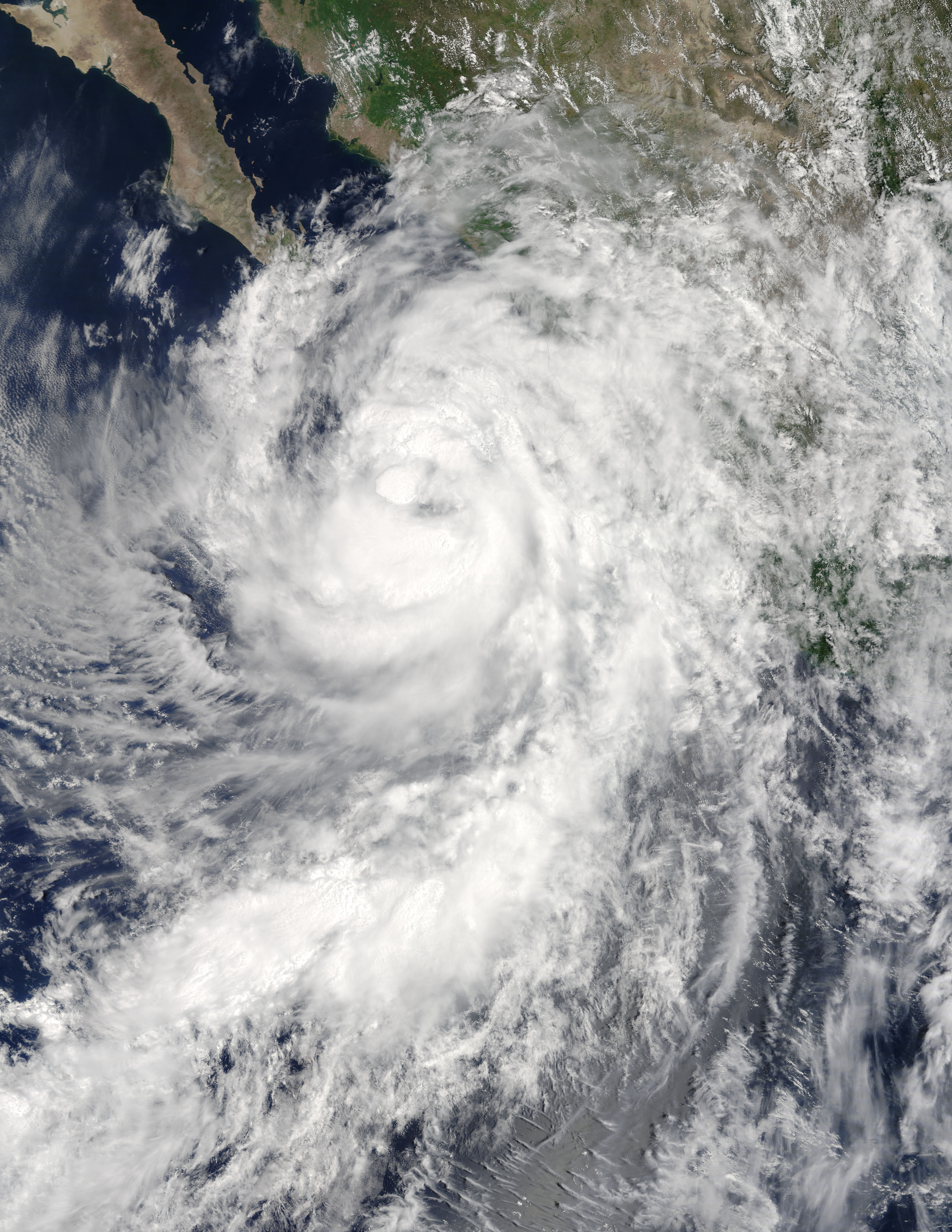
Newton shortly before being upgraded to a hurricane on September 5

- 18:00 UTC (12:00 p.m. MDT) – Tropical Storm Newton rapidly intensifies into a Category 1 hurricane about 130 mi (210 km) west-southwest of Cabo Corrientes, Mexico.

September 6

- 06:00 UTC (12:00 a.m. MDT) – Hurricane Newton attains its peak intensity with maximum sustained winds of 90 mph (145 km/h) and a minimum barometric pressure of 977 mbar (hPa; 28.85 inHg) about 60 mi (95 km) south-southeast of Cabo San Lucas, Mexico.
- 14:00 UTC (8:00 a.m. MDT) – Hurricane Newton makes its first landfall near El Cuñaño, Mexico, with winds of 85 mph (135 km/h).

September 7

- 06:00 UTC (12:00 a.m. MDT) – Hurricane Newton weakens to a tropical storm about 60 mi (95 km) west of Guaymas, Mexico.
- 08:30 UTC (2:30 a.m. MDT) – Tropical Storm Newton makes its second and final landfall about 15 mi (25 km) south of Bahía Kino, Mexico, with winds of 65 mph (105 km/h).
- 18:00 UTC (8:00 a.m. HST) – Tropical Storm Lester degenerates into a remnants area low pressure about 1,030 mi (1,660 km) south-southeast of the Aleutian Islands.
- 18:00 UTC (12:00 p.m. MDT) – Tropical Storm Newton degenerates into a remnant area of low pressure about 40 mi (65 km) southwest of Nogales, Arizona.

September 11

- 00:00 UTC (6:00 p.m. MDT, September 10) – Tropical Depression Sixteen-E develops from an area of low pressure about 805 mi (1,295 km) south-southwest of the Baja California peninsula.
- 06:00 UTC (11:00 p.m. MDT, September 10) – Tropical Depression Sixteen-E intensifies into Tropical Storm Orlene about 685 mi (1,105 km) southwest of the Baja California peninsula.

September 12

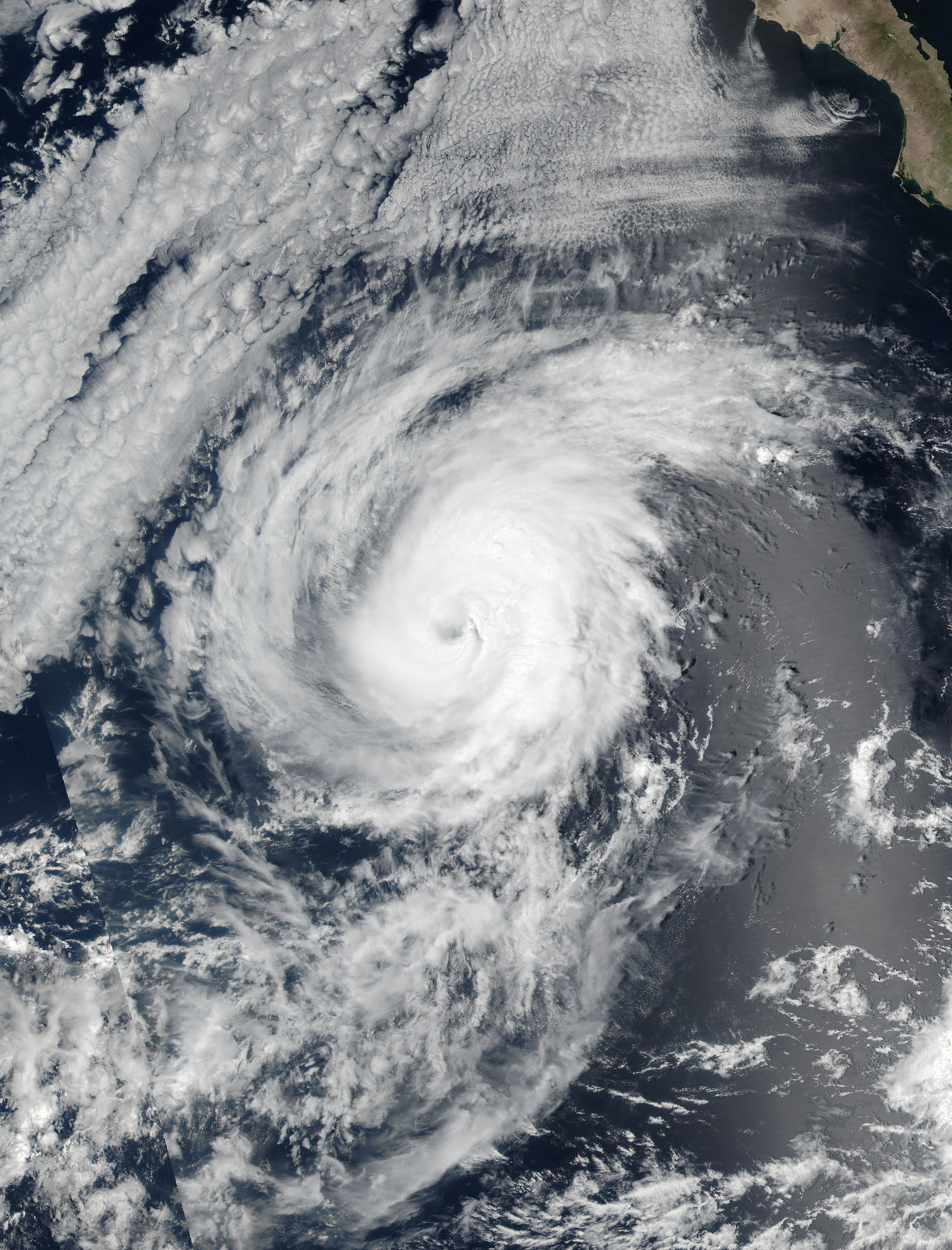
Hurricane Orlene at peak intensity on September 12

- 06:00 UTC (11:00 p.m. PDT, September 11) – Tropical Storm Orlene intensifies into a Category 1 hurricane about 705 mi (1,135 km) southwest of the Baja California peninsula.
- 18:00 UTC (11:00 a.m. PDT) – Hurricane Orlene intensifies into a Category 2 hurricane and simultaneously attains its peak intensity with maximum sustained winds of 110 mph (175 km/h) and a minimum barometric pressure of 967 mbar (hPa; 28.56 inHg) about 690 mi (1,110 km) southwest of the Baja California peninsula.

September 13

- 18:00 UTC (11:00 a.m. PDT) – Hurricane Orlene weakens to a Category 1 hurricane about 605 mi (975 km) west-southwest of the Baja California peninsula.

September 15

- 00:00 UTC (5:00 p.m. PDT, September 14) – Hurricane Orlene weakens to a tropical storm about 665 mi (1,070 km) west-southwest of the Baja California peninsula.
- 12:00 UTC (5:00 a.m. PDT) – Tropical Storm Orlene re-intensifies into a Category 1 hurricane about 765 mi (1,230 km) west-southwest of the Baja California peninsula.

September 16

- 00:00 UTC (5:00 p.m. PDT, September 15) – Hurricane Orlene weakens to a tropical storm for a second time about 880 mi (1,415 km) west-southwest of the Baja California peninsula.

September 17

- 00:00 UTC (5:00 p.m. PDT, September 16) – Tropical Storm Orlene degenerates to a remnant area of low pressure about 1,120 mi (1,800 km) west of the Baja California peninsula.

September 18

- 00:00 UTC (6:00 p.m. MDT, September 17) – Tropical Depression Seventeen-E develops from an area of low pressure about 375 mi (605 km) west-southwest of Manzanillo, Mexico.
- 06:00 UTC (12:00 a.m. MDT) – Tropical Depression Seventeen-E intensifies into Tropical Storm Paine about 410 mi (660 km) southwest of Manzanillo, Mexico.

September 19

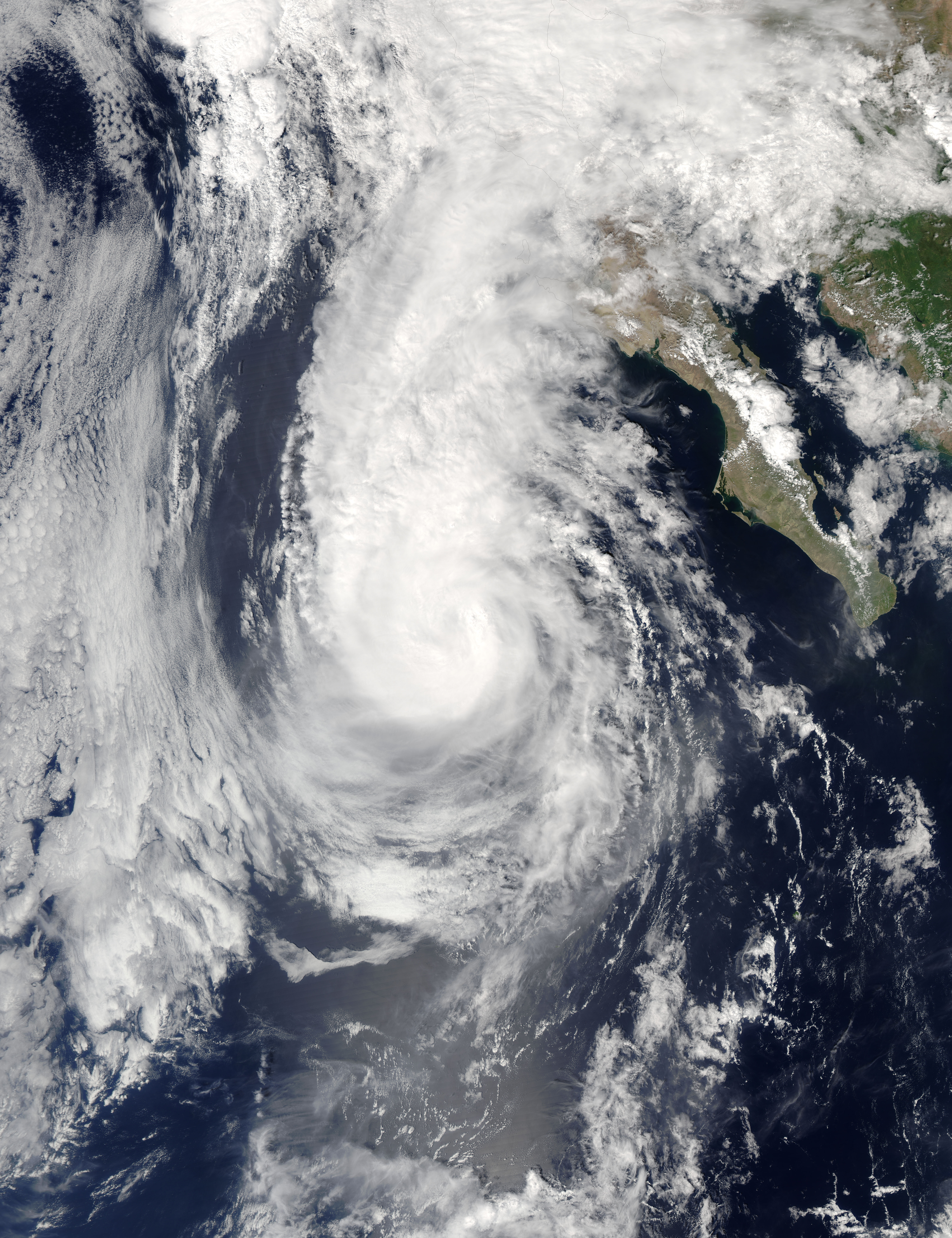
Hurricane Paine at peak intensity on September 19

- 06:00 UTC (12:00 a.m. MDT) – Tropical Storm Paine intensifies into a Category 1 hurricane about 345 mi (555 km) southwest of the Baja California peninsula.
- 18:00 UTC (11:00 a.m. PDT) – Hurricane Paine attains its peak intensity with maximum sustained winds of 90 mph (145 km/h) and a minimum barometric pressure of 979 mbar (hPa; 28.91 inHg) about 395 mi (635 km) west of the Baja California peninsula.

September 20

- 06:00 UTC (11:00 p.m. PDT, September 19) – Hurricane Paine weakens to a tropical storm about 425 mi (685 km) west of La Paz, Mexico.
- 18:00 UTC (11:00 a.m. PDT) – Tropical Storm Paine degenerates to a remnant area of low pressure about 145 mi (235 km) southwest of Punta Eugenia, Mexico.

=== October ===
October 23

- 06:00 UTC (11:00 p.m. PDT, October 22) – Tropical Depression Twenty-E develops from a tropical wave about 360 mi (580 km) south of Manzanillo, Mexico.
- 12:00 UTC (5:00 a.m. PDT) – Tropical Depression Twenty-E intensifies into Tropical Storm Seymour about 375 mi (604 km) southwest of Acapulco, Mexico.

October 24

- 12:00 UTC (5:00 a.m. PDT) – Tropical Storm Seymour intensifies into a Category 1 hurricane about 425 mi (684 km) southwest of Manzanillo, Mexico.

October 25

- 00:00 UTC (5:00 p.m. PDT, October 24) – Hurricane Seymour intensifies into a Category 2 hurricane about 240 mi (390 km) south-southwest of Socorro Island.
- 12:00 UTC (5:00 a.m. PDT) – Hurricane Seymour intensifies into a Category 3 hurricane about 195 mi (314 km) south-southeast of Clarion Island.
- 18:00 UTC (11:00 a.m. PDT) – Hurricane Seymour intensifies into a Category 4 hurricane about 200 mi (320 km) southwest of Clarion Island.

October 26

- 18:00 UTC (11:00 a.m. PDT) – Hurricane Seymour weakens to a Category 3 hurricane about 400 mi (640 km) west-southwest of Clarion Island.

October 27

- 00:00 UTC (5:00 p.m. PDT, October 26) – Hurricane Seymour weakens to a Category 2 hurricane about 440 mi (710 km) west of Clarion Island.
- 06:00 UTC (11:00 p.m. PDT, October 26) – Hurricane Seymour weakens to a Category 1 hurricane about 475 mi (764 km) west-northwest of Clarion Island.
- 18:00 UTC (11:00 a.m. PDT) – Hurricane Seymour weakens to a tropical storm about 565 mi (909 km) northwest of Clarion Island.

October 28

- 06:00 UTC (11:00 p.m. PDT, October 27) – Tropical Storm Seymour degenerates into a remnant low about 825 mi (1,328 km) west of the southern tip of the Baja California Peninsula.

=== November ===
November 13

- 06:00 UTC (12:00 a.m. MDT) – Tropical Storm Tina develops from an area of low pressure about 215 mi (345 km) southwest of Manzanillo, Mexico.
- 12:00 UTC (6:00 a.m. MDT) – Tropical Storm Tina attains its peak intensity with maximum sustained winds of 40 mph (65 km/h) and a minimum barometric pressure of 1004 mbar (hPa; 29.65 inHg) about 210 mi (340 km) southwest of Manzanillo, Mexico.

November 14

- 06:00 UTC (11:00 p.m. MST, November 13) – Tropical Storm Tina weakens to a tropical depression about 225 mi (360 km) west-southwest of Manzanillo, Mexico.
- 12:00 UTC (5:00 a.m. MST) – Tropical Depression Tina degenerates to a remnant area of low pressure about 260 mi (420 km) west of Manzanillo, Mexico.

November 25

- 03:30 UTC (10:30 p.m. CST) – Tropical Storm Otto enters the East Pacific basin near the Gulf of Papagayo in northwestern Costa Rica.

November 26

- 12:00 UTC (7:00 a.m. CST) – Tropical Storm Otto weakens to a tropical depression about 420 mi (675 km) southwest of San Salvador, El Salvador.
- 18:00 UTC (1:00 p.m. CST) – Tropical Depression Otto dissipates about 490 mi (790 km) south of Salina Cruz, Mexico.

November 30

- The 2016 Pacific hurricane season officially ends.

== See also ==
- List of Pacific hurricanes
- Timeline of the 2016 Atlantic hurricane season
- Timeline of the 2016 Pacific typhoon season
