= List of storms named Newton =

The name Newton has been used for five tropical cyclones in the Eastern Pacific Ocean.

- Tropical Storm Newton (1980) – approached western Mexico, but dissipated before making landfall
- Hurricane Newton (1986) – Category 1 hurricane that made landfall along both the western and eastern shores of the Gulf of California
- Tropical Storm Newton (1992) – did not affect land
- Hurricane Newton (2016) – Category 1 hurricane that made landfall on the Baja California peninsula
- Tropical Storm Newton (2022) – formed near southwestern Mexico and then moved out to sea
