= Hurricane Newton (2016) =

Category 1 Pacific hurricane in 2016

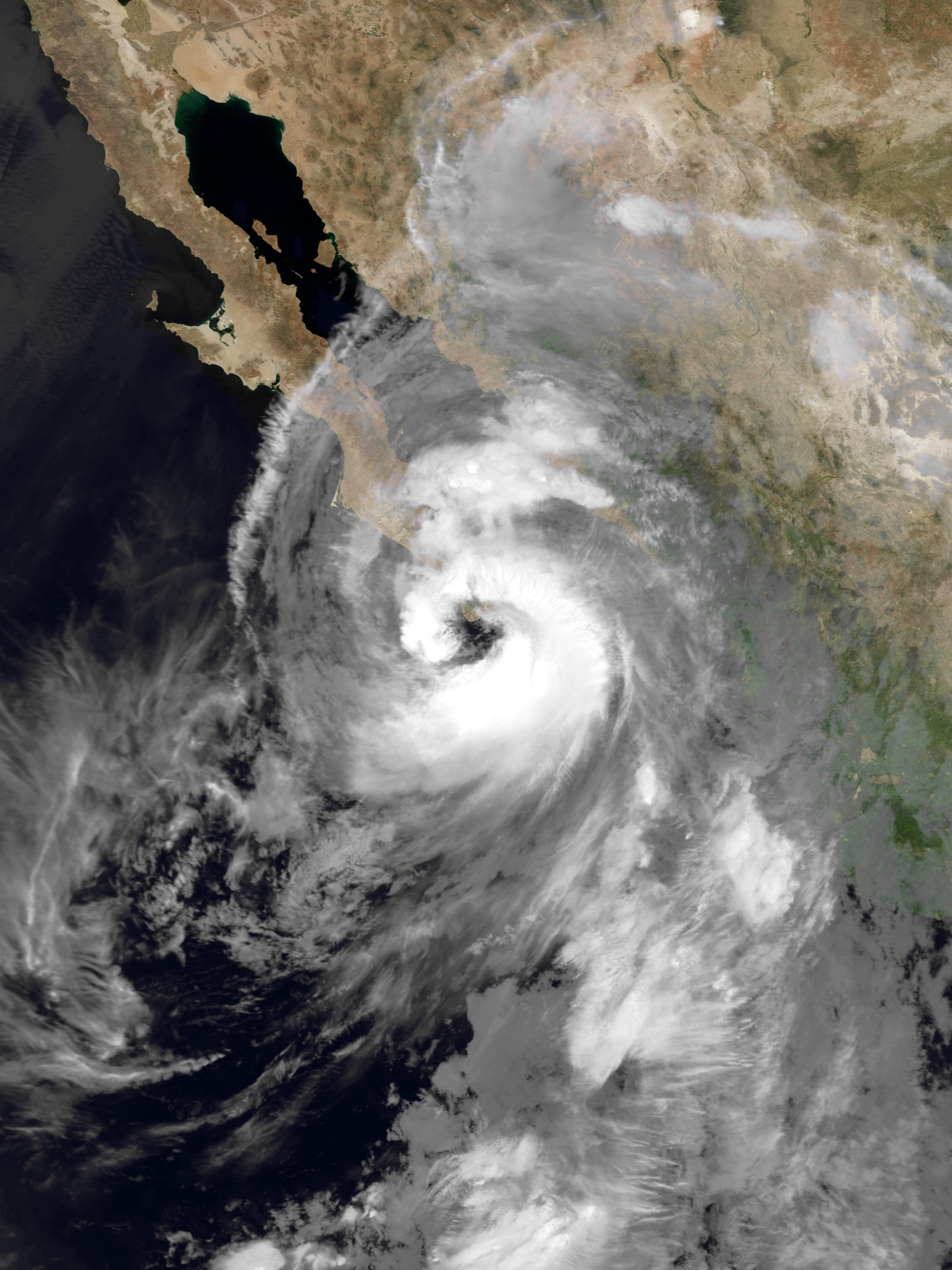
- Hurricane Newton at peak intensity while approaching Baja California Sur on September 6

Meteorological history
- Formed: September 4, 2016
- Remnant low: September 7, 2016
- Dissipated: September 8, 2016

Category 1 hurricane
- 1-minute sustained (SSHWS/NWS)
- Highest winds: 90 mph (150 km/h)
- Lowest pressure: 977 mbar (hPa); 28.85 inHg

Overall effects
- Fatalities: 12 total
- Damage: $95.8 million (2016 USD)
- Areas affected: Baja California Peninsula, Northwestern Mexico, Southwestern United States
- IBTrACS /
- Part of the 2016 Pacific hurricane season

Hurricane Newton was the first tropical cyclone to make landfall on the Baja California Peninsula at hurricane strength since Hurricane Odile in 2014. The fifteenth tropical depression, fifteenth named storm and ninth hurricane of the 2016 Pacific hurricane season, Newton formed from a tropical wave to the south of Mexico on September 4, 2016. Moving northwards through an environment conducive for additional development, Newton rapidly strengthened, reaching hurricane strength on the following day. Newton made landfall on the Baja California Peninsula just below peak strength on the same day. Interaction with the mountainous terrain of the peninsula caused some slight weakening, but Newton remained a hurricane until it entered the Gulf of California, at which time increasing wind shear caused Newton to weaken at a faster pace, and the system made landfall in Sonora late on September 6 as a strong tropical storm. The cyclone continued to rapidly weaken over the rugged terrain of Sonora, and it degenerated into a remnant low just south of the Mexico–United States border on September 7. The remnants of Newton dissipated early on the following day.

In advance of Newton's arrival, authorities in Mexico took several steps to ensure the safety of residents, tourists as well as property. A large number of watches and warnings were issued for various parts of Mexico. In Baja California Sur, ports and airports were closed before the storm, several evacuation centers were opened for stranded tourists and residents, military personnel were deployed, and policemen deployed to prevent post-storm looting. Heavy rains and strong winds from Newton and its outer bands wrought widespread damage in western Mexico. Several communities were flooded across many states, which led authorities to rescue stranded people from them. Thousands of houses were also damaged due to rainfall. Near the location of landfall, the storm led to loss of power and access to drinking water while other communities were isolated due to damage to road infrastructure. In the Gulf of California, a shrimp boat capsized due to rough seas, leading to five deaths. The post-tropical remnants of Newton later brought heavy rain to the Southeastern United States, leading to minor damage. Overall, Newton caused $95.8 million (2016 USD) in damage and 12 deaths.

== Meteorological history ==
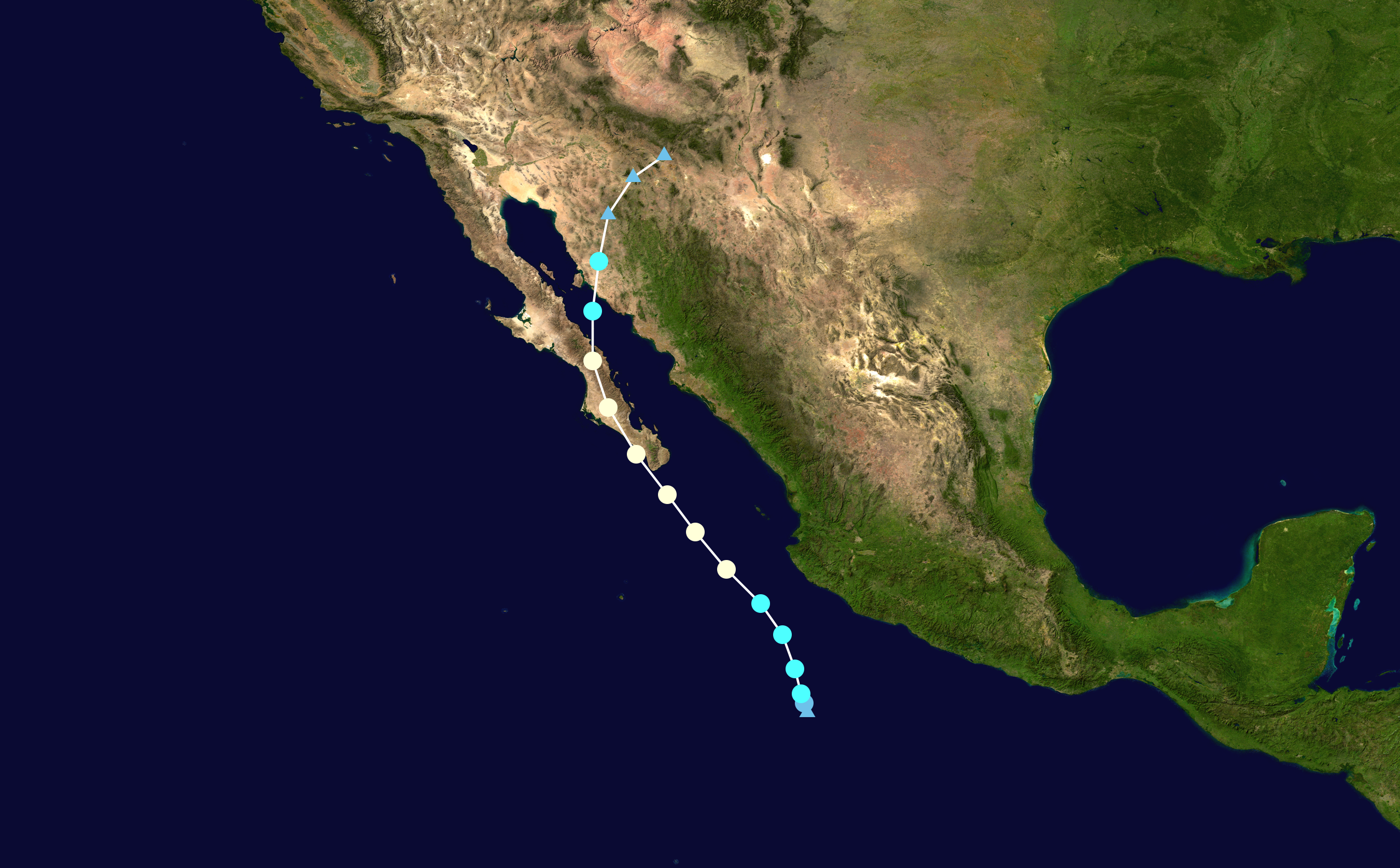
Map plotting the storm's track and intensity, according to the Saffir–Simpson scale Map key Saffir–Simpson scale Tropical depression (≤38 mph, ≤62 km/h) Tropical storm (39–73 mph, 63–118 km/h) Category 1 (74–95 mph, 119–153 km/h) Category 2 (96–110 mph, 154–177 km/h) Category 3 (111–129 mph, 178–208 km/h) Category 4 (130–156 mph, 209–251 km/h) Category 5 (≥157 mph, ≥252 km/h) Unknown Storm type Tropical cyclone Subtropical cyclone Extratropical cyclone, remnant low, tropical disturbance, or monsoon depression

The origins of Newton can be traced to a tropical wave that crossed the west coast of Africa on August 25, 2016. Though the wave initially had some deep convection, the showers and thunderstorms associated with it decreased significantly after it emerged over the Atlantic Ocean. The National Hurricane Center first mentioned the possibility of tropical cyclogenesis of the wave on August 28. The wave traversed the tropical Atlantic quickly, reaching the Lesser Antilles the following day and Central America on September 1, finally moving into the vicinity of a surface trough located to south of the coast of Mexico on September 3. A low pressure area developed within the wave early on September 4, and associated deep convection became sufficiently organised for the system to be classified as a tropical depression at 12:00 UTC that day. Operationally, the NHC did not initiate advisories until nine hours later. Six hours after formation, the depression strengthened into a tropical storm, whereupon it was assigned the name Newton. At the time of formation, Newton was located along the periphery of a mid-tropospheric ridge extending across the Gulf of Mexico and northern Mexico, with a surface trough covering the western United States and extending southwestward over the Pacific Ocean. This steering pattern caused Newton to move northwards, slowly at first, accelerating as it approached the trough.

Located over warm (30 °C) waters and in a favorable environment characterized by minimal deep-layer wind shear, Newton underwent a 36-hour period of rapid intensification between 1800 UTC on September 4 and 0600 UTC on September 6. Data from an Air Force Hurricane Hunter flight late on 5 September indicated that Newton attained hurricane strength at 1800 UTC that day while located 130 miles (210 km) west-southwest of Cabo Corrientes, Mexico. The storm continued to strengthen after the plane departed the storm — objective Dvorak estimates continued to increase after the mission — and the NHC estimated that Newton attained peak intensity with maximum one-minute sustained winds of 90 miles per hour (145 km/h) and a minimum central pressure of 977 millibars (28.9 inHg) at 0600 UTC on September 6.

The northern and eastern parts of Newton's eyewall struck the southern tip of the Baja California Peninsula a few hours after peak intensity, and the center of the storm passed just a few miles offshore of Cabo San Lucas. Newton weakened slightly as its eastern eyewall passed over the mountainous terrain of Baja California Sur, and made landfall near El Cuñaño on the western side of the peninsula with estimated sustained winds of 85 miles per hour (135 km/h) and a minimum central pressure of 979 millibars (28.9 inHg) at 1400 UTC on that day. Passage over the Baja California Peninsula caused Newton to weaken gradually throughout the day, and its convection became increasingly asymmetric and displaced to the north. The storm, however, maintained hurricane strength over land, and, as indicated by microwave imagery around 0000 UTC on September 7, redeveloped a closed eyewall after emerging over the warm waters of the Gulf of California. This trend proved to be short-lived: increasing deep-layer wind shear caused Newton to weaken into a tropical storm by 0600 UTC about 60 miles (95 km) west of Guaymas. Two and a half hours later, Newton made its second and final landfall just south of Bahía de Kino in the state of Sonora with estimated winds of 65 miles per hour (105 km/h) and a central pressure of 998 millibars (29.5 inHg). The cyclone continued to rapidly weaken under the influence of increasing shear and rugged terrain, and lost all its deep convection later that day. Newton degenerated into a remnant low by 1800 UTC just south of the Mexico–United States border, about 40 miles (64 km) southwest of Nogales, Arizona. The remnants turned northeast and dissipated near the Arizona-Mexico border soon after 0600 UTC on September 8.

== Preparations ==
The Government of Mexico issued a hurricane watch for the Baja California Peninsula between Cabo San Lázaro and San Evaristo on September 4 following the formation of Tropical Depression Fifteen-E. When the depression was upgraded to a tropical storm six hours later, the watch was upgraded to a hurricane warning and extended till La Paz. Simultaneously, watches and warnings were issued for various parts of the Baja California Peninsula as well as mainland Mexico. By early on September 5, large parts of the coasts of the Mexican states of Sinaloa, Sonora, and Baja California Sur were under tropical cyclone watches and warnings, which were discontinued gradually as Newton moved inland and weakened. All watches and warnings were discontinued by 2100 UTC on September 5 as Newton lost strength over Sonora.

During the afternoon of September 5, authorities issued a "yellow" alert in southern Jalisco, "green" alert for the state of Baja California Sur, Sinaloa, northern and central Jalisco, Nayarit, Colima, and Michoacan. A blue alert was declared in Guerrero and Baja California. Classes were suspended in Colima, in three municipalities in northern Jalisco, in Baja California Sur, and in Mazatlan. Around 14,000 tourists remained in Los Cabos as airlines cancelled flights ahead of Newton. Tourists were advised to stay in their hotels. Another 1,500 people took shelter in Los Cabos, while authorities opened shelters across Baja California Sur with a total capacity of 16,000. More than a third of the flights at Los Cabos International Airport were cancelled. The Third Military Zone in La Paz deployed 800 military personnel to throughout Baja California Sur to protect citizens from the advancing storm. At the same time, plans were activated to safeguard tourists in the state. The port of Los Cabos was closed by 7 p.m. on September 5, while the ports of La Paz, Loreto, Santa Rosalía and Comondú closed at midnight. Local airports were closed late on the same day, and small boats were barred from using local ports. Boat owners pulled fishing craft from water and business owners nailed boards and sheets of plywood to windows in Cabo San Lucas. Officials evacuated low-lying areas and opened 18 shelters in schools in Los Cabos and Cabo San Lucas, as well as 38 others elsewhere in Baja California Sur, while warning people against panic buying. Police officers were deployed at shopping malls to prevent looting as had occurred in the aftermath of Hurricane Odile in 2014.

== Impact ==
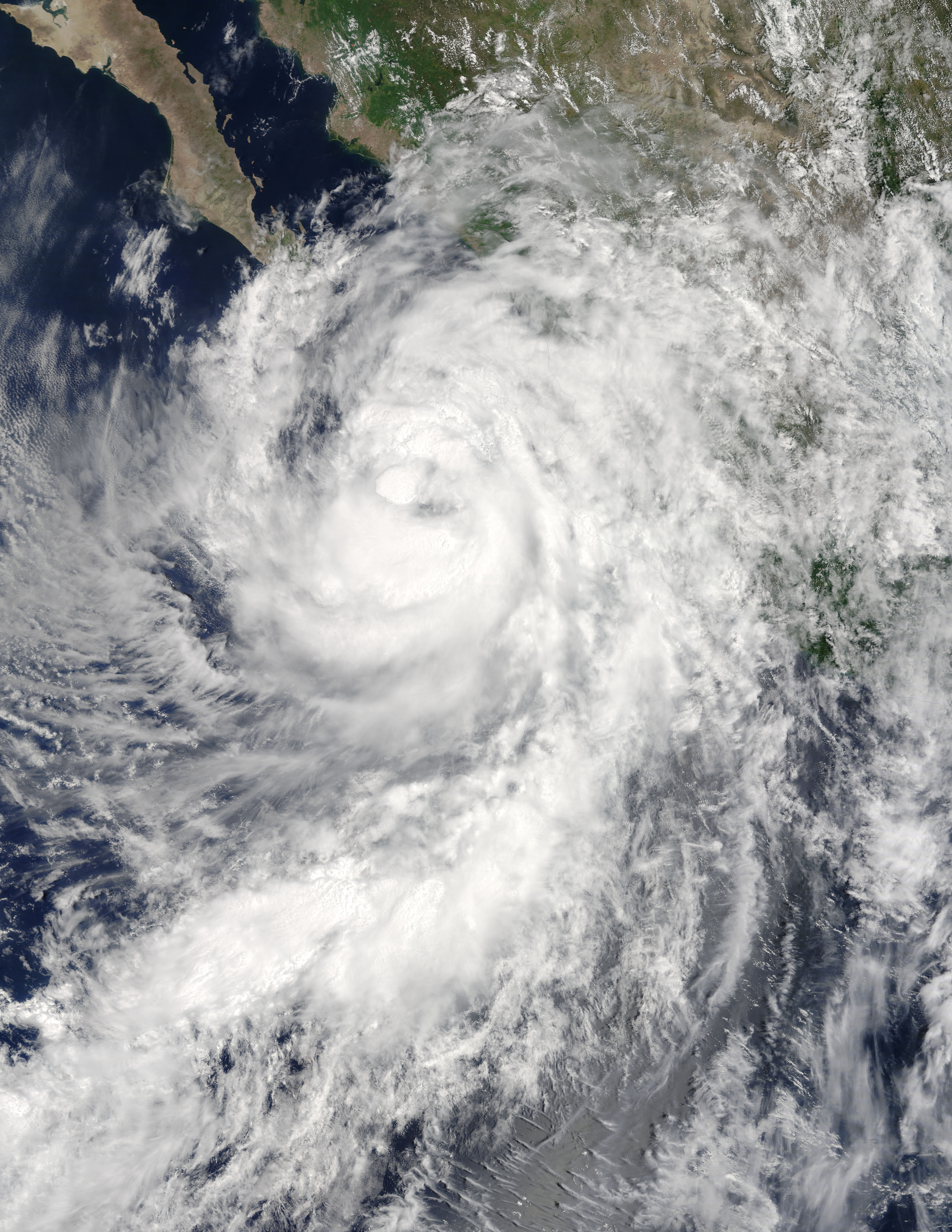
Newton near hurricane status and approaching Baja California on September 5

The outer rainbands of Hurricane Newton brought heavy rains to Guerrero and Chiapas that resulted in flooding. Across Chiapas, three people were killed and two others were reported missing. In the capital city of Tuxtla, almost 900 homes were damaged and six were demolished, leaving 3,500 displaced. In Guerrero, a total of 695 homes were flooded and 12 communities were isolated. Due to the flooding, officials evacuated about 150 people in seven shelters. Due to the flooding in Guerrero, 817 troops, 25 radio stations, 24 first aid kits, and 124 automobiles were dispatched for cleanup. In Petatlan, two people were swept away in a river; one was found alive, while the other died. Seventy homes were damaged and 200 people were trapped in the resort town of Acapulco, prompting air evacuations via police, marines and the army. Further north, severe flooding was reported in Colima and Jalisco. Two rivers overflowed, resulting in several communities being isolated. The communities of El Sentinel and El Rebalse were the worst affected by the storm. Several people sought shelter in schools and other public spaces. Statewide, 20 families were evacuated because of flooding.

While damage near the landfall location was minor, the hurricane's heavy rains deluged the municipality of Mulege. There, power and drinking water access was lost. In the municipality's seat of Santa Rosalia, dozens of houses and vehicles were buried in rocks and debris. Nearby, the communities of San Ignacio and Herocina Mulege were cut off from the outside world due to damage to the Mexican Federal Highway 1. Five people were arrested for trying to loot two convenience stores in Los Cabos. Offshore, in the Gulf of California, a shrimp boat capsized due to rough seas, resulting in five people being swept away. Two dead bodies were later found ashore while the other three were briefly missing. before being reported dead on September 8. Damage across Baja California Sur reached 700 million pesos (US$37 million). Guaymas suffered extensive impacts from the hurricane, with more than 3,000 homes damaged. Total losses in the municipality reached 1.1 billion pesos (US$58 million).

The remnants of Newton brought heavy rainfall to the southwestern United States, peaking at 5.67 in (144 mm) at Miller Carr Canyon in southeastern Arizona. Precipitation reached 3.43 in (87 mm) near Texico, New Mexico, the highest in that state. Losses in Kansas were at US$752,100.

== See also ==
- Weather of 2016
- Tropical cyclones in 2016
- List of Category 1 Pacific hurricanes
- Other tropical cyclones named Newton
- List of Baja California Peninsula hurricanes
- List of Arizona hurricanes
- List of New Mexico hurricanes
- Hurricane Henriette (2007)
- Tropical Storm Lidia (2017)
- Hurricane Nora (1997)
