= Timeline of the 2016 Pacific typhoon season =

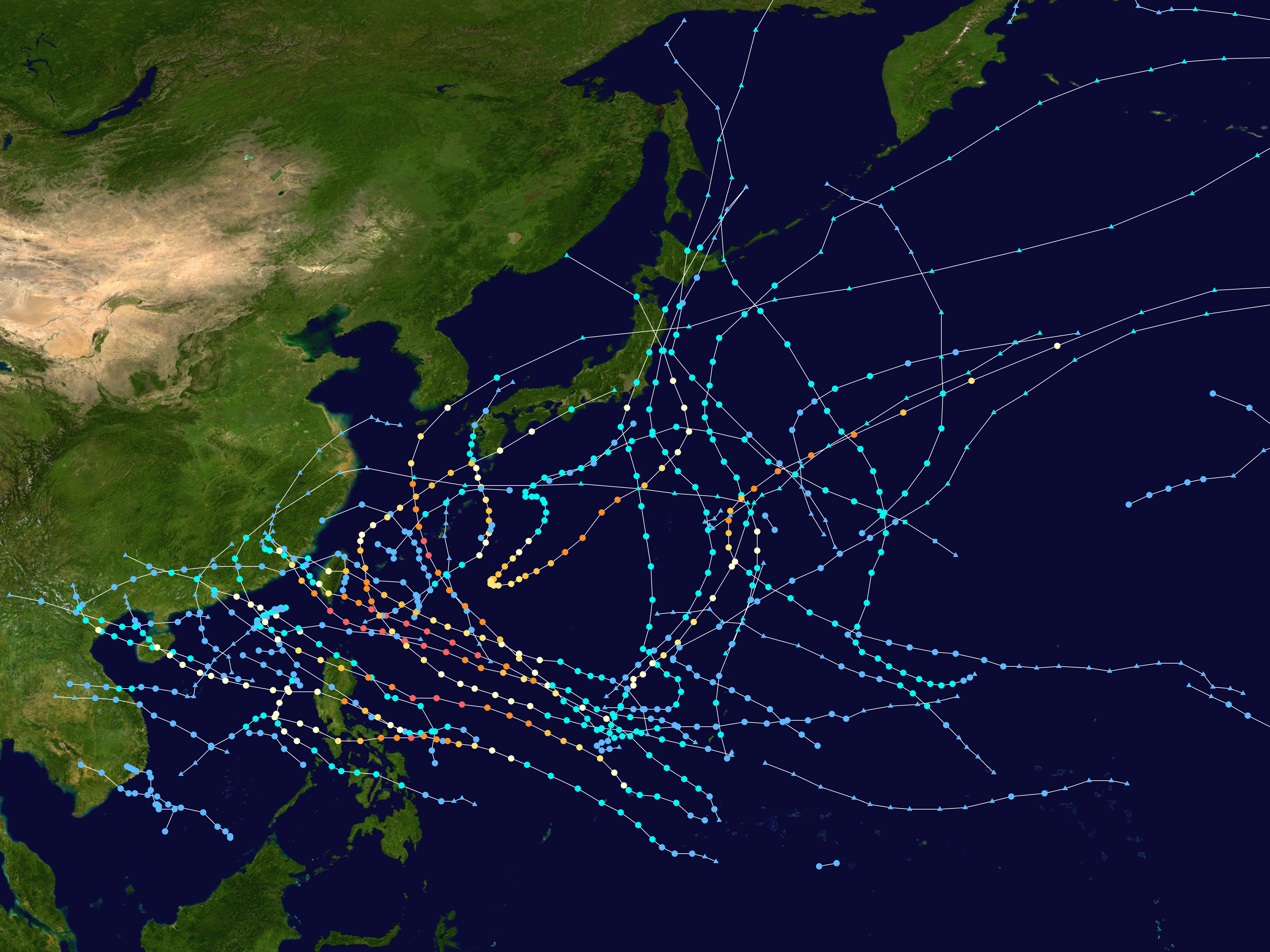
- Season summary map

Season boundaries
- First system formed: May 25, 2016
- Last system dissipated: December 28, 2016

Strongest system
- Name: Meranti
- Maximum winds: 220 km/h (140 mph) (10-minute sustained)
- Lowest pressure: 890 hPa (mbar)

Longest lasting system
- Name: Lionrock
- Duration: 13.5 days
Storm articles
- Typhoon Nepartak
- Tropical Storm Mirinae (2016)
- Tropical Storm Nida (2016)
- Tropical Storm Dianmu (2016)
- Typhoon Mindulle (2016)
- Typhoon Lionrock
- Typhoon Meranti
- Tropical Storm Rai (2016)
- Typhoon Malakas (2016)
- Typhoon Megi (2016)
- Typhoon Chaba (2016)
- Typhoon Songda (2016)
- Tropical Storm Aere (2016)
- Typhoon Sarika
- Typhoon Haima
- November 2016 Vietnam tropical depression
- Typhoon Nock-ten

This timeline documents all of the events of the 2016 Pacific typhoon season. Most of the tropical cyclones forming between May and November. The scope of this article is limited to the Pacific Ocean, north of the equator between 100°E and the International Date Line. Tropical storms that form in the entire Western Pacific basin are assigned a name by the Japan Meteorological Agency. Tropical depressions that form in this basin are given a number with a "W" suffix by the United States' Joint Typhoon Warning Center. In addition, the Philippine Atmospheric, Geophysical and Astronomical Services Administration (PAGASA) assigns names to tropical cyclones (including tropical depressions) that enter or form in the Philippine area of responsibility. These names, however, are not in common use outside of the Philippines.

During the season, 51 systems were designated as tropical depressions by either, the Japan Meteorological Agency (JMA), the Philippine Atmospheric, Geophysical and Astronomical Services Administration (PAGASA), the Joint Typhoon Warning Center (JTWC), or other National Meteorological and Hydrological Services such as the China Meteorological Administration and the Hong Kong Observatory. As they run the Regional Specialized Meteorological Centre for the Western Pacific, the JMA assigns names to tropical depressions should they intensify into a tropical storm. PAGASA also assign local names to tropical depressions which form within their area of responsibility; however, these names are not in common use outside of PAGASA's area of responsibility. In this season, 14 systems entered or formed in the Philippine Area of Responsibility (PAR), in which 7 of them made landfall over the Philippines.

== Timeline ==
=== January – April ===
- No tropical cyclones form in the basin during the first four months of 2016.

January 1

- 00:00 UTC — The 2016 Pacific typhoon season officially begins.

=== May ===
May 25

- 18:00 UTC at 16.2°N 113.7°E — A tropical depression forms in the South China Sea.

May 26

- 12:00 UTC at 19.1°N 113.6°E — After re-analysis, the JTWC follows suit and identifies the tropical depression in the South China Sea as Tropical Depression 01W.

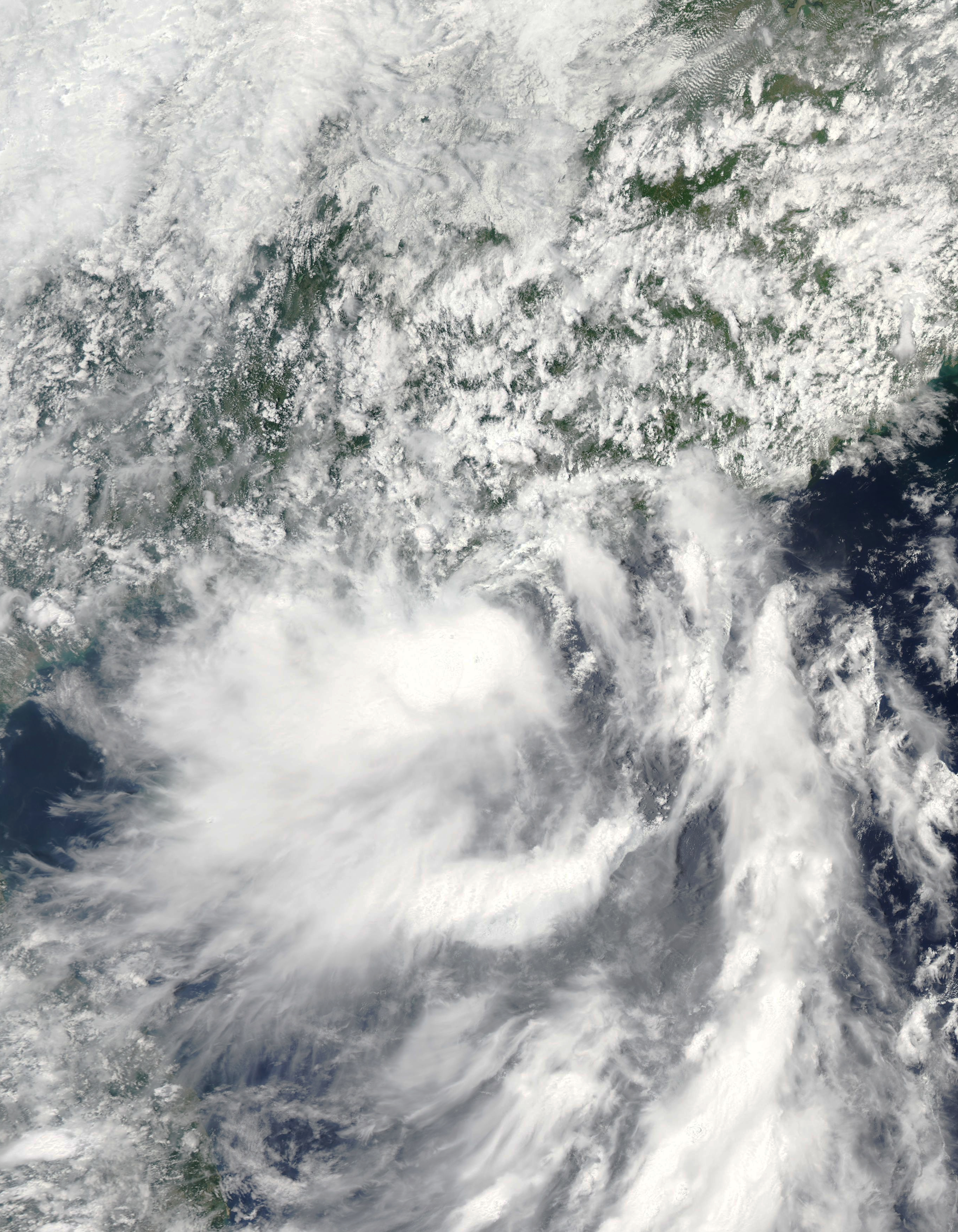
Tropical Depression 01W hours before landfall on May 27

May 27

- 06:00 UTC at 21.3°N 112.3°E — The JMA assesses Tropical Depression 01W has attained a central pressure of minimum pressure of 1000 hPa as it was about to make landfall in Southern China.
- 06:00 UTC at 21.4°N 112.6°E — Tropical Depression 01W reaches its peak intensity with 1-minute sustained winds of 30 knots (56 km/h; 35 mph). The agency also last notes the system as it weakens to a disturbance six hours later.
- 09:40 UTC (17:40 CST) at 21.6°N 112.2°E — Tropical Depression 01W makes landfall near Yangjiang, Guangdong
- 18:00 UTC at 23.7°N 112.6°E — The JMA last notes Tropical Depression 01W as it weakens inland China; the system merged with a stationary front six hours later.

=== June ===
June 22

- 18:00 UTC at 11.8°N 119.1°E — A tropical depression develops in the South China Sea near Palawan.

June 23

- 06:00 UTC at 13.6°N 117.3°E — The JMA analyzes the tropical depression in the South China Sea having at 10-minute sustained winds of 30 knots (56 km/h; 35 mph).
- 12:00 UTC at 13.8°N 116.4°E — The tropical depression in the South China Sea also attains a minimum pressure of 1006 hPa.

June 24

- 00:00 UTC at 14.9°N 115.1°E — The tropical depression in the South China Sea weakens to a low-pressure area as it moved further westward.

June 25

- 18:00 UTC at 13.3°N 127.9°E — A tropical depression develops in the Philippine Sea northeast of Samar. The JMA assesses the system having a central pressure of 1008 hPa.

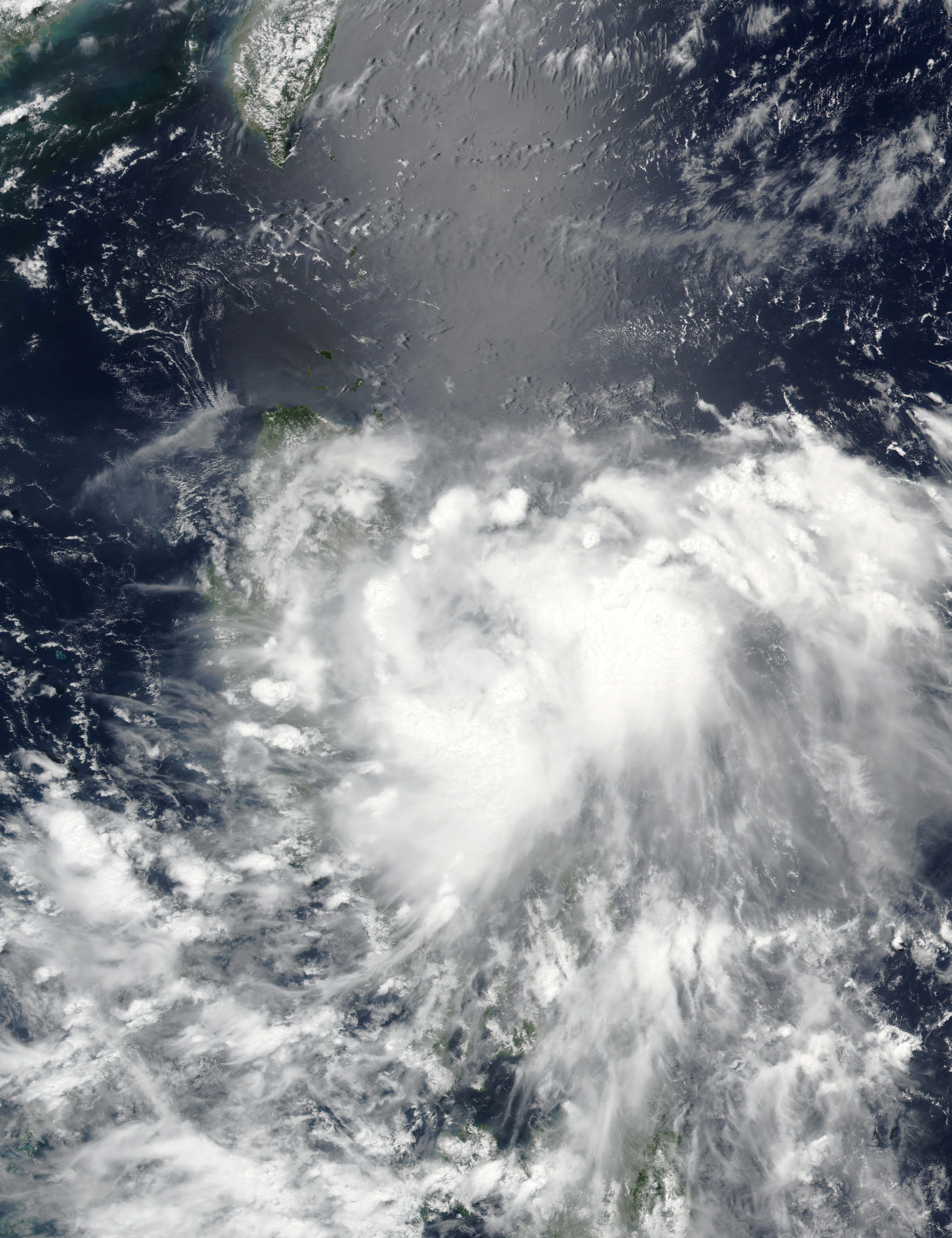
Tropical Depression Ambo nearing landfall on June 26

June 26

- 00:00 UTC at 13.9°N 125.5°E — The JMA assesses the tropical depression over the Philippine Sea has attained 10-minute sustained winds of 30 knots (56 km/h; 35 mph), now east of Luzon.
- 00:00 UTC at (08:00 PHT) at 13.5°N 126.1°E — The Philippine Atmospheric, Geophysical and Astronomical Services Administration (PAGASA) designates the tropical depression over the Philippine Sea as Ambo with 10-minute sustained winds of 45 kilometres per hour (24 kn; 28 mph), located about to the east of Bicol Region.
- 06:00 UTC at 14.8°N 123.4°E — The JMA analyzes Ambo having attained a lower central pressure of 1006 hPa.
- 16:30 UTC (00:30 PHT, June 27) at 16.1°N 121.77°E — Tropical Depression Ambo makes landfall in Dinalungan, Aurora.
- 18:00 UTC (02:00 PHT, June 27) at 17.0°N 121.0°E — The PAGASA reports Tropical Depression Ambo has weakened to a low-pressure area over Quirino.

June 27

- 00:00 UTC at 18.1°N 118.7°E — The JMA notes Tropical Depression Ex-Ambo enters the South China Sea.
- 06:00 UTC at 19.4°N 117.6°E— The JMA assesses Tropical Depression Ex-Ambo has reached a lower central pressure of 1004 hPa.

June 28

- 00:00 UTC (08:00 CST) at 22.5°N 113.5°E — The JMA last notes Tropical Depression Ex-Ambo as it makes landfall over in Guangdong; the system was absorbed by a stationary front six hours later.

=== July ===
July 2

- 12:00 UTC at 8.3°N 145.1°E — A tropical depression develops approximately 780 km (480 mi) to the southeast of Yap State.

July 3

- 00:00 UTC at 8.9°N 144.9°E — The tropical depression southeast of Yap State intensifies into a tropical storm, with the JMA naming it as Nepartak.
- 00:00 UTC at 9.0°N 145.0°E — The JTWC starts tracking Nepartak as a tropical depression, designating it as 02W.
- 12:00 UTC at 10.3°N 144.0°E — The JTWC upgrades Nepartak to a tropical storm as it was located about 47 nmi (54 mi; 87 km) northeast of Faraulep.

July 4

- 12:00 UTC at 13.5°N 139.6°E — Nepartak intensifies into a severe tropical storm by the JMA as it continues its northwestward track.
- 18:00 UTC at 14.7°N 138.2°E — The JTWC reports Nepartak has intensified to a Category 1 typhoon.

July 5

- 00:00 UTC at 15.3°N 136.6°E — According to the JMA, Nepartak strengthens into a typhoon.
- 06:00 UTC at 16.3°N 135.0°E — Typhoon Nepartak intensifies into a Category 2 typhoon.
- 06:00 UTC (14:00 PHT) at 16.2°N 135.0°E — The PAGASA reports Typhoon Nepartak had entered the PAR and was named Butchoy.
- 12:00 UTC at 17.1°N 133.6°E — Typhoon Nepartak (Butchoy) undergoes rapid deepening to a Category 4 typhoon and is nearing super-typhoon status located about 821 nmi (945 mi; 1,520 km) east-southeast of Taipei, Taiwan.
- 18:00 UTC at 18.0°N 131.9°E — The JTWC reports Nepartak (Butchoy) has further strengthened into a super-typhoon (Note: A super typhoon is an unofficial category used by the Joint Typhoon Warning Center (JTWC) for a typhoon with winds of at least 130 kn (240 km/h; 150 mph).) as it traverses the Philippine Sea, similarly reported by PAGASA (Note: Since March 23, 2022, PAGASA has defined a super-typhoon as a tropical cyclone with maximum 10-minute sustained winds of ≥185 kilometres per hour (100 kn; 51 m/s; 115 mph).) at 02:00 PHT on July 6.

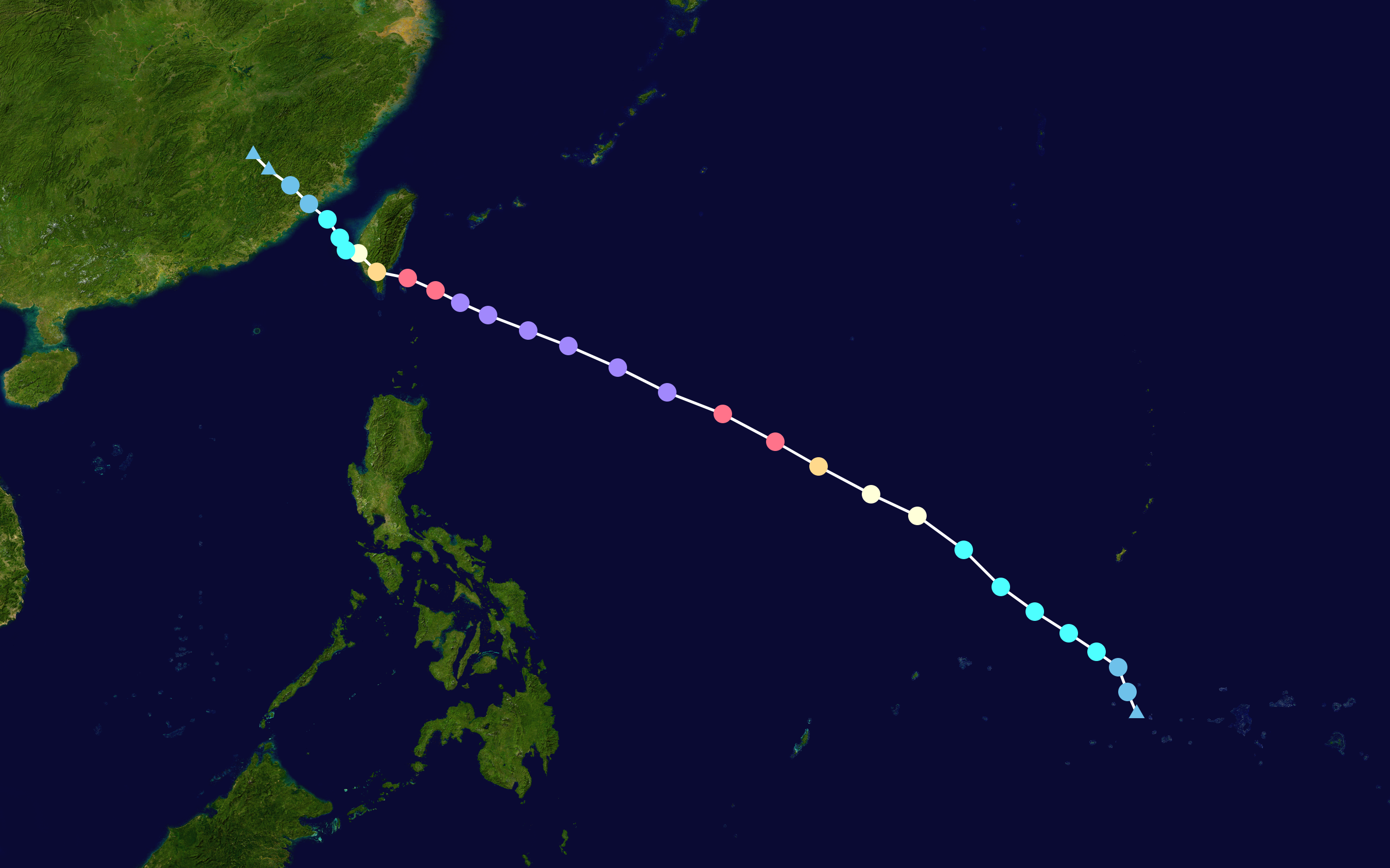
Track of Nepartak during early July

July 6

- 00:00 UTC at 18.7°N 130.1°E — Super Typhoon Nepartak (Butchoy) further reaches Category 5 super typhoon intensity from the JTWC as it was approximately located 613 nmi (705 mi; 1,135 km) southeast of Taipei, Taiwan.
- 06:00 UTC at 19.5°N 128.4°E — The JMA assesses that Nepartak (Butchoy) reached its peak intensity with 10-minute sustained winds of 110 knots (200 km/h; 130 mph) and a minimum barometric pressure of 900 hPa (26.87 inHg).
- 06:00 at 19.5°N 128.5°E — Super Typhoon Nepartak (Butchoy) reaches peak intensity from the JTWC with 1-minute sustained winds of 155 knots (287 km/h; 178 mph) about 348 nmi (400 mi; 644 km) southeast of Taipei, Taiwan.
- 12:00 UTC (20:00 PHT) at 20.1°N 126.9°E — Super Typhoon Nepartak (Butchoy) reaches peak intensity from PAGASA with 10-minute sustained winds of 220 kilometres per hour (120 kn; 140 mph) about 465 km (289 mi; 465 km) east of Basco, Batanes.

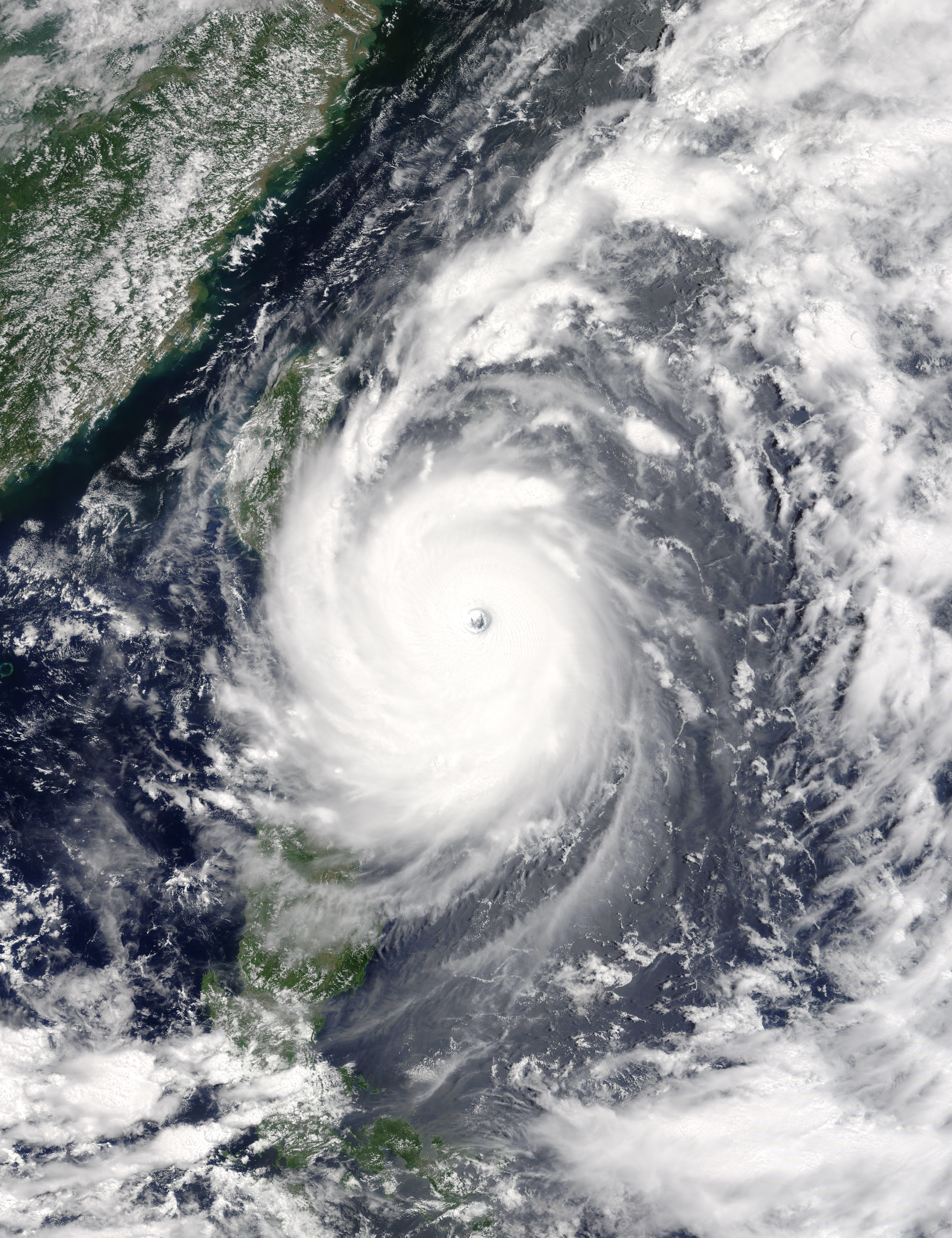
Nepartak closing in on Taiwan on July 7

July 7

- 12:00 UTC at 22.0°N 122.6°E — Super Typhoon Nepartak (Butchoy) weakens to a Category 4 super typhoon as it closes it on Taiwan.
- 18:00 UTC at 22.4°N 121.7°E — The JTWC reports that Nepartak (Butchoy) weakened below super typhoon status.
- 21:50 UTC (05:50 TST, July 8) at 22.4°N 121.0°E — Typhoon Nepartak (Butchoy) makes landfall over in Taimali, Taitung.
- 22:00 UTC at 22.6°N 121.0°E – Typhoon Nepartak (Butchoy) further weakens to a Category 3 typhoon.

July 8

- 00:00 UTC at 22.6°N 120.7°E — Nepartak (Butchoy) weakens to a Category 2 typhoon about 155 nmi (178 mi; 287 km) south-southwest of Taipei, Taiwan.
- 00:00 UTC (08:00 PHT) at 22.6°N 120.5°E —The PAGASA downgrades Nepartak (Butchoy) to a typhoon.
- 06:00 UTC at 23.2°N 120.1°E — Typhoon Nepartak (Butchoy) further weakens to a minimal Category 1 about 149 nmi (171 mi; 276 km) to the southwest of Taipei, Taiwan as it emerges on Taiwan Strait.
- 06:00 (14:00 PHT) at 23.3°N 120.0°E — The PAGASA reports Typhoon Nepartak (Butchoy) has left the PAR after crossing Taiwan.
- 12:00 UTC at 23.2°N 119.9°E — The JMA downgrades Nepartak to a severe tropical storm.
- 12:00 UTC at 23.3°N 119.7°E — The JTWC further downgrades Nepartak to a tropical storm.
- 18:00 UTC at 23.4°N 119.8°E — Severe Tropical Storm Nepartak weakens into a tropical storm by the JMA.

July 9

- 05:45 UTC (13:45 CST) at 24.4°N 118.4°E — Tropical Storm Nepartak makes landfall over in Shishi, Fujian in China.
- 06:00 UTC at 24.8°N 118.5°E — Tropical Storm Nepartak weakens into a tropical depression by the JMA.
- 06:00 UTC at 24.8°N 118.6°E — The JTWC follows suit and downgrades Nepartak to a tropical depression as well.
- 12:00 UTC at 25.4°N 117.9°E — The JTWC last notes Tropical Depression Nepartak as it weakens and moves further inland.

July 10

- 00:00 UTC at 26.4°N 116.7°E — The JMA last notes Tropical Depression Nepartak as it weakens over land; the system dissipates six hours later.

July 15

- 00:00 UTC at 15.3°N 140.2°E ― The JMA marks another tropical depression near the Northern Mariana Islands.
- 06:00 UTC at 15.7°N 138.6°E ― The tropical depression attains central pressure slightly drops to 1006 hPa as it moves west-northwest.

July 16

- 00:00 UTC at 17.0°N 134.4°E — The tropical depression in the Philippine Sea weakens to a low-pressure area as it moves northwestward.
- 12:00 UTC at 18.1°N 131.6°E — The low-pressure area in the Philippine Sea re-develops into a tropical depression approximately 535 nmi (616 mi; 991 km) south-southeast of Kadena Air Base, Okinawa.

July 17

- 00:00 UTC at 19.4°N 130.0°E ― The JMA assesses the tropical depression over the Philippine Sea had attained 10-minute sustained winds of 30 knots (56 km/h; 35 mph).
- 06:00 UTC at 20.3°N 129.7°E ― The JMA reports the tropical depression over the Philippine Sea re-attained a minimum pressure of 1006 hPa.
- 06:00 UTC at 20.3°N 129.7°E — The JTWC gives the identifier 03W to the tropical depression over the Philippine Sea as it moves northwards. Concurrently, it attained 1-minute sustained winds of 25 knots (46 km/h; 29 mph).
- 12:00 UTC at 21.5°N 129.4°E — The JTWC last marks Tropical Depression 03W as a tropical system as it approaches the Ryukyu Islands. However, the agency continues to monitor it for signs of regeneration.

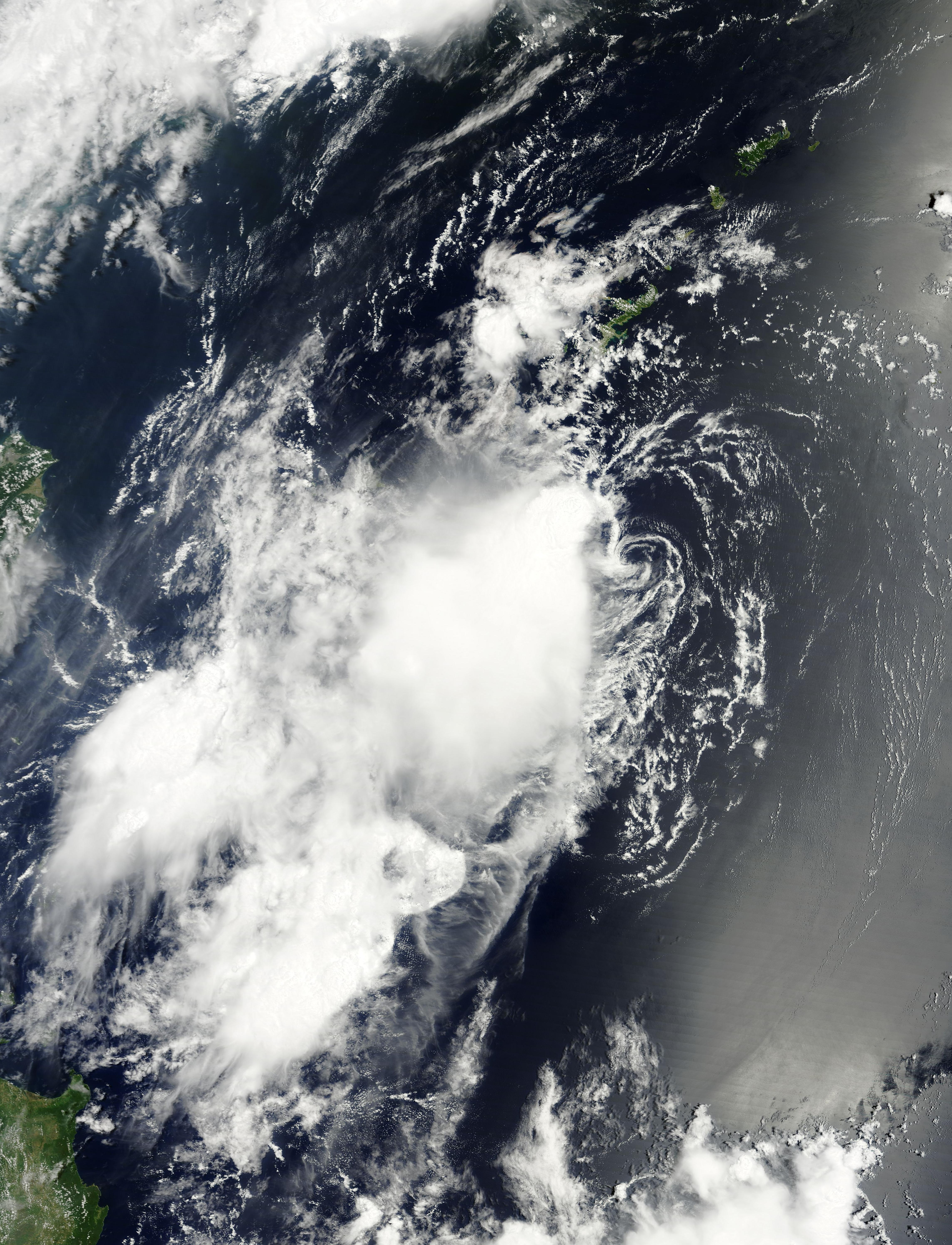
03W shortly after regenerating on July 18

July 18

- 00:00 UTC at 23.7°N 128.2°E ― The JTWC determined 03W had regained tropical depression status with 1-minute winds of 25 knots (46 km/h; 29 mph) for a brief moment before weakening back into a remnant low six hours later.
- 06:00 UTC at 24.9°N 128.3°E ― Tropical Depression Ex-03W re-attained a central pressure of 1006 hPa for the third time as it nears Okinawa.

July 20

- 06:00 UTC at 30°N 130°E — The JMA last notes Tropical Depression Ex-03W but not before dropping its central pressure to 1008 hPa; the system dissipates six hours later near the Tokara Islands.

July 22

- 18:00 UTC at 24.6°N 151.5°E —A tropical depression forms over the Pacific Ocean,well northeast of the Northern Mariana Islands.

July 23

- 06:00 UTC at 26.4°N 154.3°E ― The JTWC starts to track the tropical depression northeast of the Northern Mariana Islands after it had transitioned from being subtropical, designating it 04W.
- 12:00 UTC at 27.5°N 155.6°E — The JTWC immediately upgrades 04W to a tropical storm now located about 772 nmi (888 mi; 1,430 km) east-northeast of Iwo-To, Japan.
- 18:00 UTC at 28.9°N 157.1°E — Tropical Storm 04W becomes a named storm with the JMA naming it Lupit. Simultaneously, it attained its lowest central pressure of 1000 hPa.

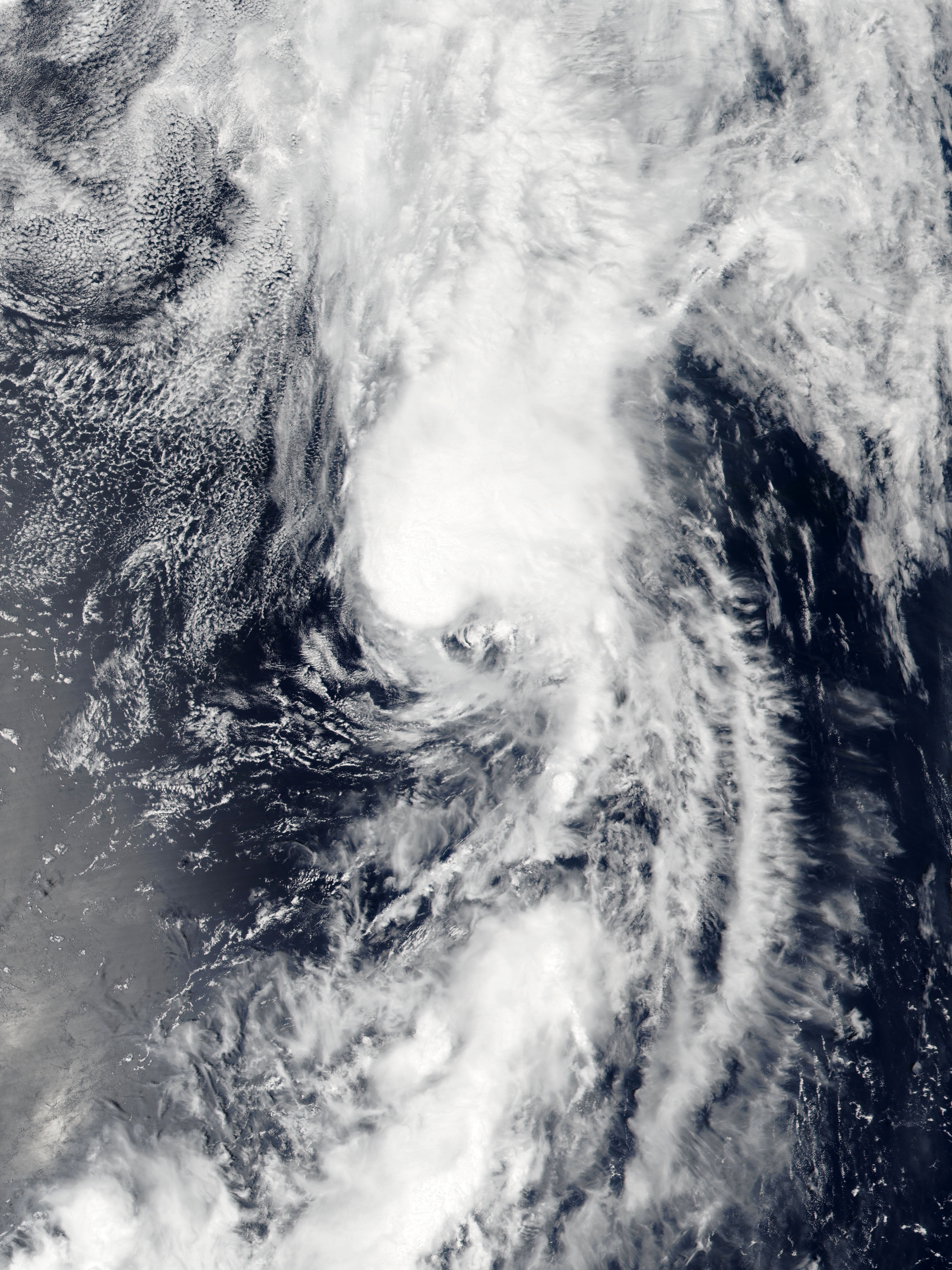
Lupit shortly after attaining its peak intensity on July 24

July 24

- 00:00 UTC at 31.0°N 158.5°E — Tropical Storm Lupit reaches its peak 10-minute winds of 40 knots (74 km/h; 46 mph).
- 00:00 UTC at 30.8°N 158.4°E — Tropical Storm Lupit reaches 1-minute sustained winds of 45 knots (83 km/h; 52 mph) from the JTWC, located about 455 nmi (524 mi; 843 km) north-northwest of Minami-Tori-Shima.
- 12:00 UTC at 35.2°N 159.4°E — The JTWC last notes Lupit as it had turned extratropical located about 985 nmi (1,134 mi; 1,824 km) east of Yokosuka, Japan.
- 18:00 UTC at 37.2°N 159.5°E — Tropical Storm Lupit becomes fully extratropical, according to the JMA.

July 25

- 12:00 UTC at 17.2°N 114.7°E — The JMA starts to track a newly-formed tropical depression over in the South China Sea west of Luzon.
- 12:00 UTC at 17.2°N 115.0°E — The JTWC designates the tropical depression in the South China Sea as Tropical Depression 05W about 314 nmi (361 mi; 582 km) to the south of Hong Kong.

July 26

- 06:00 UTC at 18.5°N 112.0°E — Tropical Depression 05W intensifies to Tropical Storm Mirinae while attaining 10-minute sustained winds of 40 knots (74 km/h; 46 mph) as it moves closer towards Hainan.
- 06:00 UTC at 18.5°N 112.0°E ― The JTWC follows suit and upgrades 05W as a tropical storm while located about 132 nmi (152 mi; 244 km) southeast of Haikou.
- 06:00 UTC at 48.4°N 152.1°E — The JMA last notes the extratropical remnants of Lupit; the system dissipates six hours later.
- 12:00 UTC at 18.5°N 110.8°E ― The JMA assesses Tropical Storm Mirinae has attained a central pressure of 996 hPa before it starts to weaken.
- 12:00 UTC at 18.9°N 110.9°E ― The JTWC assesses Tropical Storm Mirinae has attained 1-minute sustained winds of 45 knots (83 km/h; 52 mph) 77 nmi (89 mi; 143 km) south-southeast of Haikou as it was about to make landfall.
- 14:20 UTC (22:20 CST) at 18.8°N 110.4°E ― Tropical Storm Mirinae makes landfall at Wanning, Hainan.

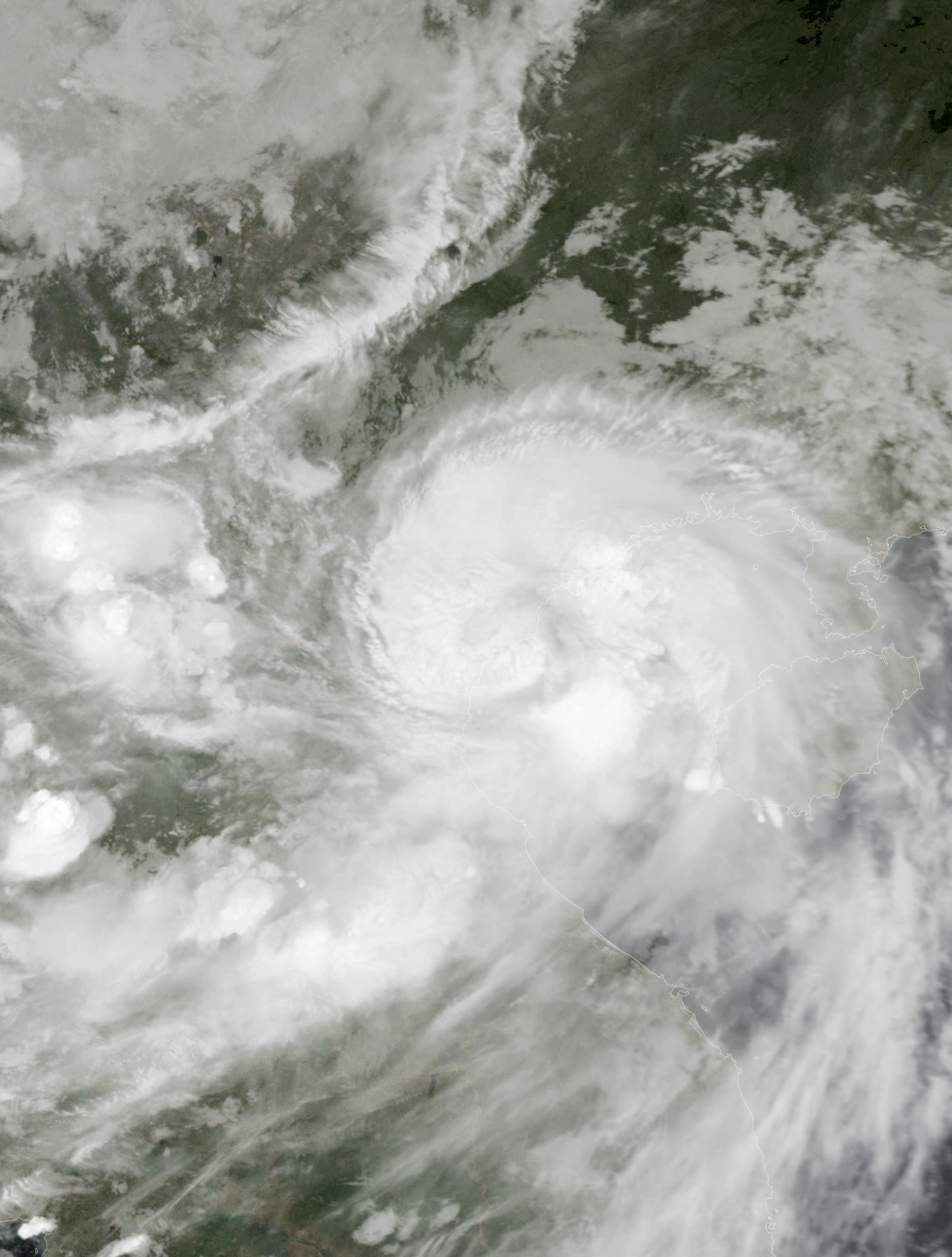
Mirinae making landfall on Vietnam on July 27

July 27

- 12:00 UTC at 19.9°N 106.7°E —Tropical Storm Mirinae re-intensifies and reaches severe tropical storm status, simultaneously attainung its secondary and best peak intensity with 10-minute winds of 55 knots (102 km/h; 63 mph) and a minimum pressure of 980 hPa (28.94 inHg) after emerging over the Gulf of Tonkin.
- 15:40 UTC (22:40 ICT) at 20.1°N 106.3°E — Mirinae makes landfall on Nam Định province.
- 18:00 UTC at 20.2°N 106.2°E — Severe Tropical Storm Mirinae finally weakens to a tropical storm after making landfall in Vietnam.
- 18:00 UTC at 20.3°N 106.2°E ― The JTWC upgrades Mirinae to a Category 1 typhoon with 1-minute sustained winds of 65 knots (120 km/h; 75 mph).

July 28

- 00:00 UTC at 20.9°N 105.4°E — The JTWC downgrades Mirinae back into a tropical storm.
- 06:00 UTC at 21.2°N 105.0°E — While moving northward, the JMA downgrades Mirinae to a tropical depression.
- 12:00 UTC at 22.4°N 104.8°E — The JTWC last notes Mirinae as it weakens to a tropical depression.
- 12:00 UTC at 22.0°N 104.9°E — The JMA last notes Tropical Depression Mirinae; the depression dissipates six hours later.

July 29

- 00:00 UTC (08:00 PHT) at 11.5°N 127.2°E — PAGASA declares the formation of Tropical Depression Carina about 195 km (121 mi) east of Borongan, Eastern Samar.
- 12:00 UTC at 11.7°N 127.1°E — The JMA starts tracking on Tropical Depression Carina.
- 12:00 UTC at 11.9°N 127.4°E — The JTWC gives Carina the identifier 06W as it was located about 394 nmi (453 mi; 730 km) east-southeast of Manila, Philippines.

July 30

- 00:00 UTC at 13.9°N 127.4°E — The JTWC upgrades Tropical Depression 06W (Carina) to a tropical storm as it was located about 364 nmi (419 mi; 674 km) east-southeast of Manila.
- 06:00 UTC at 15.5°N 125.8°E — Tropical Depression 06W (Carina) intensifies into Tropical Storm Nida from the JMA as it starts to move northwest.
- 06:00 UTC (14:00 PHT) at 15.5°N 125.8°E ― PAGASA follows suit and upgrades Nida (Carina) to a tropical storm.

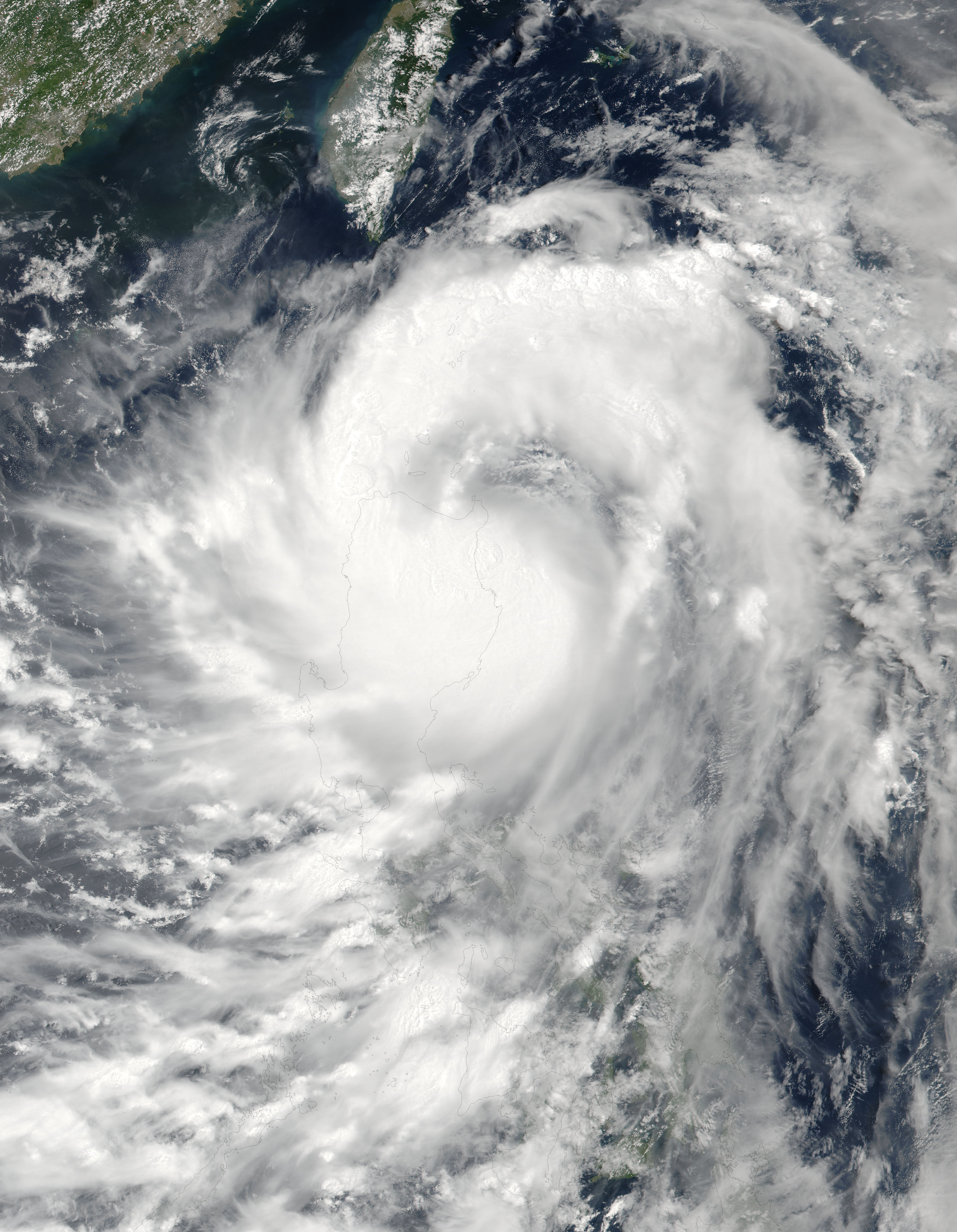
Nida shortly after landfall in Luzon on July 31

July 31

- 00:00 UTC at 17.5°N 123.1°E — Tropical Storm Nida (Carina) intensifies into a severe tropical storm as it approaches landfall in Northern Luzon.
- 00:00 UTC (08:00 PHT) at 17.5°N 123.1°E ― PAGASA follows suit and upgrades Nida (Carina) to a severe tropical storm located around 160 kilometres (86 nmi; 99 mi) east-southeast of Tuguegarao City.
- 05:20 UTC (13:20 PST) at 18.0°N 122.1°E — Severe Tropical Storm Nida (Carina) makes landfall at Cabutunan Point between Baggao and Gattaran, Cagayan.
- 06:00 UTC at 18.2°N 122.3°E — Severe Tropical Storm Nida (Carina) reaches peak intensity with 10-minute winds of 60 knots (110 km/h; 69 mph) and a minimum pressure of 975 hPa (28.79 inHg).
- 12:00 UTC at 18.8°N 121.2°E ― Severe Tropical Storm Nida (Carina) emerges over the Balintang Channel.
- 18:00 UTC (02:00 PHT, August 1) at 19.5°N 120.1°E ― The PAGASA reports Severe Tropical Storm Nida (Carina) has reached its peak within the PAR with 10-minute sustained winds of 105 kilometres per hour (57 kn; 65 mph).
- 23:00 UTC (07:00 PHT, August 1) at 20.1°N 119.0°E — The PAGASA reports Severe Tropical Storm Nida (Carina) had exited the PAR while heading to Southern China.

=== August ===
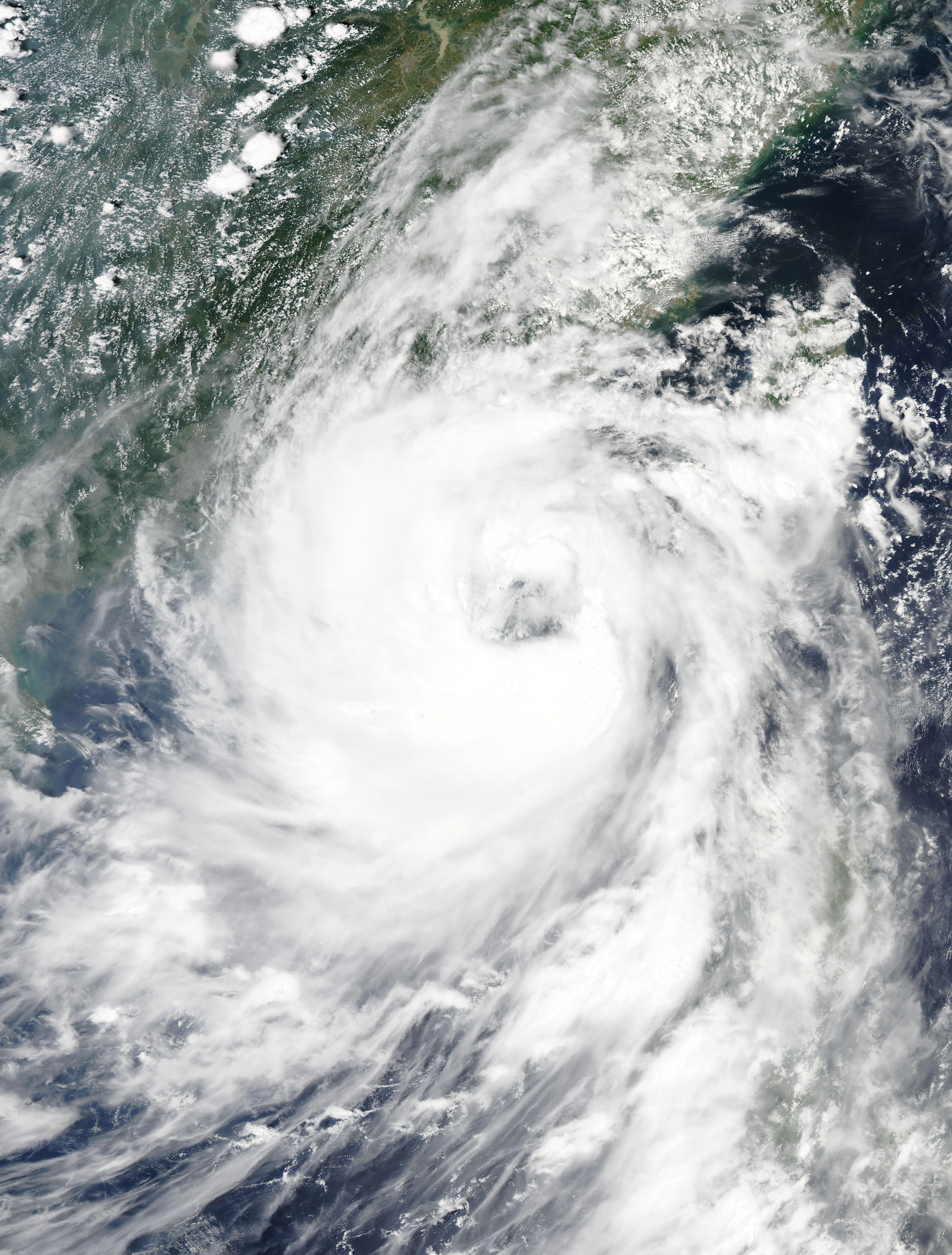
Nida approaching China on August 1

August 1

- 00:00 UTC at 20.2°N 118.9°E ― Tropical Storm Nida reaches Category 1 typhoon status from the JTWC.
- 12:00 UTC at 21.7°N 116.4°E — Typhoon Nida reaches peak intensity from the JTWC with 1-minute sustained winds of 80 knots (150 km/h; 92 mph) as it was located about 103 nmi (119 mi; 191 km) east-southeast of Hong Kong.
- 19:35 UTC (03:35 CST of August 2) at 22.3°N 114.3°E — Severe Tropical Storm Nida makes landfall over in the Dapeng Peninsula of Shenzhen, Guangdong.

August 2

- 00:00 UTC at 22.8°N 113.5°E — Severe Tropical Storm Nida weakens to a tropical storm while over Guangdong.
- 00:00 UTC at 22.8°N 113.5°E — The JTWC downgrades Nida to a tropical storm as it continues to weaken.
- 12:00 UTC at 23.9°N 110.8°E — The JMA downgrades Nida to a tropical depression inland.
- 12:00 UTC at 23.9°N 111.3°E — The JTWC last notes Tropical Storm Nida as it dissipates thereafter.
- 12:00 UTC at 16.7°N 148.8°E — A tropical depression develops to the northeast of Guam.
- 18:00 UTC at 16.7°N 148.2°E — The JMA assesses the tropical depression northeast of Guam briefly dropped its central pressure to 1002 hPa, as it slowly turns to the north.

August 3

- 00:00 UTC at 25.0°N 107.9°E — The JMA last notes Tropical Depression Nida; the depression dissipates six hours later over China.

August 4

- 00:00 UTC at 18.4°N 148.5°E — The JMA upgrades the tropical depression to the northeast of Guam into a tropical storm, naming it Omais.

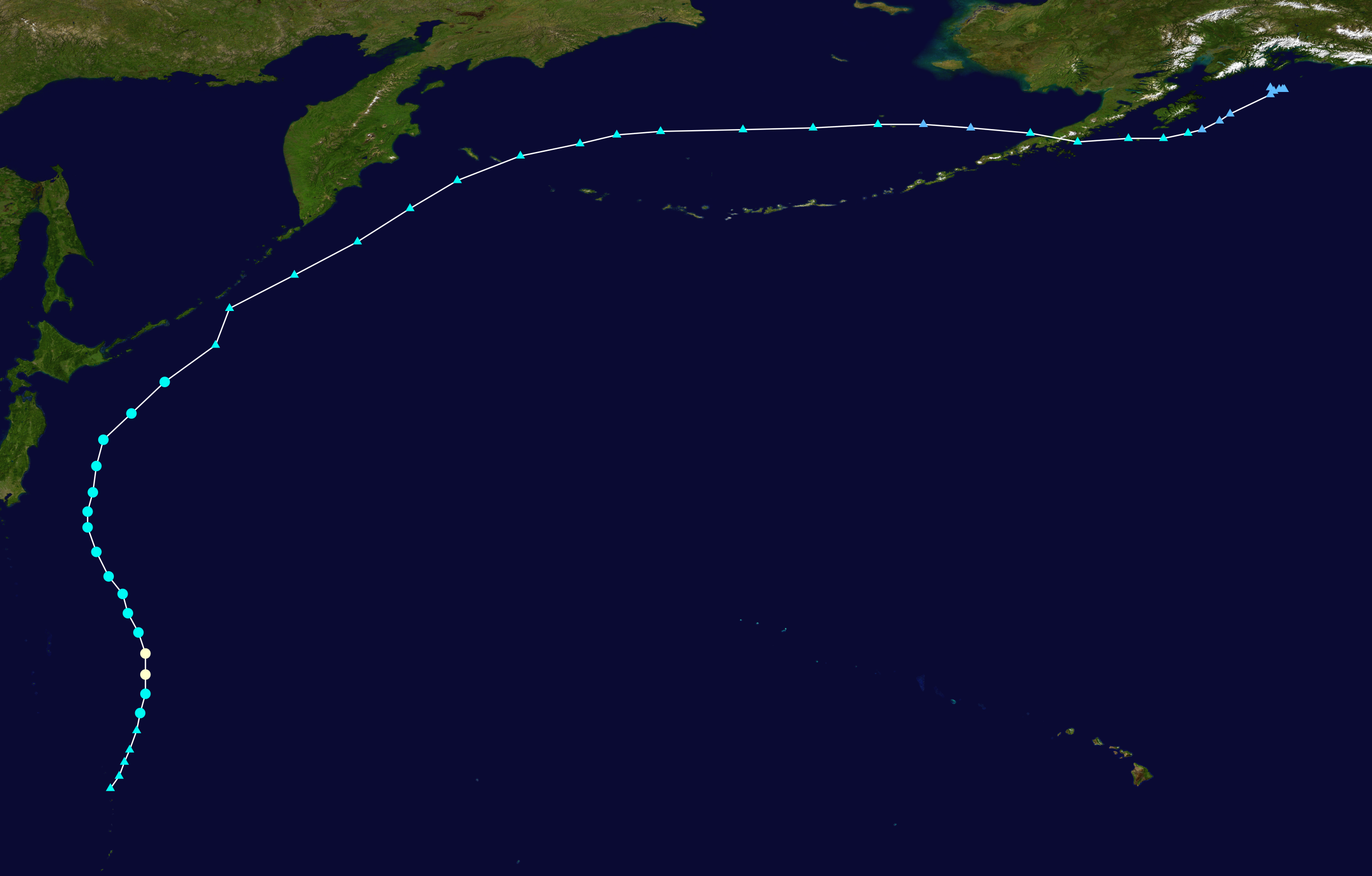
Track of Omais during early August

August 5

- 12:00 UTC at 22.5°N 147.8°E — Tropical Storm Omais intensifies into a severe tropical storm as it continues to move northwards.
- 18:00 UTC at 23.1°N 147.4°E ― The JTWC reports Omais has transitioned to a tropical storm after forming as a monsoon depression.

August 6

- 00:00 UTC at 22.1°N 126.3°E― A tropical depression forms in the Philippine Sea south of Okinawa.
- 06:00 UTC at 24.9°N 147.7°E — Severe Tropical Storm Omais reaches peak intensity with 10-minute sustained winds of 60 knots (110 km/h; 69 mph) and a pressure of 975 hPa (28.79 inHg) as it was located about 731 nmi (841 mi; 1,354 km) southeast of Yokosuka.
- 06:00 UTC at 25.3°N 147.7°E ― The JTWC upgrades Omais into a Category 1 typhoon and peaked with 1-minute sustained winds of 65 knots (120 km/h; 75 mph).
- 18:00 UTC at 27.7°N 147.3°E — The JTWC downgrades Typhoon Omais to a high-end tropical storm as it was located about 603 nmi (694 mi; 1,117 km) to the southeast of Yokosuka.
- 18:00 UTC at 21.8°N 126.4°E― The tropical depression south of Okinawa attains a central pressure of 998 hPa as it moves north-northwestward.

August 7

- 06:00 UTC at 23.7°N 127.0°E ― The JMA assesses the tropical depression south of Okinawa has attained 10-minute sustained winds of 30 knots (56 km/h; 35 mph).
- 12:00 UTC at 18.8°N 163.0°E — Another tropical depression develops well west of Wake Island.

August 8

- 06:00 UTC at 25.8°N 126.1°E ― The tropical depression now west of Okinawa re-attains a central pressure of 998 hPa as it enters the East China Sea.
- 06:00 UTC at 17.3°N 161.1°E — The tropical depression now about 344 nmi (396 mi; 637 km) west-southwest of Wake Island becomes Tropical Depression 08W.
- 18:00 UTC at 27.6°N 124.6°E ― The JMA assesses the tropical depression south of Okinawa has re-attained a central pressure of 998 hPa once again as it swings to the west.
- 18:00 UTC at 16.9°N 160.0°E ― The JTWC upgrades 08W to a tropical storm.

August 9

- 00:00 UTC at 16.9°N 159.3°E — Tropical Depression 08W intensifies into Tropical Storm Conson.
- 06:00 UTC at 40.2°N 146.9°E ― The JTWC last notes Omais as it had turned extratropical and further heads to the northeast.
- 06:00 UTC (14:00 CST) at 27.2°N 120.3°E― The JMA last notes the tropical depression formerly located over East China Sea as it made landfall over Eastern China; the system dissipates six hours later.
- 12:00 UTC at 17.0°N 157.8°E ― The JMA reports Tropical Storm Conson attained an initial peak intensity of 10-minute sustained winds of 45 knots (83 km/h; 52 mph) and a central pressure of 990 hPa which it will maintain for a few days before weakening slightly.
- 12:00 UTC at 17.2°N 157.9°E ― The JTWC reports Tropical Storm Conson attained 1-minute sustained winds of 50 knots (93 km/h; 58 mph) before weakening.
- 12:00 UTC at 42.0°N 148.8°E — The JMA downgrades Omais to a tropical storm as it starts its extratropical transition.
- 18:00 UTC at 44.1°N 151.7°E — The JMA assesses Tropical Storm Omais has turned extratropical.

August 10

- 00:00 UTC at 22.5°N 126.2°E ― The JMA reports a tropical depression develops south of Okinawa with 10-minute sustained winds of 30 knots (56 km/h; 35 mph).
- 18:00 UTC at 24.4°N 122.5°E ― The JMA assesses the tropical depression formerly south of Okinawa attains a central pressure of 998 hPa as it was about to make landfall in Taiwan.

August 11

- 00:00 UTC at 20.0°N 153.4°E ― The JTWC reports Conson has weakened to a tropical depression as it now shifts its movement to the northeast.
- 00:00 UTC (08:00 TST) at 25.1°N 121.3°E ― The tropical depression formerly south of Okinawa makes landfall in Northern Taiwan as it moved westwards.
- 06:00 UTC at 20.5°N 154.0°E ― Conson re-intensifies back to a tropical storm, according to the JTWC.
- 06:00 UTC at 24.4°N 119.3°E ― The tropical depression emerges over the Taiwan Strait.
- 12:00 UTC (20:00 CST) at 23.9°N 117.8°E― The tropical depression makes its final landfall over Eastern China.

August 12

- 00:00 UTC at 16.0°N 137.6°E — The JMA starts to track a tropical depression west-northwest of Guam.
- 06:00 UTC at 56.4°N 178.2°W — The JMA last notes the extratropical remnants of Omais as it had exited the basin.
- 06:00 UTC at 22.8°N 121.6°E― The JMA marks another tropical depression near the eastern coast of Taiwan with a minimum pressure of 1002 hPa.
- 12:00 UTC at 34.3°N 178.7°E ― The JMA reports a tropical depression from east of the International Date Line enters the basin while interacting with a low-pressure area. The JMA assesses the depression having a central pressure of 1018 hPa.
- 18:00 UTC at 23.6°N 121.8°E ― The JMA assesses the tropical depression near Taiwan attained 10-minute sustained winds of 30 knots (56 km/h; 35 mph).
- 18:00 UTC at 23.9°N 109.7°E ― The tropical depression inland China attains a lower central pressure of 996 hPa.
- 18:00 UTC at 35.2°N 176.4°E — The JMA last notes the tropical depression near the IDL; the depression dissipates six hours later.

August 13

- 00:00 UTC at 17.3°N 139.4°E — The JTWC designates the depression now northwest of Guam as Tropical Depression 09W.
- 00:00 UTC (08:00 TST) at 24.9°N 121.7°E― The JMA last notes the tropical depression as it makes landfall over northeastern Taiwan. The system dissipates six hours later.
- 06:00 UTC at 31.6°N 154.3°E ― Tropical Storm Conson attains 10-minute sustained winds of 45 knots (83 km/h; 52 mph) and a much lower pressure of 985 hPa (29.09 inHg), after turning to the northwest.
- 06:00 UTC at 23.0°N 107.2°E ― The tropical depression inland China re-attains a minimum pressure of 996 hPa as it was about to move into Vietnam.
- 12:00 UTC at 32.8°N 153.0°E — Tropical Storm Conson reaches peak intensity with higher 1-minute winds of 55 knots (102 km/h; 63 mph).
- 12:00 UTC at 21.9°N 105.2°E — The JMA last notes the tropical depression over Vietnam; the system dissipates six hours later inland.
- 18:00 UTC at 20.9°N 142.9°E — Tropical Depression 09W intensifies into Tropical Storm Chanthu.

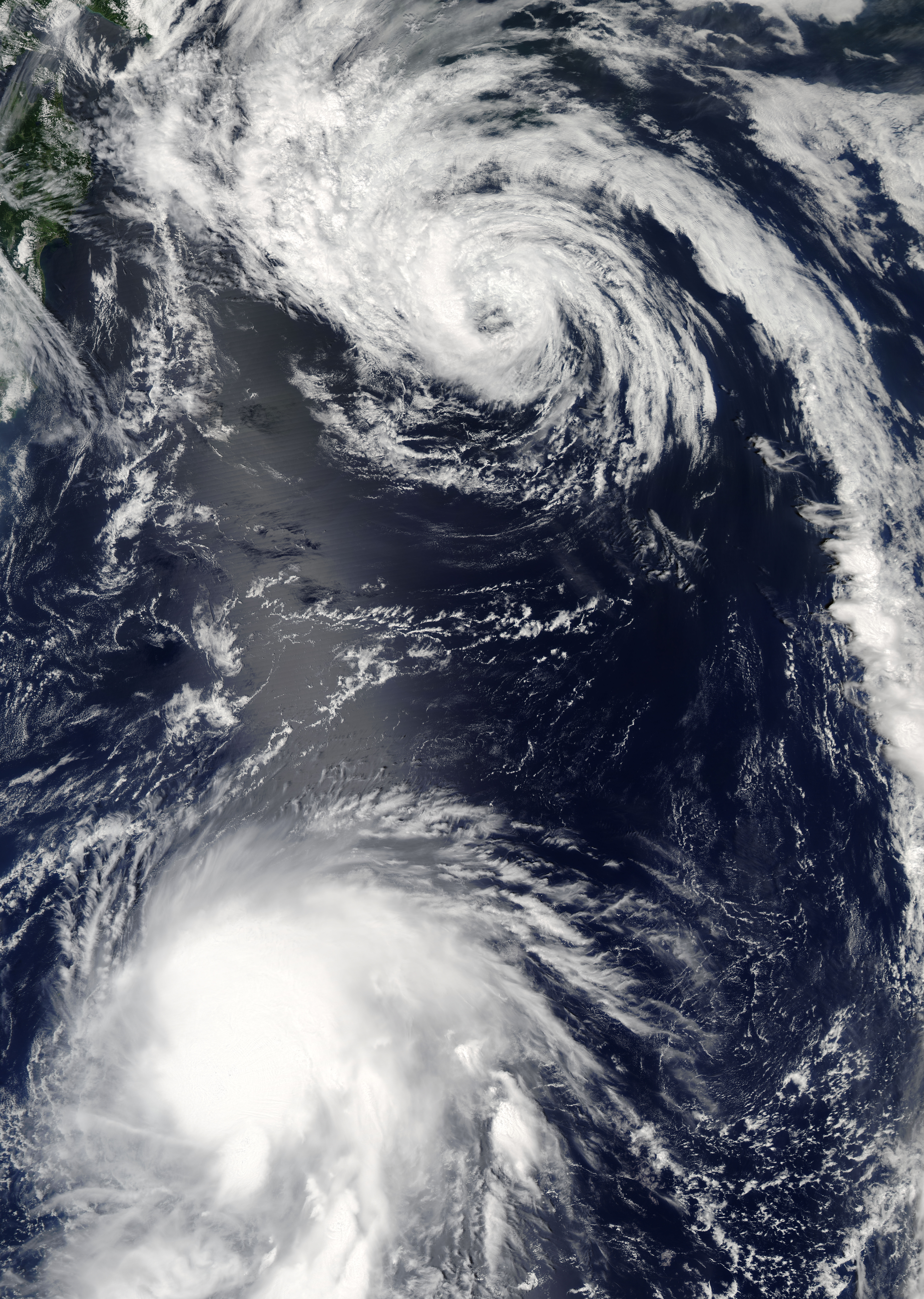
Conson (north) approaching landfall in Japan as Chanthu (south) follows behind and strengthens on August 14

August 14

- 00:00 UTC at 21.1°N 143.2°E ― The JTWC declares Chanthu as a tropical storm.
- 12:00 UTC at 23.9°N 144.6°E ― The JTWC reports Tropical Storm Chanthu attained an initial peak intensity of 1-minute sustained winds of 50 knots (93 km/h; 58 mph) before weakening.
- 18:00 UTC at 42.2°N 146.3°E — The JTWC last notes Conson as it had turned extratropical based on their analysis.
- 18:00 UTC at 25.7°N 144.8°E — Tropical Storm Chanthu intensifies into a severe tropical storm and attains 10-minute sustained winds of 50 knots (93 km/h; 58 mph) and a minimum pressure of 985 hPa.
- 23:00 UTC (08:00 JST) at 43.3°N 145.5°E ― Tropical Storm Conson makes landfall over Nemuro Peninsula, Hokkaido as it starts to turn extratropical.

August 15

- 00:00 UTC at 43.6°N 145.6°E — Tropical Storm Conson becomes extratropical over the Sea of Okhotsk, according to the JMA.
- 06:00 UTC at 21.7°N 117.0°E ― A tropical depression forms over the South China Sea near the coast of Southern China.
- 12:00 UTC at 29.4°N 143.8°E ― Severe Tropical Storm Chanthu weakens back into a tropical storm.
- 18:00 UTC at 20.6°N 108.7°E ― Another tropical depression forms over the Gulf of Tonkin. The JMA assesses the system has a central pressure of 996 hPa.

August 16

- 00:00 UTC at 31.6°N 142.5°E ― Tropical Storm Chanthu re-strengthens to severe tropical storm status and attains a lower minimum pressure of 980 hPa.
- 00:00 UTC at 20.6°N 108.6°E ― The JMA last notes the tropical depression over the Gulf of Tonkin. The system dissipates six hours later.
- 12:00 UTC at 58.7°N 143.1°E — The JMA last notes the extratropical remnants of Conson near Russian Far East; the system fully dissipates six hours later.

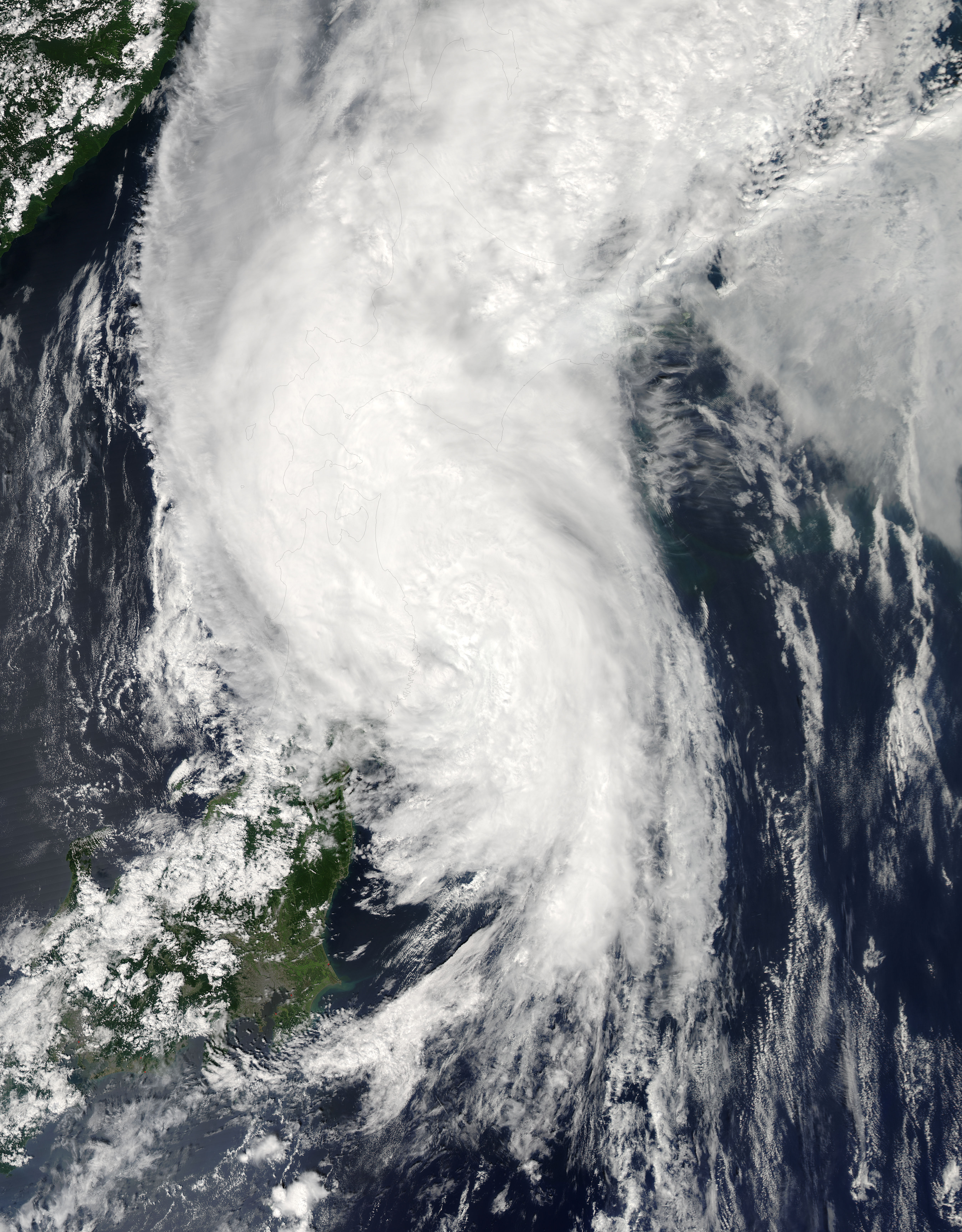
Chanthu about to make landfall in Japan on August 17

August 17

- 00:00 UTC at 37.8°N 141.7°E ― Severe Tropical Storm Chanthu reaches a higher 10-minute sustained winds of 55 knots (102 km/h; 63 mph) as it parallels the northeastern coast of Honshu.
- 00:00 UTC at 15.3°N 138.9°E ― The JMA marks a tropical depression northwest of Guam.
- 00:00 UTC at 26.4°N 159.1°E ― The JMA marks another tropical depression well northwest of Wake Island.
- 00:00 UTC 15.4°N 139.1°E ― The JTWC designates the tropical depression northwest of Guam as 10W.
- 06:00 UTC at 40.7°N 142.8°E ― The JTWC reports Chanthu had attained higher 1-minute sustained winds of 60 knots (110 km/h; 69 mph) as it was turning extratropical.
- 08:30 UTC (17:30 JST) at 42.1°N 143.0°E ― Severe Tropical Storm Chanthu makes landfall near Cape Erimo, Hokkaido.
- 12:00 UTC at 44.2°N 143.3°E ― The JTWC reports Chanthu has completed its extratropical transition as it was about to emerge off the island of Hokkaido.
- 18:00 UTC at 21.1°N 112.2°E ― The JMA upgrades the tropical depression near the southern coast of China to a tropical storm, naming it Dianmu.
- 18:00 UTC at 47.7°N 144.6°E ― The JMA reports Chanthu has turned extratropical over the Sea of Okhotsk while moving northward.
- 18:00 UTC at 28.4°N 153.8°E ― The JTWC reports the tropical depression northwest of Wake Island becomes Tropical Storm 12W after it had transitioned from being subtropical.

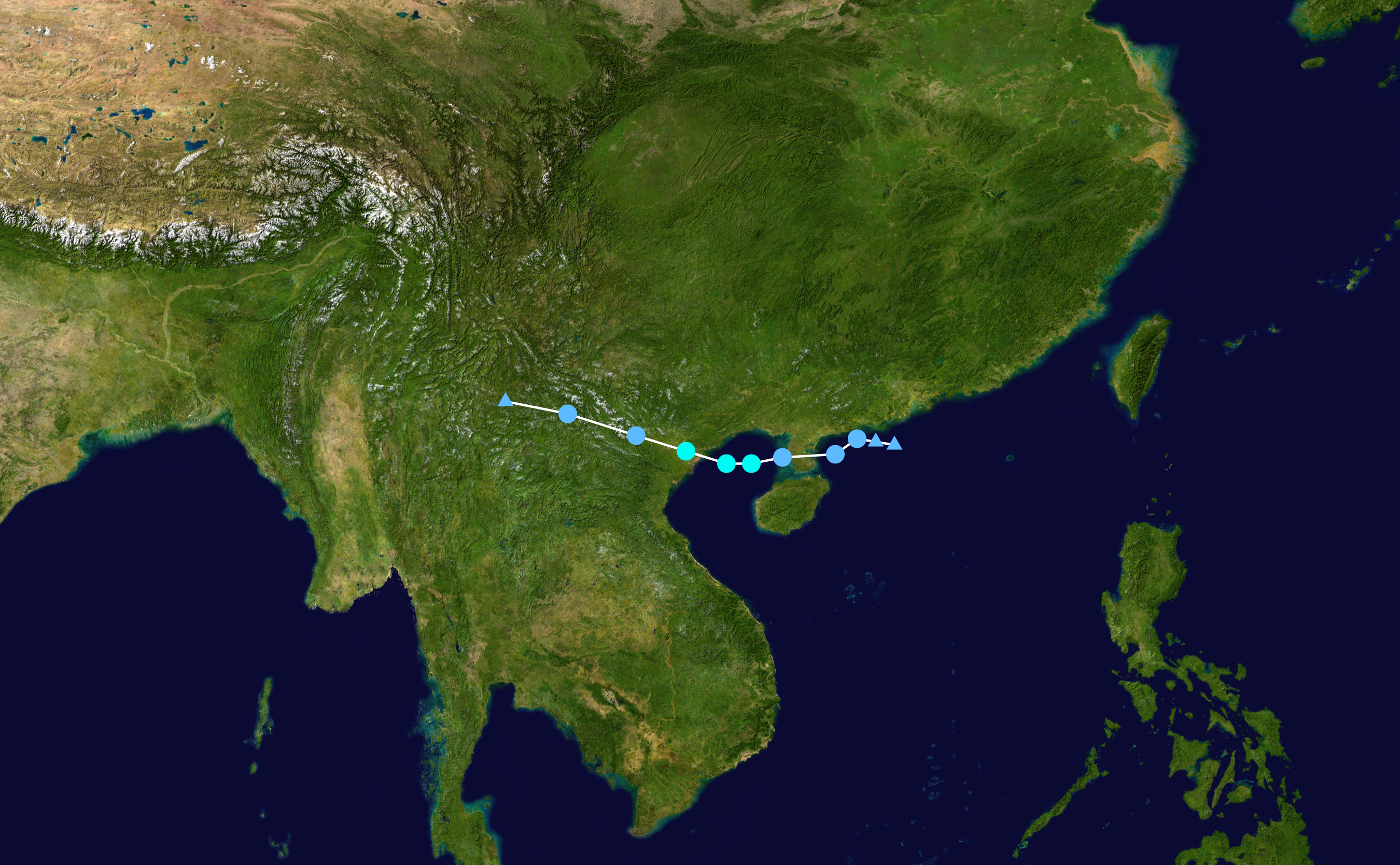
Track of Dianmu during mid-August

August 18

- 00:00 UTC at 21.3°N 111.9°E ― The JTWC starts to track on Dianmu as a tropical depression, designating it as 11W.
- 06:00 UTC (14:00 CST) at 20.8°N 110.3°E ― Tropical Storm Dianmu makes landfall on Leizhou Peninsula.
- 06:00 UTC at 15.6°N 142.6°E ― The JTWC upgrades 10W to a tropical storm as it turns to the north.
- 12:00 UTC at 20.5°N 109.2°E ― Tropical Storm Dianmu emerges over the Gulf of Tonkin.
- 12:00 UTC at 22.3°N 152.8°E ― Another tropical depression forms about 1,300 km (810 mi) to the northeast of Guam.
- 18:00 UTC at 20.5°N 108.2°E ― The JMA assesses Dianmu to have reached its peak intensity with 10-minute sustained winds of 40 knots (74 km/h; 46 mph) and a minimum pressure of 980 hPa.
- 18:00 UTC at 20.5°N 108.5°E ― The JTWC upgrades Dianmu to tropical storm status.
- 18:00 UTC at 60.7°N 149.1°E ― The JMA last notes the extratropical remnants of Chanthu as it further moves north towards the Russian Far East.

August 19

- 00:00 UTC at 20.5°N 107.7°E ― The JTWC assesses Dianmu to have attained 1-minute sustained winds of 45 knots (83 km/h; 52 mph) as it was about to make landfall on Vietnam.
- 06:00 UTC (13:00 ICT) at 20.6°N 106.4°E ― Tropical Storm Dianmu makes landfall on Hai Phong – Thai Binh provinces, Northern Vietnam.
- 06:00 UTC at 17.8°N 141.8°E ― The JMA upgrades 10W as a tropical storm, naming it Mindulle.
- 12:00 UTC at 20.8°N 104.8°E ― Tropical Storm Dianmu weakens to a tropical depression as it was about to traverse into Laos.
- 12:00 UTC at 21.4°N 104.8°E ― The JTWC downgrades Dianmu to a tropical depression as it traverses further inland.
- 12:00 UTC at 28.9°N 150.9°E ― The JTWC designates the tropical depression formerly located northeast of Guam as 13W as it turns to the northwest.
- 18:00 UTC at 21.2°N 102.5°E ― The JMA last notes Tropical Depression Dianmu over northern Laos; the system dissipates six hours later.
- 18:00 UTC at 22.1°N 102.6°E ― The JTWC follows suit, last noting Tropical Depression Dianmu weakening overland.

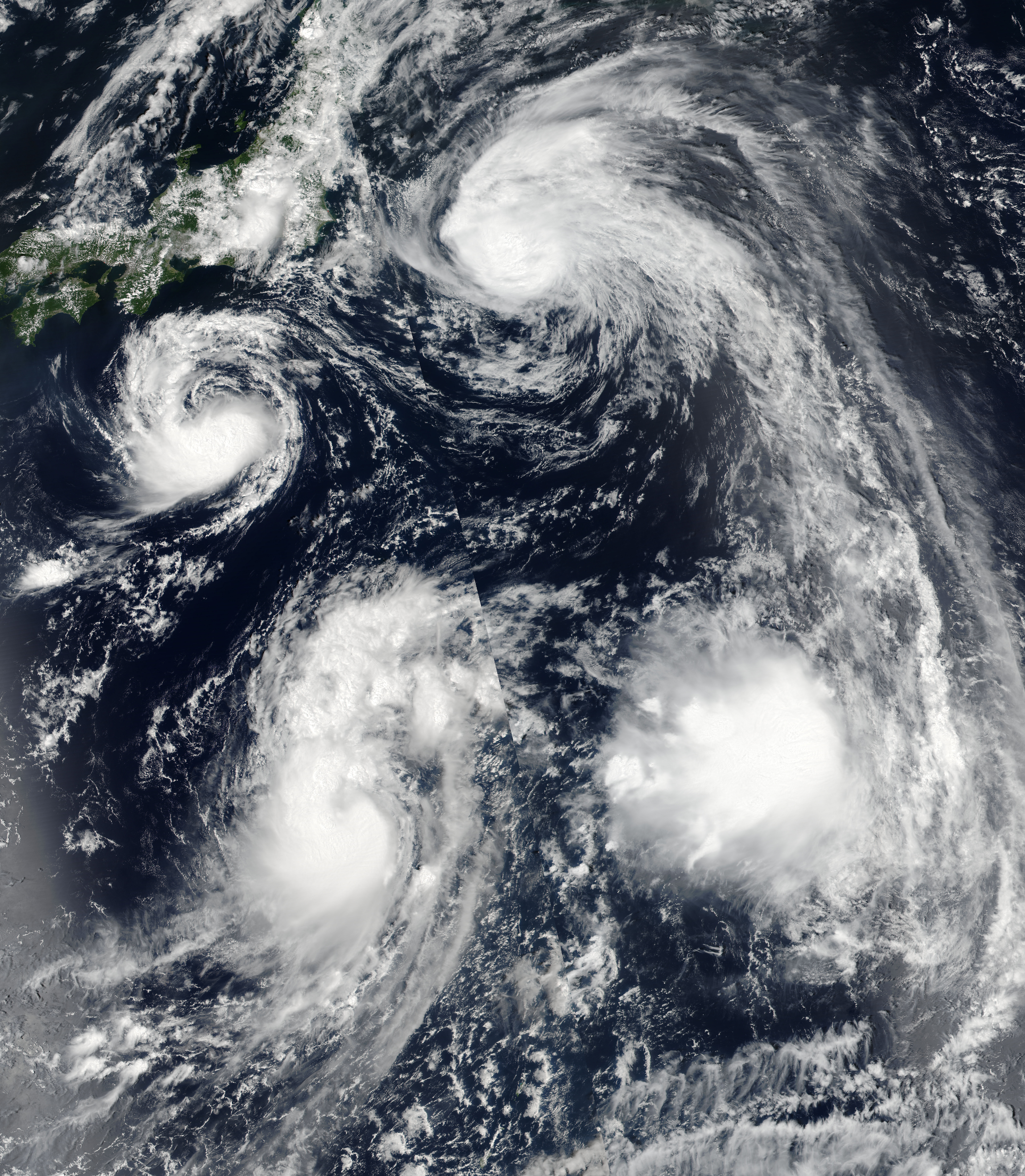
A trio of storms present during August 20, namely Lionrock (top left), Kompasu (top right), and Mindulle (bottom left)

August 20

- 00:00 UTC at 32.9°N 147.3°E ― The JMA upgrades 13W into a tropical storm, naming it Kompasu as it heads toward Japan with 10-minute sustained winds of 35 knots (65 km/h; 40 mph) and a minimum pressure of 994 hPa.
- 06:00 UTC at 34.5°N 145.3°E ― The JTWC follows suit and upgrades Kompasu into a tropical storm. Simultaneously, according to the JTWC, the system reached its peak with 1-minute sustained winds of 35 knots (65 km/h; 40 mph)
- 12:00 UTC at 24.4°N 141.1°E ― Tropical Storm Mindulle intensifies to a severe tropical storm as it continues moving northwards toward Japan.
- 18:00 UTC at 26.2°N 140.7°E ― The JTWC assesses Tropical Storm Mindulle had reached an initial peak intensity of 1-minute sustained winds of 60 knots (110 km/h; 69 mph).

August 21

- 06:00 UTC at 30.0°N 140.1°E ― Tropical Storm Mindulle fluctuates in intensity, with the JTWC reporting the storm had re-attained 1-minute sustained winds of 60 knots (110 km/h; 69 mph).
- 06:00 UTC at 40.9°N 143.0°E ― The JTWC assesses Kompasu has weakened to a tropical depression as it starts its extratropical transition and moves toward Hokkaido.
- 12:00 UTC at 42.4°N 143.8°E ― The JTWC last notes Kompasu as it had turned extratropical, based on their analysis.
- 12:00 UTC at 29.2°N 133.3°E ― After moving generally westward and passing ahead of north-moving Tropical Storm Kompasu, the JMA designates 12W as Tropical Storm Lionrock as it decelerates and turns to the southeast, interacting with approaching Severe Tropical Storm Mindulle.
- 14:00 UTC at 42.983333°N 144.383333°E ― Tropical Storm Kompasu strikes Kushiro City, Hokkaido Prefecture.
- 18:00 UTC at 33.1°N 139.4°E ― The JMA upgrades Mindulle to a typhoon and simultaneously peaked with 10-minute sustained winds of 65 knots (120 km/h; 75 mph) and a minimum pressure of 975 hPa located around 40 km (25 mi) east of Hachijō-jima.
- 18:00 UTC at 45.0°N 145.0°E ― Kompasu turns extratropical over the Sea of Okhotsk, according to the JMA.

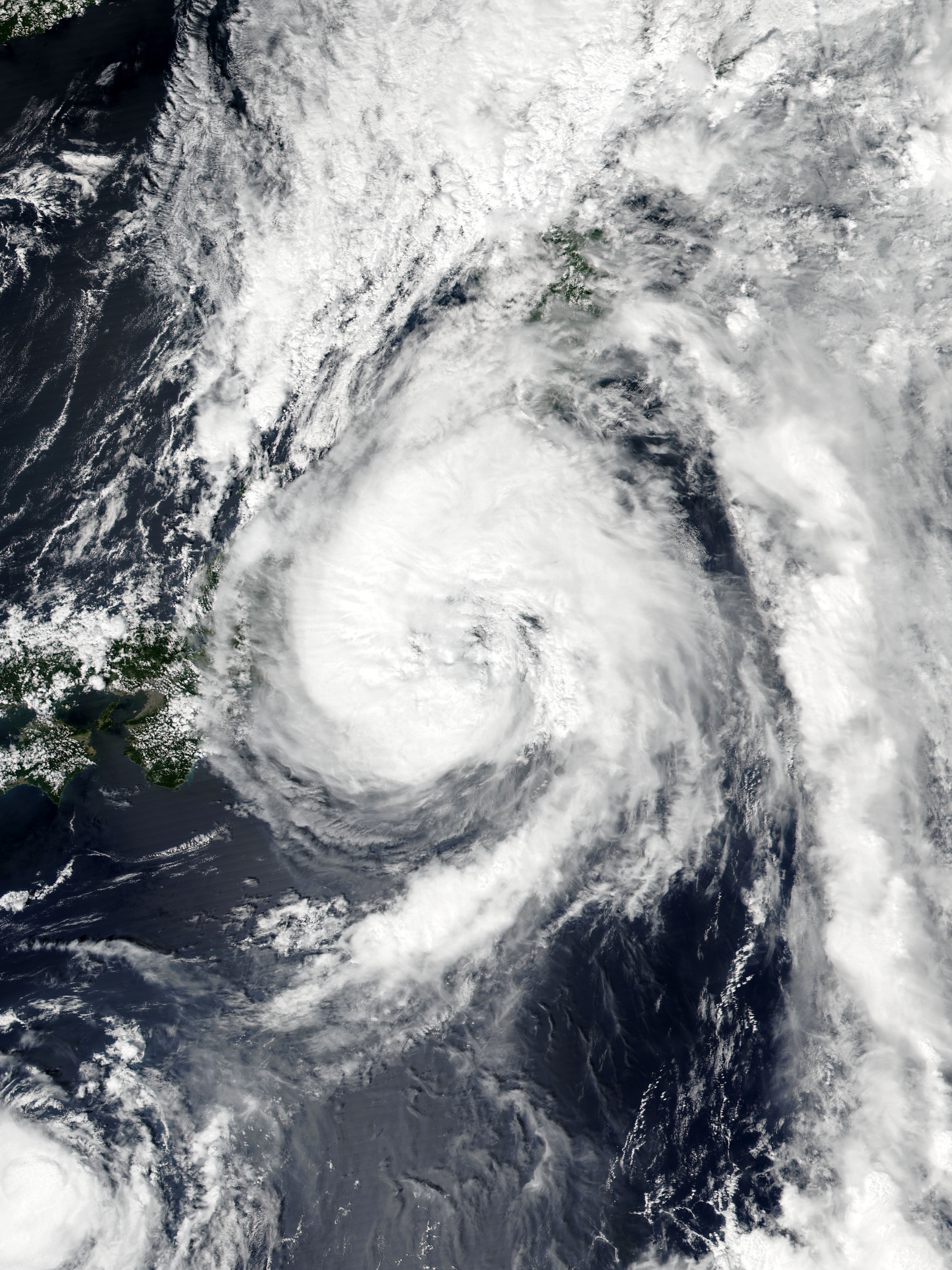
Mindulle shortly after first landfall in Japan during August 22

August 22

- 00:00 UTC at 34.3°N 139.5°E ― The JTWC upgrades Mindulle to a Category 1 typhoon with 1-minute sustained winds of 65 knots (120 km/h; 75 mph) as it was about to make landfall in Japan.
- 03:30 UTC (12:30 JST) at 34.996583°N 139.869972°E ― Typhoon Mindulle makes landfall near Tateyama, Chiba.
- 06:00 UTC at 35.9°N 140.0°E ― Mindulle weakens to a severe tropical storm as it continues moving northeast.
- 06:00 UTC at 35.9°N 140.1°E ― The JTWC follows suit and downgrades Mindulle to a tropical storm.
- 06:00 UTC at 48.2°N 147.0°E ― The JMA last marks the extratropical remnants of Kompasu as it becomes embedded into another extratropical cyclone. The system was fully absorbed six hours later.
- 18:00 UTC at 40.4°N 141.9°E ― Severe Tropical Storm Mindulle emerges on the Pacific Ocean south of Hokkaido.
- 21:00 UTC at 42.4°N 142.6°E ― Severe Tropical Storm Mindulle makes another landfall on the central part of Hidaka District, Hokkaido Prefecture.

August 23

- 00:00 UTC at 28.0°N 134.4°E ― The JMA upgrades Lionrock into a severe tropical storm as it migrates southwestwards.
- 00:00 UTC at 44.4°N 144.1°E ― The JTWC last notes Mindulle as it has turned extratropical.
- 00:00 UTC at 12.2°N 145.8°E ― The JTWC declares the formation of Tropical Depression 14W near Guam.
- 03:00 UTC at 45.1°N 145.3°E ― The JMA last notes Mindulle as it transitions to an extratropical cyclone. The remnants did not last long as it was fully absorbed by another extratropical low over the Sea of Okhotsk six hours later.
- 06:00 UTC at 16.8°N 118.9°E ― A tropical depression forms near the western coast of Luzon. The JMA assesses the system with a central pressure of 1000 hPa.
- 06:00 UTC at 13.7°N 145.4°E ― The JTWC upgrades 14W to a tropical storm while passing northeast of Guam and moving closer to Rota.
- 12:00 UTC at 15.7°N 145.1°E ― Tropical Storm 14W reaches its peak intensity from the JTWC with 1-minute sustained winds of 40 knots (74 km/h; 46 mph) located northwest of Saipan.
- 18:00 UTC at 25.8°N 133.3°E ― Severe Tropical Storm Lionrock intensifies into a typhoon as it continues to dip southwestwards towards the PAR.
- 18:00 UTC at 25.9°N 133.3°E ― The JTWC follows suit and upgrades Lionrock into a Category 1 typhoon east of Minamidaitojima Island.
- 18:00 UTC at 17.6°N 117.6°E ― The tropical depression west of Luzon re-attains its lowest central pressure of 1000 hPa as it continues to traverse the South China Sea.
- 18:00 UTC at 17.4°N 145.3°E ― 14W weakens to a tropical depression as it curves northeast.

August 24

- 00:00 UTC at 19.1°N 145.8°E ― The JMA starts tracking on 14W as a tropical depression with 10-minute sustained winds of 30 knots (56 km/h; 35 mph) and a minimum pressure of 1002 hPa.
- 00:00 UTC at 26.6°N 148.8°E ― Another tropical depression forms east of the Ogasawara Islands.
- 03:00 UTC (11:00 PHT) at 24.9°N 132.5°E ― The PAGASA reports Typhoon Lionrock had entered the PAR and was named Dindo.
- 06:00 UTC at 24.8°N 132.3°E ― Typhoon Lionrock (Dindo) further intensifies to a high-end Category 2 typhoon while continuing its southwestward trek.
- 06:00 UTC at 27.5°N 148.2°E ― The JMA last notes the tropical depression east of the Ogasawara Islands while achieving a minimum pressure of 1000 hPa. The depression dissipates six hours later.
- 06:00 UTC at 18.7°N 115.3°E ― The JMA also last notes the tropical depression west of Luzon as a tropical cyclone. The system weakens to a low-pressure area over the South China Sea six hours later.
- 06:00 UTC at 22.2°N 147.3°E ― The JTWC last notes 14W while attaining a secondary peak with 1-minute sustained winds of 30 knots (56 km/h; 35 mph) as it accelerates to the northeast.
- 12:00 UTC at 24.3°N 131.8°E ― Typhoon Lionrock (Dindo) reaches Category 3 typhoon status.
- 18:00 UTC at 23.9°N 131.4°E ― According to the JMA, Typhoon Lionrock (Dindo) achieves an initial peak intensity with 10-minute sustained winds of 85 knots (157 km/h; 98 mph) and a minimum pressure of 945 hPa as it slows down in the Philippine Sea.
- 18:00 UTC at 23.8°N 131.4°E ― The JTWC assesses Lionrock (Dindo) to have reached high-end Category 3 typhoon strength with 1-minute sustained winds of 110 knots (200 km/h; 130 mph).
- 18:00 UTC at(02:00 PHT, August 25) at 23.8°N 131.4°E ― The PAGASA reports Typhoon Lionrock (Dindo) had attained 10-minute sustained winds of 160 kilometres per hour (86 kn; 99 mph).
- 18:00 UTC at 27.3°N 148.7°E ― The JMA last notes Tropical Depression Ex-14W as it further moves north. The system dissipates 6 hours later.

August 25

- 12:00 UTC at 23.4°N 130.9°E ― Typhoon Lionrock (Dindo) weakens to a Category 2 typhoon as it becomes almost stationary.

August 27

- 00:00 UTC at 23.7°N 133.1°E ― Typhoon Lionrock (Dindo) regains its strength to a Category 3 typhoon as it now heads to the northeast.
- 00:00 UTC (08:00 PHT) at 23.8°N 133.0°E ― After slightly weakening, the PAGASA reports Typhoon Lionrock (Dindo) had re-attained its peak 10-minute sustained winds of 160 kilometres per hour (86 kn; 99 mph).
- 00:00 UTC at 19.0°N 116.3°E ― Another tropical depression forms over the South China Sea, possibly coming from the remnants of an earlier marked tropical depression near the area.
- 06:00 UTC at 18.9°N 117.1°E ― The tropical depression over the South China Sea achieves a minimum pressure of 1004 hPa while moving to the east-northeast.
- 12:00 UTC at 19.0°N 117.8°E ― The JMA last notes the tropical depression over the South China Sea as it dissipates while moving toward Luzon Strait. The depression dissipates six hours later.
- 15:00 UTC (23:00 PHT) at 24.7°N 135.0°E ― The PAGASA reports Typhoon Lionrock (Dindo) had left the PAR.
- 18:00 UTC at 25.2°N 135.6°E ― Typhoon Lionrock continues to intensify and reaches Category 4 typhoon status while it becomes closer to the Ogasawara Islands.

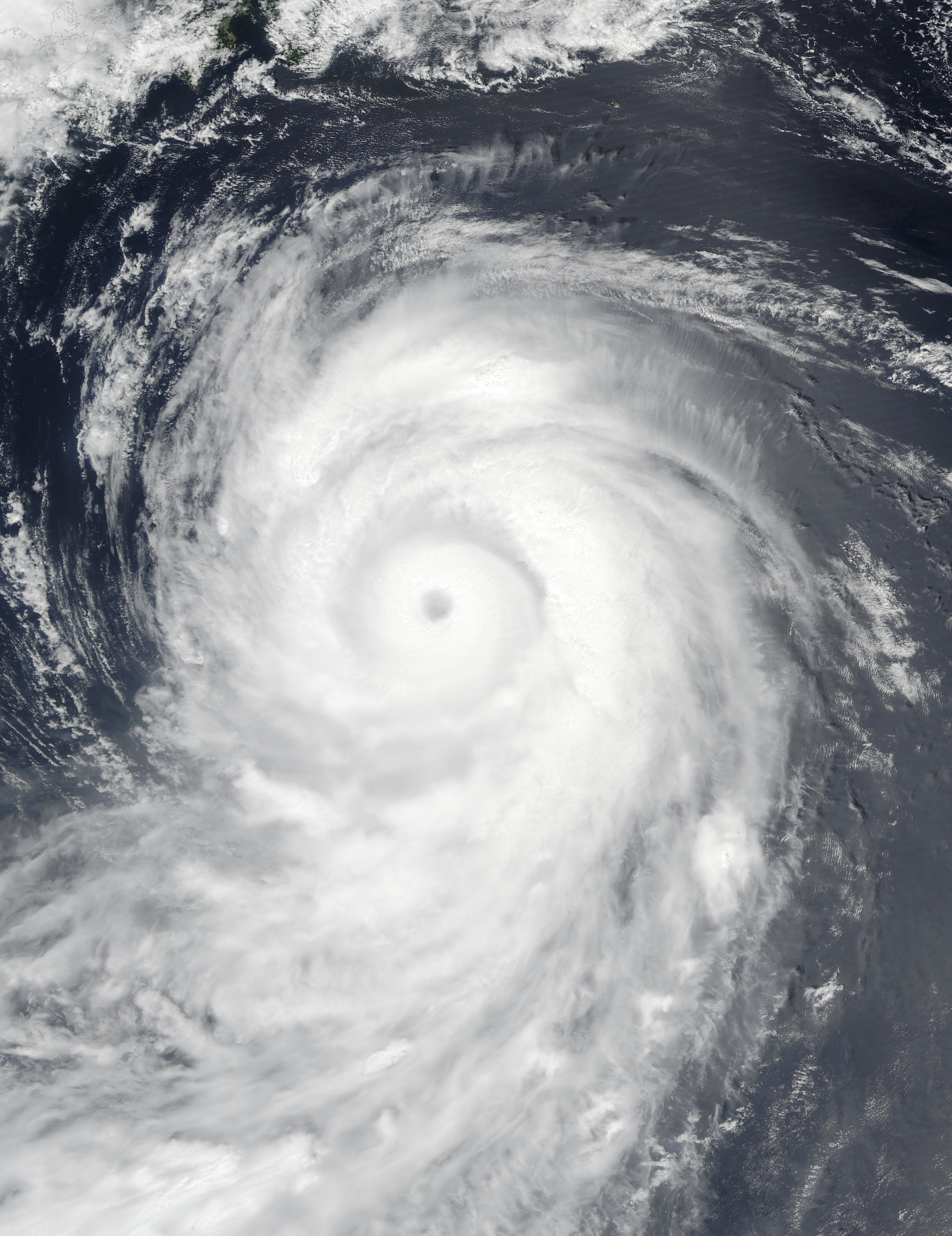
Lionrock shortly after its peak on August 28

August 28

- 00:00 UTC at 26.1°N 136.7°E ― The JTWC reports Typhoon Lionrock reaches higher 1-minute sustained winds of 120 knots (220 km/h; 140 mph).
- 06:00 UTC at 27.7°N 137.9°E ― As it continues to move northeastwards, Typhoon Lionrock reaches a higher peak intensity with 10-minute sustained winds of 90 knots (170 km/h; 100 mph) and a minimum pressure of 940 hPa.
- 18:00 UTC at 29.4°N 140.6°E ― Typhoon Lionrock weakens again to a Category 3 typhoon as it passes north of the Ogasawara Islands.

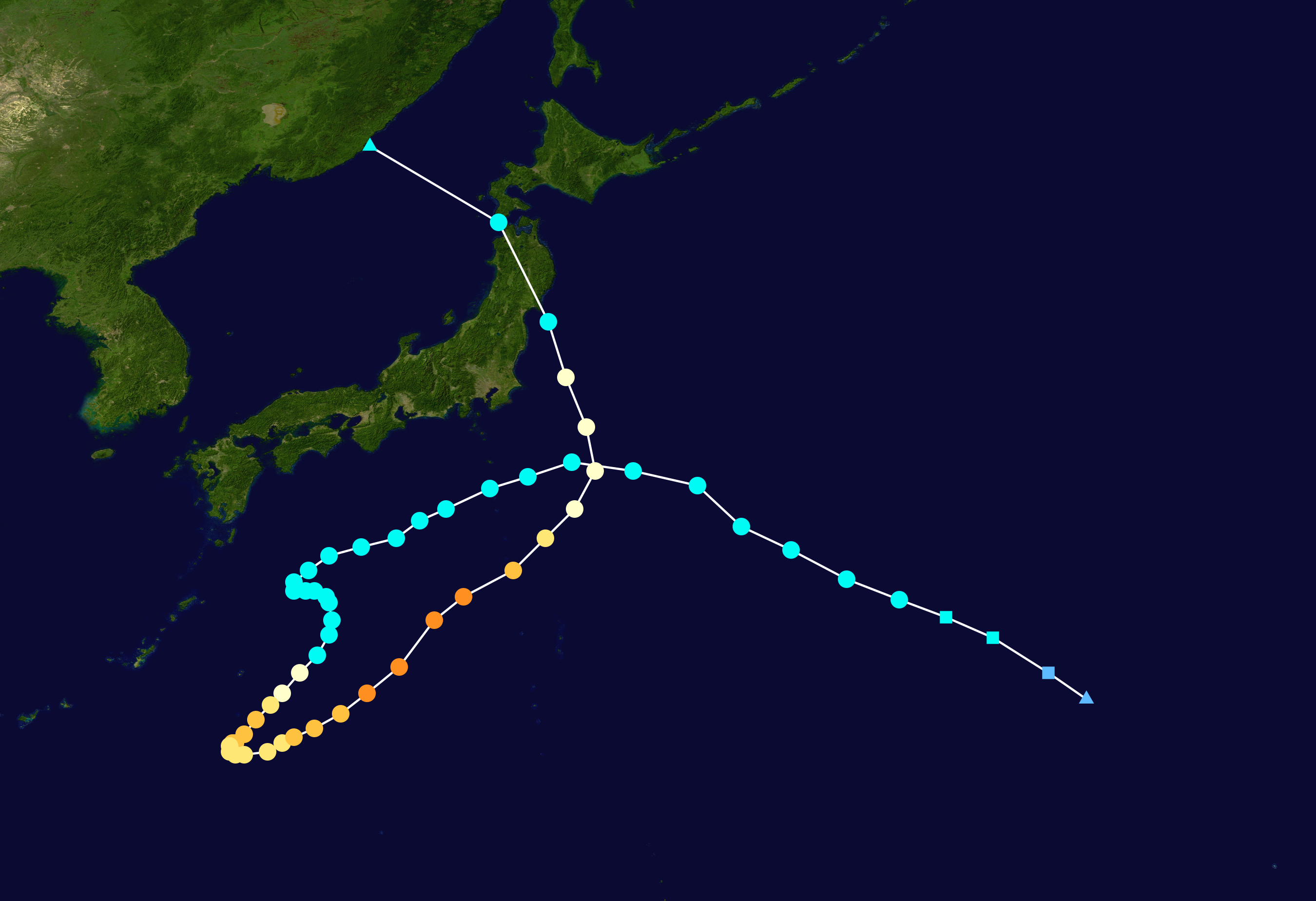
Track of Lionrock during mid-late August

August 29

- 00:00 UTC at 30.5°N 141.7°E ― Typhoon Lionrock further weakens to a low-end Category 2 typhoon.
- 06:00 UTC at 31.5°N 142.7°E ― Typhoon Lionrock continues its weakening trend to a Category 1 typhoon as it finishes its counter-clockwise movement over the past few days while turning to the north.

Lionrock ultimately making its landfall on Japan on August 30

August 30

- 00:00 UTC at 28.2°N 171.1°E ― A tropical depression forms west of Midway Atoll. The JMA assesses the system with a minimum pressure of 1004 hPa.
- 06:00 UTC at 37.9°N 141.8°E ― The JTWC further downgrades Lionrock to a high-end tropical storm as it moves northwestward closer to northeastern Japan.
- 08:30 UTC (17:30 JST) at 39.068°N 141.725222°E― Typhoon Lionrock makes landfall at Ofunato City, Iwate Prefecture.
- 09:00 UTC at 39.3°N 141.7°E ― Having made landfall, Lionrock weakens to a severe tropical storm.
- 09:00 UTC 39.3°N 141.5°E ― The JTWC last notes Lionrock after it had transitioned to an extratropical system, according to their analysis.
- 12:00 UTC at 41.3°N 140.0°E ― Severe Tropical Storm Lionrock emerges over the Sea of Japan as it starts to turn extratropical.
- 15:00 UTC at 42.0°N 138.0°E ― According to the JMA, Lionrock becomes an extratropical system and accelerates northwestward.
- 18:00 UTC at 43.9°N 135.7°E ― The JMA last notes the extratropical remnants of Lionrock as it become absorbed by another extratropical low to its west; the system was fully absorbed six hours later. Consequently, it caused intense rainfall and flooding in North Korea.

August 31

- 00:00 UTC at 21.1°N 123.2°E ― A tropical depression forms east-northeast of Batanes Islands.
- 00:00 UTC at 21.2°N 124.1°E ― The JTWC starts to track the tropical depression east of Batanes, designating it as 15W.
- 06:00 UTC at 30.0°N 177.7°E ― The tropical depression west of Midway Atoll becomes an extratropical system while turning to the northeast.
- 18:00 UTC at 23.2°N 127.4°E ― The JTWC upgrades 16W to a tropical storm as it moves northeast.
- 18:00 UTC at 32.5°N 177.9°W ― The JMA last notes the extratropical remnants of the depression now north of Midway Atoll as it exits the basin.

=== September ===
September 1

- 00:00 UTC at 23.8°N 127.7°E ― The JMA reports 16W has intensified to a tropical storm, naming it Namtheun.
- 00:00 UTC (08:00 PHT) at 23.8°N 127.7°E ― The PAGASA starts tracking on Namtheun as a tropical depression, naming it Enteng.
- 03:00 UTC (11:00 PHT) at 24.0°N 128.0°E ― The PAGASA immediately upgrades Namtheun (Enteng) to a tropical storm as it approaches the northern boundary of the PAR.
- 09:00 UTC at 24.8°N 129.7°E ― The JTWC assesses Namtheun (Enteng) has intensified to a Category 1 typhoon.
- 12:00 UTC at 25.0°N 130.2°E ― Namtheun (Enteng) becomes a severe tropical storm as it turns to the north-northeast.
- 12:00 UTC (20:00 PHT) at 25.0°N 130.2°E ― The PAGASA reports Namtheun (Enteng) has left the PAR as it intensifies to a severe tropical storm with 10-minute sustained winds of 100 kilometres per hour (54 kn; 62 mph).

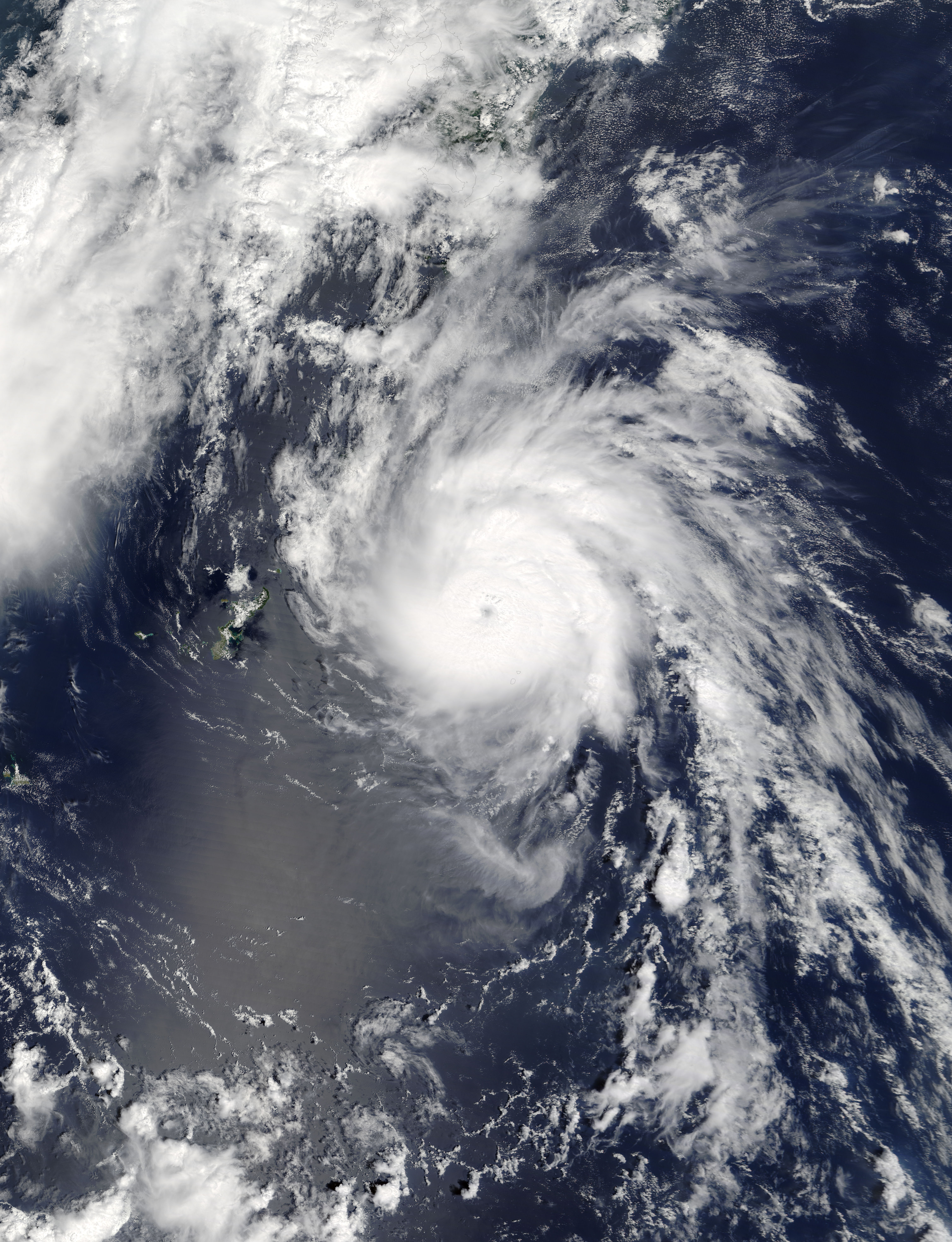
Namtheun strengthening shortly before its peak on September 2 as it moves towards Japan

September 2

- 00:00 UTC at 26.4°N 130.8°E ― The JMA upgrades Namtheun to a typhoon as it moves generally northward.
- 00:00 UTC at 26.4°N 130.8°E ― The JTWC reports Namtheun has strengthened to a Category 2 typhoon.
- 06:00 UTC at 27.2°N 130.8°E ― The JMA assesses Typhoon Namtheun has attained its peak of 10-minute sustained winds of 70 knots (130 km/h; 81 mph).
- 06:00 UTC at 27.2°N 130.8°E ― Typhoon Namtheun strengthens further to a Category 3 typhoon and simultaneously reaches its peak from the JTWC with 1-minute sustained winds of 100 knots (190 km/h; 120 mph).
- 18:00 UTC at 28.5°N 130.6°E ― As it turns to the north-northwest while maintaining its maximum winds, Namtheun's central pressure dropped to 955 hPa as assessed by JMA.
- 18:00 UTC at 28.5°N 130.6°E ― The JTWC downgrades Typhoon Namtheun to a Category 2 typhoon.

September 3

- 06:00 UTC at 29.9°N 130.1°E ― Typhoon Namtheun weakens to a Category 1 typhoon as it approaches Kyushu to the west.
- 12:00 UTC at 30.5°N 129.9°E ― The JMA downgrades Namtheun to a severe tropical storm.
- 18:00 UTC at 31.0°N 129.8°E ― Namtheun weakens to a tropical storm as assessed by the JTWC.

September 4

- 06:00 UTC at 31.8°N 129.6°E ― Now slightly turning back to the north-northwest, Namtheun levels back to tropical storm status per the JMA.
- 16:00 UTC (01:00 JST, September 5) at 32.8°N 129.7°E ― Tropical Storm Namtheun makes landfall on Nagasaki City, Nagasaki Prefecture.
- 18:00 UTC at 33.1°N 129.8°E ― The JMA downgrades Namtheun to a tropical depression as it moves across northwestern Kyushu.
- 18:00 UTC at 33.2°N 129.9°E ― The JTWC follows suit and downgrades Namtheun to a tropical depression.

September 5

- 00:00 UTC at 34.1°N 130.6°E ― The JTWC last notes Tropical Depression Namtheun as it emerged over the Sea of Japan.
- 12:00 UTC at 24.8°N 124.8°E ― A tropical depression forms near the Ryukyu Islands.
- 12:00 UTC at 35.9°N 132.3°E ― The JMA last notes Tropical Depression Namtheun as it becomes absorbed by an extratropical low; the system fully dissipates six hours later.

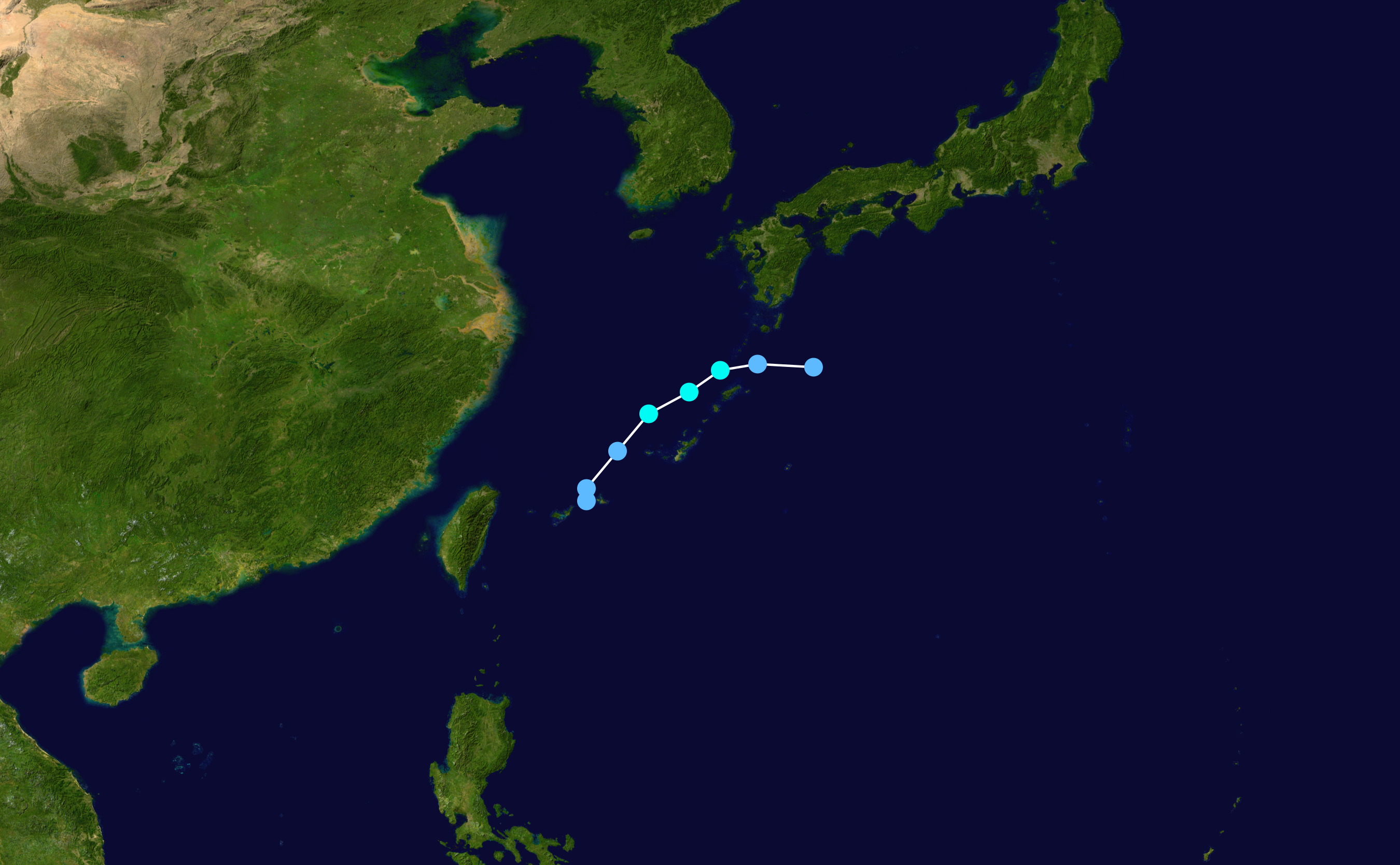
Track of Malou during early September

September 6

- 06:00 UTC at 27.6°N 126.8°E ― The JMA upgrades the tropical depression near the Ryukyu Islands to a tropical storm, naming it Malou while moving to the northeast. Simultaneously, it achieved its peak intensity with 10-minute sustained winds of 40 knots (74 km/h; 46 mph) and a minimum pressure of 1000 hPa.
- 18:00 UTC at 29.0°N 129.1°E ― While maintaining its maximum winds, Malou re-attains its central pressure of 1000 hPa.

September 7

- 00:00 UTC at 29.2°N 130.3°E ― The JMA downgrades Malou to a tropical depression as it turns westward.
- 00:00 UTC at 29.7°N 134.6°E ― The JMA reports the formation of a tropical depression south of Japan, near Tropical Depression Malou.
- 06:00 UTC at 29.1°N 132.1°E ― The JMA last notes Tropical Depression Malou as it interacts with the tropical depression south of Japan; Malou fully dissipates six hours later.

September 8

- 06:00 UTC at 33.3°N 139.9°E ― The JMA last notes the tropical depression south of Japan as it attains a central pressure of 998 hPa while being absorbed by an extratropical cyclone.

September 9

- 00:00 UTC at 13.6°N 143.2°E ― The JTWC reports the formation of Tropical Depression 16W to the west of Guam.
- 12:00 UTC at 13.7°N 141.7°E ― The JMA starts to track on Tropical Depression 16W as it moves west-northwest.
- 12:00 UTC at 26.1°N 130.3°E ― A tropical depression forms near Okinawa.
- 18:00 UTC at 26.6°N 130.9°E ― The JMA assesses the tropical depression near Okinawa has attained a central pressure of 1006 hPa.

September 10

- 00:00 UTC at 30.9°N 150.4°E ― The JMA reports the formation of a tropical depression not far to the east of Japan over the Pacific Ocean.
- 00:00 UTC at 26.9°N 131.0°E ― The JMA last notes the tropical depression near Okinawa. The system weakens to a low-pressure area six hours later.
- 00:00 UTC at 14.8°N 139.7°E ― The JTWC upgrades 16W to a tropical storm.
- 06:00 UTC at 14.8°N 139.2°E ― The JMA follows suit and upgrades 16W to a tropical storm and names it Meranti.
- 06:00 UTC at 32.9°N 142.9°E ― The JTWC marks the tropical depression to the east of Japan as Tropical Depression 17W as it turns to the east.
- 12:00 UTC at 25.3°N 124.5°E ― A tropical depression forms near the southern Ryukyu Islands with a central pressure of 1008 hPa.
- 18:00 UTC at 25.7°N 123.8°E ― The JMA last notes the tropical depression near the southern Ryukyu Islands; the system dissipates six hours later.

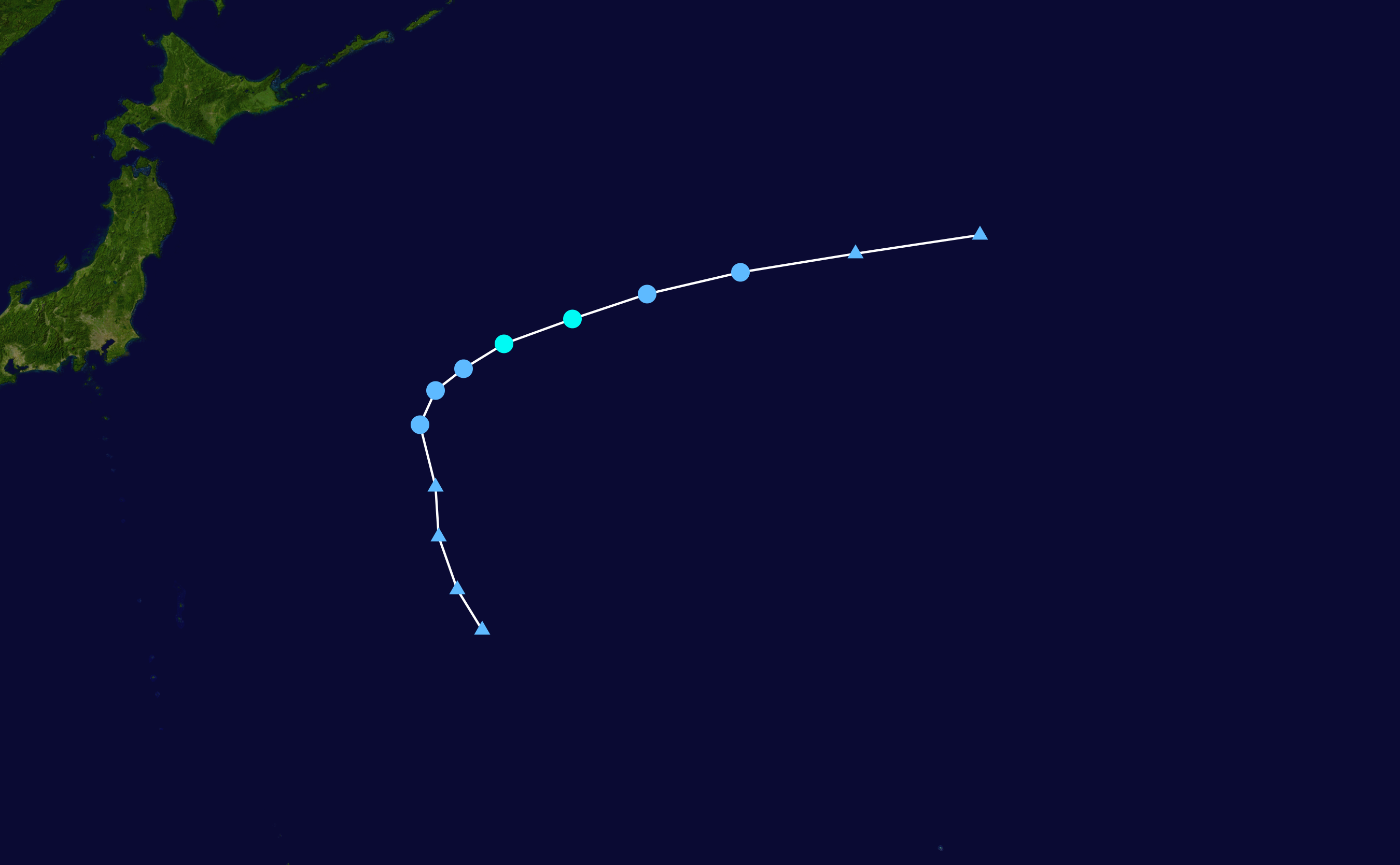
Track of 17W during early September

September 11

- 00:00 UTC at 16.4°N 135.7°E ― Meranti intensifies to a severe tropical storm as it is about to enter the PAR.
- 00:00 UTC at 35.5°N 152.6°E ― The JTWC upgrades 17W to a tropical storm while moving east-northeast, achieving its peak intensity with 1-minute sustained winds of 35 knots (65 km/h; 40 mph).
- 03:00 UTC (11:00 PHT) at 16.5°N 135.2°E ― The PAGASA reports Severe Tropical Storm Ferdie enters the PAR and names it Ferdie.
- 06:00 UTC at 16.7°N 134.5°E ― Meranti (Ferdie) further intensifies to a typhoon.
- 06:00 UTC at 16.8°N 134.5°E ― The JTWC follows suit and upgrades Meranti (Ferdie) to a Category 1 typhoon.
- 06:00 UTC (14:00 PHT) at 16.8°N 134.4°E ― The PAGASA also upgrades Meranti (Ferdie) to a typhoon.
- 06:00 UTC at 36.3°N 154.8°E ― The JMA assesses 17W has attained a central pressure of 1008 hPa.
- 06:00 UTC at 12.3°N 114.3°E ― A tropical depression forms over the South China Sea.
- 12:00 UTC at 17.2°N 133.0°E ― Typhoon Meranti (Ferdie) becomes a Category 2 typhoon as it continues to rapidly intensify.
- 12:00 UTC at 37.1°N 157.2°E ― The JTWC downgrades 17W to a tropical depression as it starts to transition into an extratropical cyclone.
- 15:00 UTC at 12.6°N 145.5°E ― The JTWC reports the formation of Tropical Depression 18W not far to the southeast of Guam.
- 18:00 UTC at 12.5°N 144.8°E ― The JMA starts to track on Tropical Depression 18W.
- 18:00 UTC at 17.6°N 131.7°E ― Typhoon Meranti (Ferdie) further strengthens to a Category 3 typhoon as it traverses the Philippine Sea.
- 18:00 UTC at 13.0°N 113.3°E ― The JTWC designates the tropical depression over the South China Sea as 19W.

September 12

- 00:00 UTC at 17.9°N 130.3°E ― Typhoon Meranti (Ferdie) further strengthens to a Category 4 typhoon as it continues moving west-northwest.
- 00:00 UTC at 38.4°N 163.9°E ― The JMA last notes Tropical Depression 17W as it becomes embedded on a cold front; the system fully embeds six hours later.
- 00:00 UTC at 38.4°N 163.9°E ― The JTWC determines 17W has turned extratropical.
- 00:00 UTC at 13.7°N 112.2°E ― The JTWC assesses Tropical Depression 19W has achieved its peak intensity with 1-minute sustained winds of 30 knots (56 km/h; 35 mph), for which it will hold throughout until after landfall on Vietnam.
- 00:00 UTC at 13.1°N 143.0°E ― The JTWC reports 18W has strengthened to a tropical storm as it moves west-northwest.
- 06:00 UTC at 18.4°N 129.3°E ― The JTWC reports Typhoon Meranti (Ferdie) has rapidly strengthened to a super-typhoon.
- 06:00 UTC (14:00 PHT) at 18.3°N 129.2°E ― The PAGASA also reports Typhoon Meranti (Ferdie) has strengthened to a super-typhoon on their scale.
- 06:00 UTC at 13.4°N 141.7°E ― The JTWC assesses Tropical Storm 18W has attained an initial peak with 1-minute sustained winds of 45 knots (83 km/h; 52 mph).
- 12:00 UTC at 18.9°N 128.1°E ― Super Typhoon Meranti (Ferdie) continues its intensification and becomes a Category 5 super-typhoon.
- 18:00 UTC
- 18:00 UTC (01:00 ICT) at 15.5°N 108.9°E ― The JMA reports 19W has strengthened to a tropical storm, naming it Rai. Simultaneously, it achieved its peak intensity with 10-minute sustained winds of 35 knots (65 km/h; 40 mph) and a central pressure of 996 hPa as it makes landfall on Quảng Nam – Quang Ngai Province, Central Vietnam.
- 18:00 UTC at 13.8°N 139.4°E ― The JMA determines 18W has strengthened to a tropical storm, with the agency naming it Malakas.

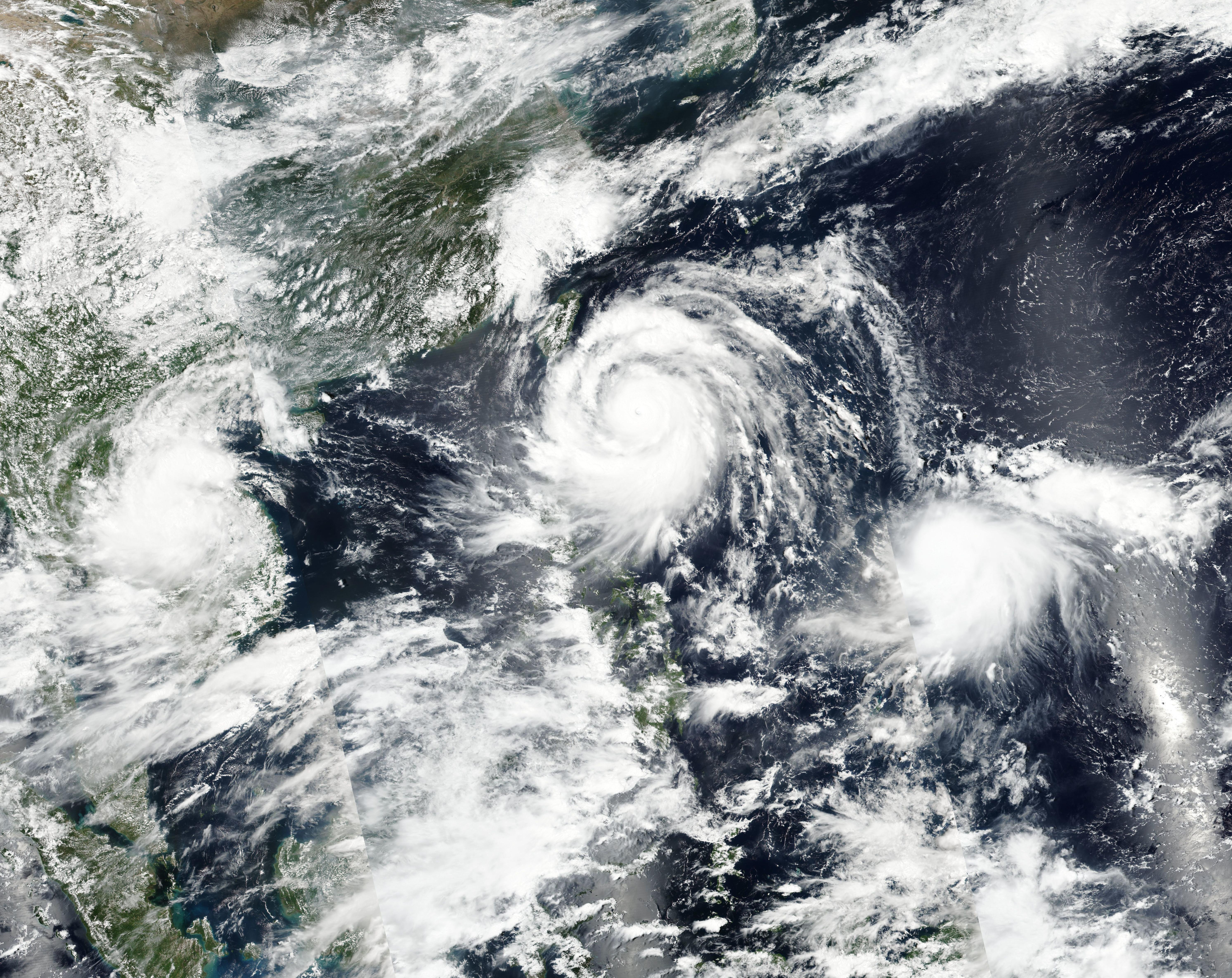
Trio of storms active during September 13. Rai (left) after making landfall in Vietnam, Meranti (middle) threatening the Taiwan-Batanes area, and Malakas (right) intensifying

September 13

- 06:00 UTC at 16.0°N 105.9°E ― The JMA downgrades Rai back to a tropical depression as it traverses over Laos.
- 06:00 UTC at 16.0°N 106.0°E ― The JTWC last notes Tropical Depression Rai.
- 09:00 UTC (17:00 PHT) at 20.3°N 123.5°E ― The PAGASA reports Super Typhoon Meranti (Ferdie) has reached its peak intensity within PAR with 10-minute sustained winds of 220 kilometres per hour (120 kn; 140 mph) as it enters Luzon Strait.
- 12:00 UTC at 20.4°N 122.9°E ― The JMA assesses Typhoon Meranti (Ferdie) has peaked with 10-minute sustained winds of 120 knots (220 km/h; 140 mph) and a central pressure of 890 hPa, becoming one of the most intense typhoons recorded.
- 12:00 UTC at 20.4°N 122.9°E ― The JTWC reports Super Typhoon Meranti (Ferdie) has peaked with 1-minute sustained winds of 170 knots (310 km/h; 200 mph) as it approaches Batanes.
- 16:00 UTC (00:00 PHT, September 14) at 14.9°N 135.0°E ― The PAGASA reports Malakas enters the PAR as a severe tropical storm and was named Gener.
- 16:15 UTC (00:15 PHT, September 14) at 20.7878°N 121.8415°E ― Typhoon Meranti (Ferdie) makes landfall on Itbayat, Batanes.
- 18:00 UTC at 15.0°N 134.6°E ― Tropical Storm Malakas (Gener) intensifies to a severe tropical storm, according to the JMA.
- 18:00 UTC (02:00 PHT, September 14) at 15.0°N 134.7°E ― The PAGASA reports Malakas (Gener) has intensified to a typhoon.
- 18:00 UTC at 16.1°N 103.5°E ― The JMA last notes Tropical Depression Rai over Vietnam; it fully dissipates six hours later.

September 14

- 00:00 UTC at 15.4°N 133.4°E ― The JMA declares Malakas (Gener) is now a typhoon as it traverses the Philippine Sea.
- 00:00 UTC at 15.5°N 133.4°E ― The JTWC determines Malakas (Gener) has strengthened to a Category 1 typhoon.
- 04:30 UTC (12:30 PHT) at 22.4°N 119.8°E ― The PAGASA reports Super Typhoon Meranti (Ferdie) has left the PAR.
- 06:00 UTC at 22.6°N 119.8°E ― The JTWC reports Meranti has drastically weakened to a Category 4 typhoon as it passed well to the southwest of Taiwan.
- 12:00 UTC at 23.4°N 119.0°E ― Typhoon Meranti further weakens to a Category 3 typhoon as it enters Taiwan Strait.
- 18:00 UTC at 24.4°N 118.4°E ― Typhoon Meranti weakens to a Category 2 typhoon as it was about to make landfall in China.
- 18:00 UTC at 16.6°N 129.9°E ― The JTWC reports Typhoon Malakas (Gener) has attained its second peak with 1-minute sustained winds of 75 knots (139 km/h; 86 mph).
- 19:05 UTC (03:05 CST, September 15) at 24.618611°N 118.248056°E ― Typhoon Meranti makes landfall on Xiang'an District, Xiamen, Fujian.

September 15

- 00:00 UTC at 25.2°N 117.7°E ― The JMA assesses Meranti has weakened further to a severe tropical storm as it moved inland.
- 00:00 UTC at 25.3°N 117.6°E ― The JTWC downgrades Meranti further to a Category 1 typhoon.
- 06:00 UTC at 26.1°N 116.9°E ― The JMA further downgrades Meranti to a tropical storm as it turns northeast.
- 06:00 UTC at 26.5°N 116.9°E ― The JTWC last notes Meranti as it further weakens to a tropical storm inland.
- 12:00 UTC at 18.4°N 126.7°E ― After a brief weakening, Typhoon Malakas (Gener) has regained its strength and is now an intensifying Category 2 typhoon.
- 12:00 UTC at 27.0°N 117.1°E ― Now moving north-northeast, Meranti weakens to a tropical depression as it comes into contact with a front.

Malakas at its peak near Taiwan on September 16

September 16

- 06:00 UTC at 21.2°N 123.9°E ― Turning to the north-northwest, Malakas (Gener) becomes a Category 3 typhoon.
- 06:00 UTC at 31.6°N 120.1°E ― The JMA assesses Meranti has turned extratropical after developing fronts.
- 12:00 UTC at 22.1°N 123.4°E ― The JTWC assesses Typhoon Malakas (Gener) has attained its third and best peak with 1-minute sustained winds of 115 knots (213 km/h; 132 mph), making it a Category 4 typhoon.
- 18:00 UTC at 23.0°N 123.1°E ― The JMA assesses Typhoon Malakas (Gener) has attained its peak intensity with 10-minute sustained winds of 95 knots (176 km/h; 109 mph) and a central pressure of 930 hPa as it passes to the east of Taiwan.

September 17

- 00:00 UTC at 24.2°N 123.0°E ― Continuing to move north-northwest, Typhoon Malakas (Gener) weakens to a Category 3 typhoon.
- 00:00 UTC (08:00 PHT) at 24.0°N 122.9°E ― The PAGASA reports Typhoon Malakas (Gener) has attained its peak intensity within PAR with 10-minute sustained winds of 175 kilometres per hour (94 kn; 109 mph).
- 06:00 UTC (14:00 PHT) at 25.2°N 122.7°E ― The PAGASA reports Malakas (Gener) has left the PAR.
- 12:00 UTC at 25.9°N 122.7°E ― Typhoon Malakas rapidly weakens back to a Category 1 typhoon as it slows down.
- 12:00 UTC at 33.2°N 125.2°E ― The JMA last notes the extratropical remnants of Meranti as it dissipates over the Yellow Sea; it fully dissipates six hours later.

September 18

- 06:00 UTC at 27.4°N 124.4°E ― Now moving to the east-northeast, Typhoon Malakas re-intensifies to a Category 2 typhoon as it traverses the East China Sea.
- 18:00 UTC at 28.7°N 126.1°E ― The JMA reports Typhoon Malakas has attained a secondary peak with 10-minute sustained winds of 95 knots (176 km/h; 109 mph) and a central pressure of 940 hPa as it moves closer to Japan.
- 18:00 UTC at 28.7°N 126.2°E ― Typhoon Malakas continues to intensify and regains Category 3 typhoon status.

September 19

- 00:00 UTC at 29.4°N 127.2°E ― The JTWC assesses Typhoon Malakas peaked for the last time as a Category 3 typhoon with 1-minute sustained winds of 110 knots (200 km/h; 130 mph) as it approaches Kyushu.
- 15:00 UTC (00:00 JST, September 20) at 31.1°N 130.5°E ― Typhoon Malakas makes its first landfall on the Ōsumi Peninsula, Kagoshima Prefecture.
- 18:00 UTC at 31.6°N 131.5°E ― As Malakas starts to move along the southern Japanese coastline, the JTWC assesses the system weakens back to a Category 1 typhoon for the final time.

September 20

- 04:00 UTC at 33.7°N 135.1°E ― Affected by land interaction and developing fronts, Malakas weakens down to a severe tropical storm as it closes in on another landfall.
- 04:30 UTC (13:30 JST) at 33.733333°N 135.383333°E ― Severe Tropical Storm Malakas makes its second landfall on Tanabe City, Wakayama Prefecture.
- 06:00 UTC at 34.2°N 136.0°E ― The JTWC downgrades Malakas to a tropical storm as it starts its extratropical transition.
- 08:00 UTC (17:00 JST) at 34.9°N 136.8°E ― Malakas makes its third landfall on Tokoname City, Aichi Prefecture as the JMA downgrades it to a tropical storm.
- 12:00 UTC at 34.5°N 138.1°E ― The JMA last notes Malakas as it turns extratropical off the coast of Tōkai region; the system did not last long as it dissipated six hours later.
- 12:00 UTC at 35.4°N 138.7°E ― The JTWC stops tracking on Malakas as it has completed its extratropical transition.

September 22

- 18:00 UTC at 15.4°N 141.1°E ― A tropical depression has formed to the west-northwest of Guam.
- 18:00 UTC at 15.3°N 140.5°E ― The JTWC designates the tropical depression to the west-northwest of Guam as 20W.

September 23

- 12:00 UTC at 17.3°N 137.9°E ― The JTWC upgrades 20W to a tropical storm as it continues on a northwestward track.
- 18:00 UTC at 16.9°N 137.6°E ― The JMA assesses 20W has intensified to a tropical storm and the agency names it Megi.

September 24

- 08:00 UTC (16:00 PHT) at 18.5°N 135.0°E ― The PAGASA reports Megi has entered the PAR as a severe tropical storm and names the system, Helen.
- 12:00 UTC at 18.7°N 133.9°E ― Megi (Helen) further strengthens to a severe tropical storm, according to the JMA.
- 12:00 UTC at 18.4°N 134.0°E ― The JTWC reports Megi (Helen) has strengthened to a Category 1 typhoon.
- 12:00 UTC (20:00 PHT) at 18.7°N 133.9°E ― The PAGASA upgrades Megi (Helen) to a typhoon as it traverses the Philippine Sea.
- 18:00 UTC at 19.0°N 132.9°E ― The JMA follows suit and upgrades Megi (Helen) to a typhoon.
- 18:00 UTC at 14.9°N 164.6°E ― The JMA starts to track on a tropical depression that had formed several kilometers east-northeast of Guam.

September 25

- 06:00 UTC at 19.8°N 130.4°E ― Typhoon Megi (Helen) strengthens to a Category 2 typhoon.

September 26

- 06:00 UTC at 21.4°N 126.2°E ― Typhoon Megi (Helen) gradually strengthens to a Category 3 typhoon as it closes in on Taiwan.
- 18:00 UTC (02:00 PHT, September 27) at 22.2°N 124.3°E ― The PAGASA assesses Typhoon Megi (Helen) has attained its peak intensity within the PAR with 10-minute sustained winds of 160 kilometres per hour (86 kn; 99 mph).
- 21:00 UTC at 22.8°N 123.7°E ― The JTWC assesses Typhoon Megi (Helen) has peaked as a Category 4 typhoon with 1-minute sustained winds of 120 knots (220 km/h; 140 mph).

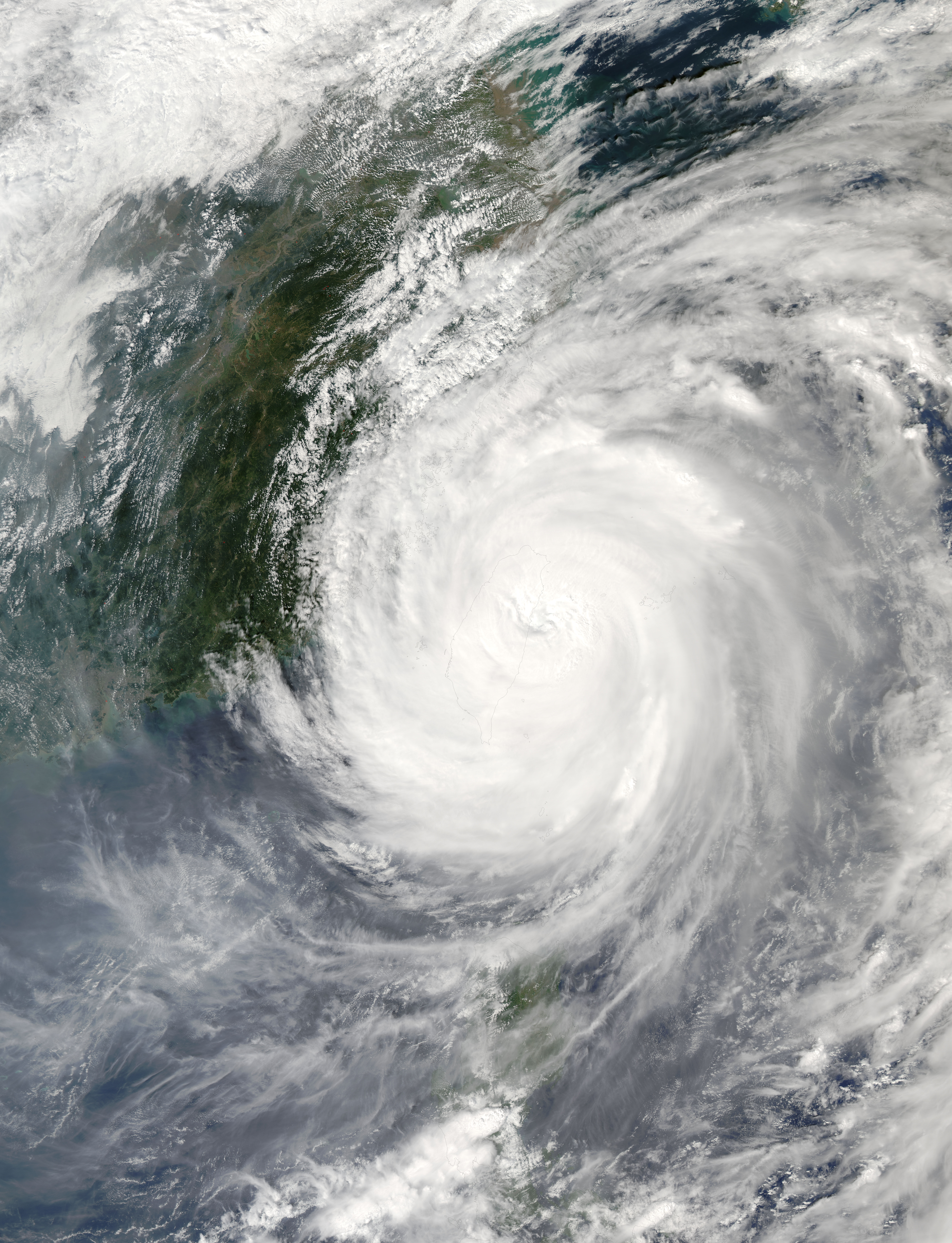
Megi about to make landfall on Taiwan on September 27

September 27

- 00:00 UTC at 23.3°N 123.3°E ― The JMA assesses Typhoon Megi (Helen) has peaked with 10-minute sustained winds of 85 knots (157 km/h; 98 mph) and a central pressure of 945 hPa as it nears landfall.
- 00:00 UTC at 14.7°N 153.3°E ― As the tropical depression continues its generally westward heading, the JTWC designates it as 21W.
- 06:00 UTC (14:00 TST) at 24.1°N 121.6°E ― Typhoon Megi (Helen) makes landfall on Hualien City, Hualien County.
- 06:00 UTC at 24.0°N 121.8°E ― The JTWC downgrades Megi (Helen) to a Category 3 typhoon as it makes landfall.
- 12:00 UTC at 24.0°N 120.7°E ― Interacting with the mountains of Taiwan, Typhoon Megi (Helen) rapidly weakens to a Category 1 typhoon.
- 14:00 UTC at 23.7°N 120.1°E ― Typhoon Megi (Helen) emerges over Taiwan Strait.
- 15:00 UTC (23:00 PHT) at 24.0°N 119.9°E ― The PAGASA reports Typhoon Megi (Helen) has left the PAR.
- 18:00 UTC at 24.4°N 119.6°E ― The JMA downgrades Megi to a severe tropical storm as it nears the Chinese coastline.
- 18:00 UTC at 24.8°N 119.4°E ― The JTWC downgrades Megi to a tropical storm.
- 20:40 UTC (04:40 CST, September 28) at 24.983333°N 118.8°E ― Megi makes landfall on Hui'an County, Quanzhou, Fujian.

September 28

- 00:00 UTC at 25.0°N 118.1°E ― The JMA assesses Megi has weakened further to a tropical storm.
- 12:00 UTC at 25.4°N 116.7°E ― Moving further inland, Megi weakens to a tropical depression.
- 12:00 UTC at 25.2°N 116.0°E ― The JTWC last notes Megi as it further weakens inland.

September 29

- 06:00 UTC at 13.7°N 141.8°E ― After clipping through the Northern Mariana Islands, 21W intensifies to a tropical storm with the JMA naming it Chaba
- 06:00 UTC at 14.1°N 141.4°E ― The JTWC follows suit and upgrades Chaba to a tropical storm.
- 06:00 UTC at 26.5°N 117.2°E ― The JMA last notes Megi as it turns northeast and embeds on a stationary front; the system was fully embedded six hours later.

September 30

- 00:00 UTC at 13.8°N 138.1°E ― Now taking on a more northwesterly path, Chaba strengthens to a severe tropical storm.

=== October ===
October 1

- 02:00 UTC (10:00 PHT) at 16.2°N 135.0°E ― The PAGASA reports Severe Tropical Storm Chaba has entered PAR and was named Igme.
- 12:00 UTC at 17.6°N 133.4°E ― The JMA declares Chaba (Igme) has strengthened further to a typhoon.
- 12:00 UTC at 17.6°N 133.7°E ― The JTWC follows suit and upgrades Chaba (Igme) to a Category 1 typhoon.
- 18:00 UTC at 18.5°N 132.7°E ― The JTWC upgrades Chaba (Igme) to a Category 2 typhoon as it continues its rapid strengthening.
- 18:00 UTC (02:00 PHT, October 2) at 18.6°N 132.6°E ― The PAGASA also declares Chaba (Igme) has strengthened further to a typhoon.

October 2

- 00:00 UTC at 19.7°N 131.5°E ― Typhoon Chaba (Igme) strengthens further to a Category 3 typhoon.
- 06:00 UTC at 20.8°N 130.4°E ― Typhoon Chaba (Igme) intensifies into a Category 4 typhoon as it continues its strengthening trend.

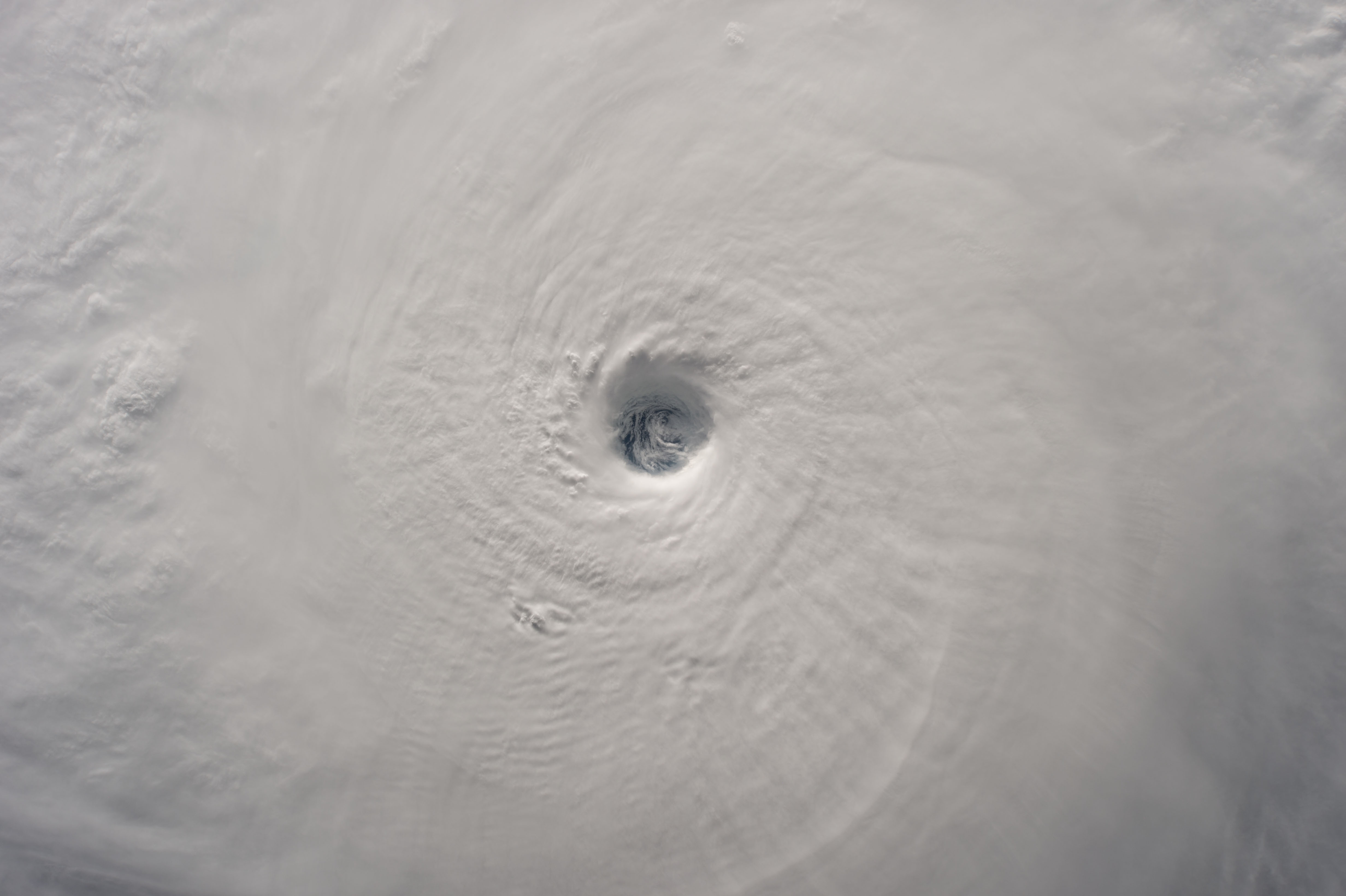
Eye of Chaba seen from the International Space Station (ISS) on October 3.

October 3

- 00:00 UTC at 23.9°N 127.6°E ― After briefly maintaining its intensity, Typhoon Chaba (Igme) becomes a super-typhoon according from the JTWC.
- 06:00 UTC at 25.0°N 127.0°E ― The JTWC assesses Super Typhoon Chaba (Igme) attains Category 5 super typhoon status and peaked with 1-minute sustained winds of 150 knots (280 km/h; 170 mph).
- 06:00 UTC (14:00 PHT) at 24.9°N 127.0°E ― The PAGASA reports Typhoon Chaba (Igme) reached its peak intensity within the PAR with 10-minute sustained winds of 195 kilometres per hour (105 kn; 121 mph), making the system a super-typhoon.
- 06:45 UTC (14:45 PHT) ― The PAGASA reports Super Typhoon Chaba (Igme) has left the PAR.
- 09:00 UTC at 25.4°N 126.9°E ― The JMA reports Typhoon Chaba has attained its peak intensity with 10-minute sustained winds of 115 knots (213 km/h; 132 mph) and a central pressure of 905 hPa as it passes close to Okinawa.
- 18:00 UTC at 26.8°N 126.4°E ― Steering to the north, Chaba weakens to a Category 4 super-typhoon as it enters East China Sea.

October 4

- 00:00 UTC at 27.9°N 126.2°E ― The JTWC downgrades Chaba to a Category 4 typhoon.
- 00:00 UTC at 16.5°N 178.8°E ― The JMA reports a tropical depression has entered the basin from the Central Pacific, located approximately 1,333 kilometers east-southeast of Wake Island.
- 06:00 UTC at 16.4°N 177.6°E ― The tropical depression located to the east-southeast of Wake Island attains a central pressure of 1006 hPa as it continues to travel west.
- 12:00 UTC at 30.8°N 125.9°E ― As Chaba heads to South Korea, the system rapidly weakens to a Category 2 typhoon.
- 12:00 UTC at 19.2°N 130.0°E ― A tropical depression forms over the Philippine Sea.
- 18:00 UTC (02:00 PHT, October 5) at 18.9°N 128.5°E ― The PAGASA designates the tropical depression over the Philippine Sea with a local name, Julian, as it formed within the PAR.

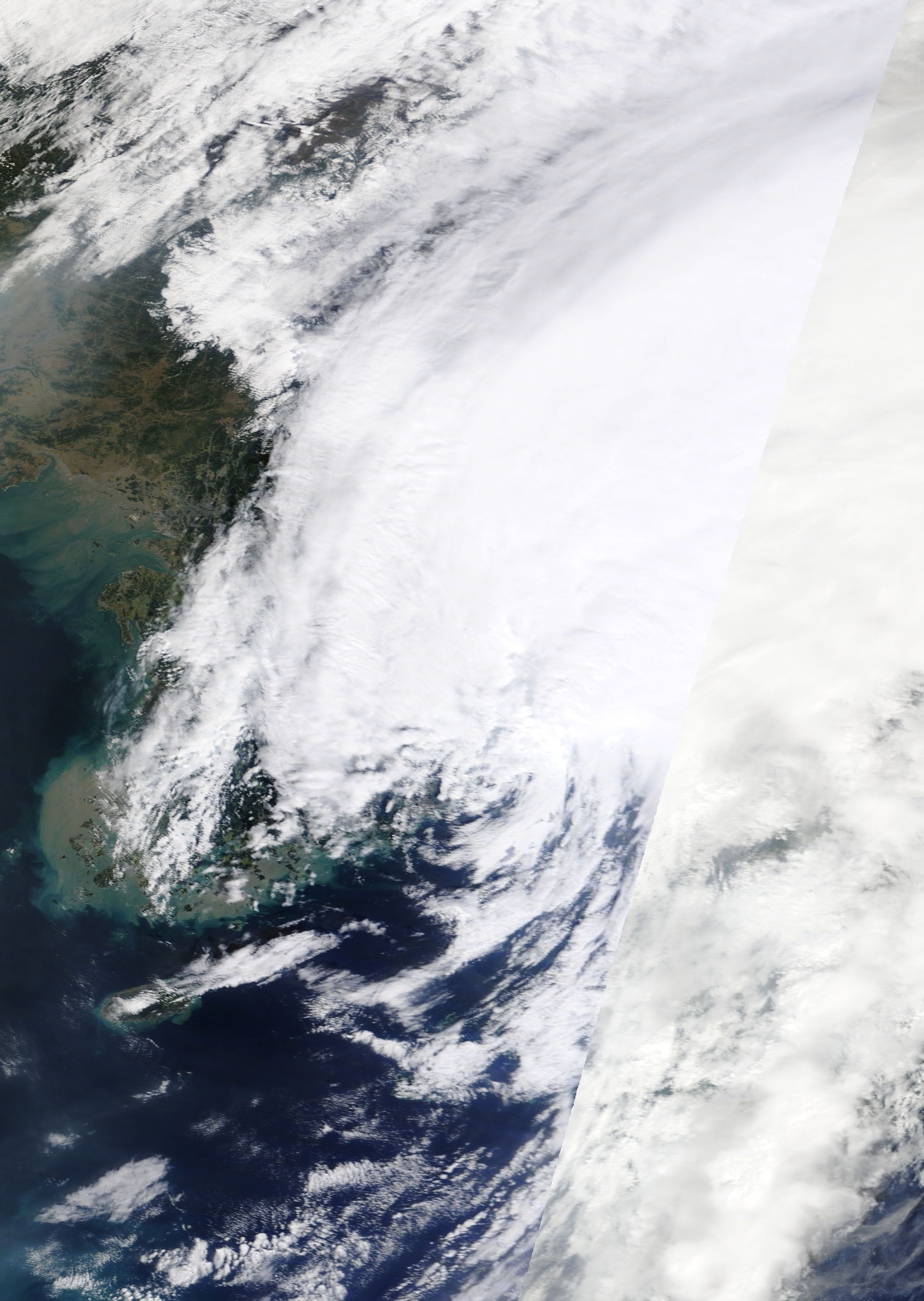
Chaba after landfall on South Korea on October 5.

October 5

- 00:00 UTC at 34.3°N 128.2°E ― Typhoon Chaba further weakens to a Category 1 typhoon after it passes close to Jeju Island and approaches the Korean peninsula.
- 01:00 UTC (10:00 KST) at 34.858056°N 128.618333°E ― Typhoon Chaba makes landfall on Geoje Island, Geoje, South Gyeongsang Province.
- 02:00 UTC (11:00 KST) at 35.18°N 129.075°E ― After an hour, Typhoon Chaba strikes Busan.
- 03:00 UTC at 35.4°N 129.4°E ― As it emerges over the Sea of Japan, Chaba weakens to a severe tropical storm.
- 06:00 UTC at 36.2°N 131.3°E ― The JTWC determines Chaba has turned extratropical.
- 06:00 UTC at 19.9°N 125.0°E ― The JTWC designates Tropical Depression Julian with the identifier 22W.
- 09:00 UTC at 57.3°N 133.8°E ― As the system undergoes extratropical transition, the JMA assesses Chaba has further weakened to a tropical storm.
- 12:00 UTC at 38.7°N 136.7°E ― The JMA reports Chaba has turned extratropical as it races to the northeast, about to cross the northern part of Honshu.
- 12:00 UTC (20:00 PHT) at 19.5°N 123.7°E ― The PAGASA determines Tropical Depression Julian has intensified to a tropical storm as it was about to enter Luzon Strait.
- 18:00 UTC at 20.1°N 122.1°E ― The JMA upgrades Julian to a tropical storm, designating it as Tropical Storm Aere.
- 18:00 UTC (02:00 PHT, October 6) at 19.9°N 122.6°E ― The PAGASA assesses Tropical Storm Aere (Julian) has reached its peak intensity within PAR with 10-minute sustained winds of 85 kilometres per hour (46 kn; 53 mph) as the system crosses Balintang Channel.
- 18:00 UTC at 17.9°N 170.3°E ― As the tropical depression is about to cross the 170th longitude, the system now to the southeast of Wake Island re-attains a central pressure of 1006 hPa.

October 6

- 06:00 UTC aty 20.4°N 118.8°E ― The JTWC upgrades Aere (Julian) to a tropical storm as the system starts to decelerate.
- 06:00 UTC (14:00 PHT) at 20.6°N 119.0°E ― The PAGASA reports Tropical Storm Aere (Julian) has left the PAR after the system crossed Luzon Strait.

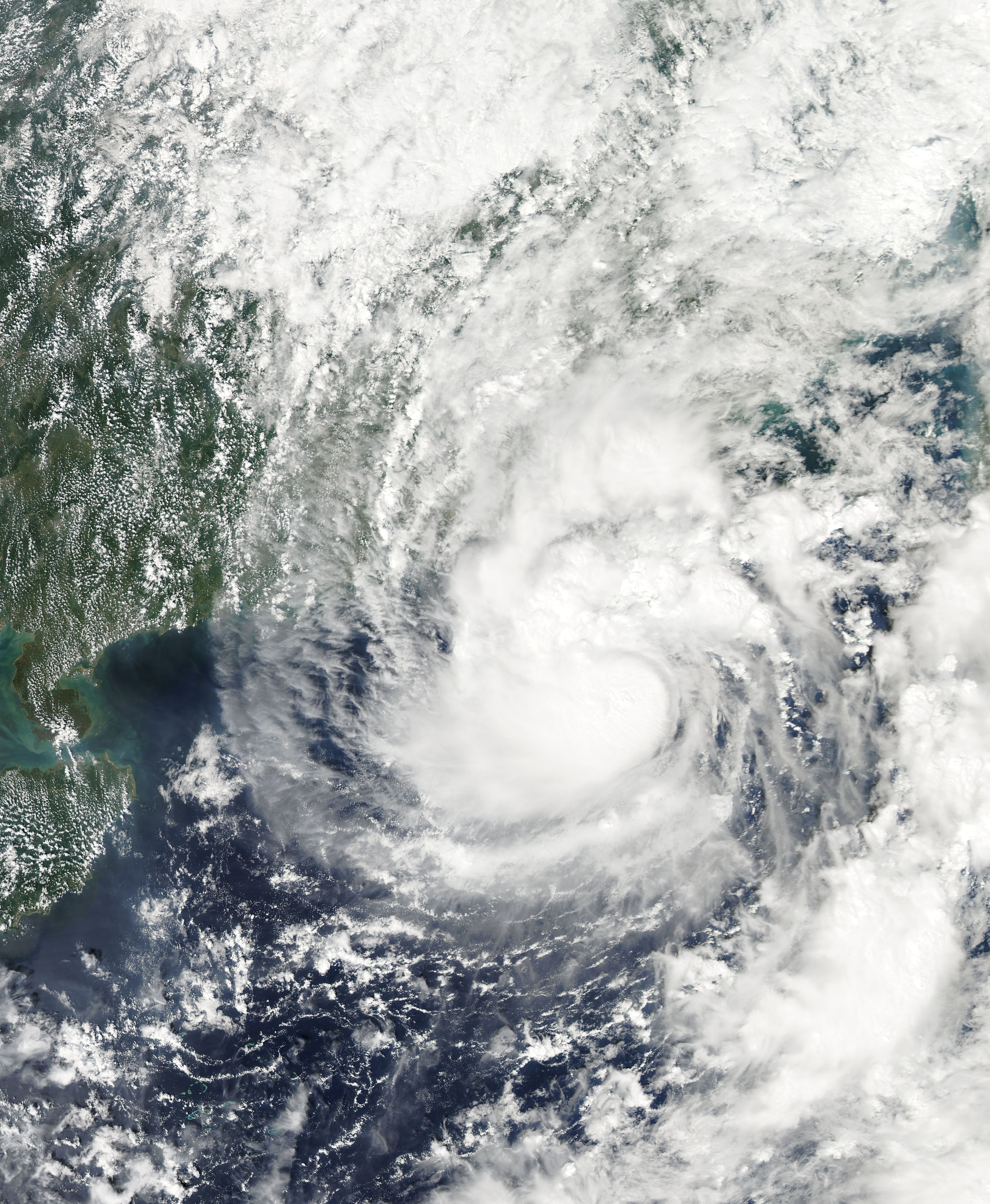
Aere meandering and strengthening over the northern South China Sea on October 7.

October 7

- 00:00 UTC at 18.0°N 163.2°E ― After passing south of Wake Island, the tropical depression is designated 23W by the JTWC.
- 06:00 UTC at 20.7°N 116.0°E ― Aere further strengthens to a severe tropical storm as it slowly moves to the northwest.
- 12:00 UTC at 20.7°N 116.2°E ― The JTWC assesses Tropical Storm Aere has reached its peak intensity with 1-minute sustained winds of 55 knots (102 km/h; 63 mph).
- 18:00 UTC at 21.2°N 115.9°E ― The JMA reports Severe Tropical Storm Aere has peaked with 10-minute sustained winds of 60 knots (110 km/h; 69 mph) and a central pressure of 975 hPa as it slowly turns to the east.
- 18:00 UTC at 52.0°N 177.6°W ― The JMA last notes the extratropical remains of Chaba as it leaves the basin and approaches the Aleutian Islands.

October 8

- 12:00 UTC at 19.9°N 154.4°E ― The JMA upgrades Tropical Depression 23W into a tropical storm and names it Songda.
- 12:00 UTC at 21.6°N 116.9°E ― Aere weakens to a tropical storm as it slowly and erratically moves to the east over the northern South China Sea.
- 18:00 UTC at 20.7°N 152.6°E ― The JTWC follows suit and upgrades Songda to a tropical storm as the system takes on a northwesterly track.

October 9

- 00:00 UTC at 21.6°N 117.5°E ― Tropical Storm Aere attains a second peak intensity with 1-minute sustained winds of 45 knots (83 km/h; 52 mph) as it continues its almost stationary motion.
- 18:00 UTC at 24.0°N 147.3°E ― Tropical Storm Songda intensifies to a severe tropical storm.
- 18:00 UTC at 21.6°N 117.8°E ― The JTWC downgrades Aere to a tropical depression as it encounters unfavorable conditions.

October 10

- 00:00 UTC at 24.7°N 146.4°E ― The JMA upgrades Songda to a typhoon as it slowly shifts to a north-northwesterly movement.
- 00:00 UTC at 24.6°N 146.3°E ― The JTWC follows suit and upgrades Songda to a Category 1 typhoon.
- 00:00 UTC at 22.1°N 118.0°E ― The JMA follows suit and downgrades Aere to a tropical depression.
- 06:00 UTC aty 25.5°N 145.9°E ― Typhoon Songda becomes a Category 2 typhoon as it continues to rapidly intensify while it turns to the north.
- 06:00 UTC at 21.6°N 117.3°E ― Tropical Depression Aere weakens to a remnant low.
- 12:00 UTC at 26.4°N 145.9°E ― Typhoon Songda further intensifies to a Category 3 typhoon.
- 18:00 UTC at 27.2°N 145.8°E ― The JMA reports Typhoon Songda attains an initial peak intensity with 10-minute sustained winds of 95 knots (176 km/h; 109 mph) and a central pressure of 930 hPa.
- 18:00 UTC at 27.2°N 145.9°E ― The JTWC asseses Typhoon Songda has strengthened to a Category 4 typhoon and peaked initially with 1-minute sustained winds of 115 knots (213 km/h; 132 mph).

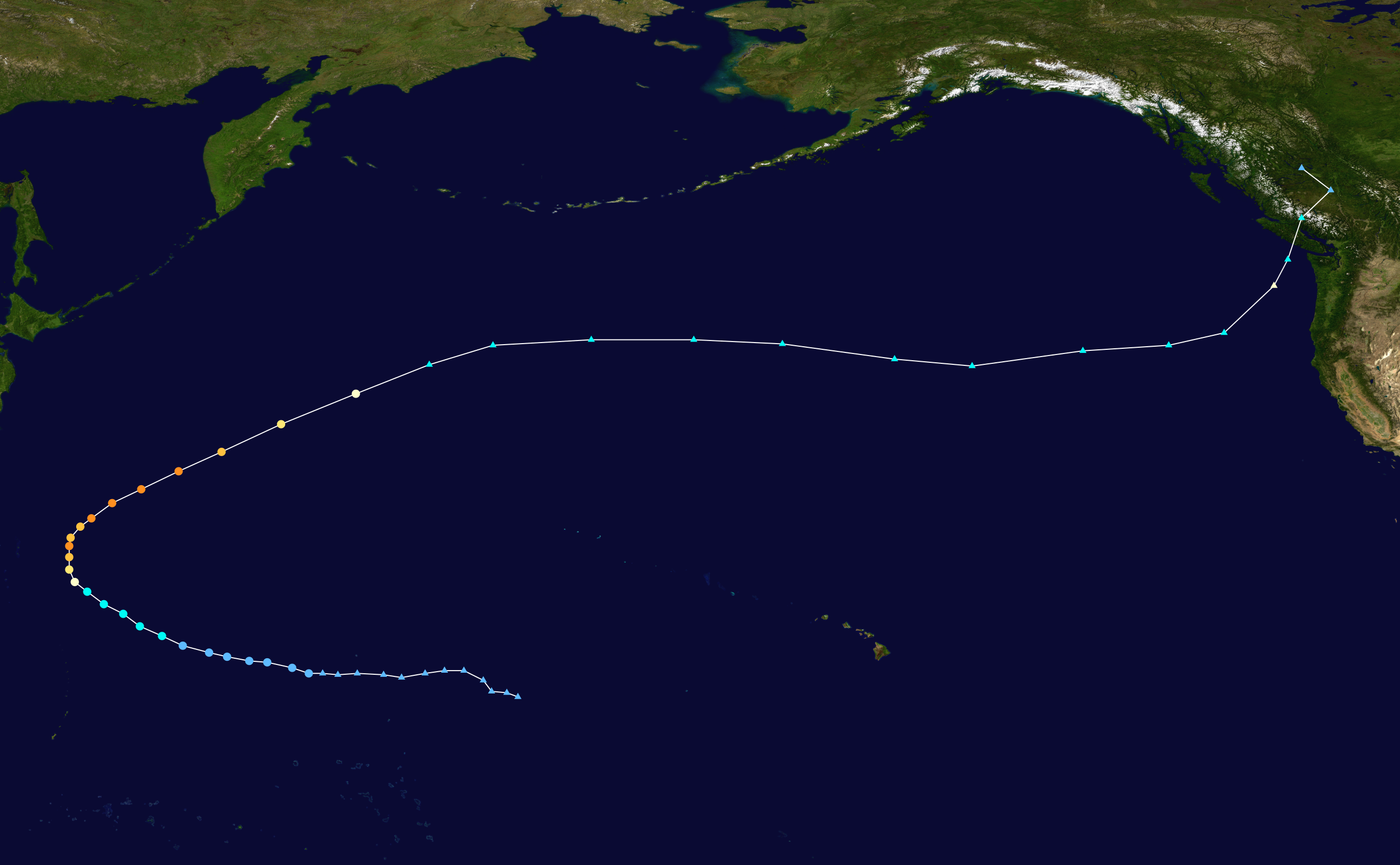
Track of Songda during early-mid October.

October 11

- 00:00 UTC at 27.8°N 146.0°E ― Typhoon Songda weakens back to a Category 3 typhoon as it starts to turn to the northeast.
- 00:00 UTC at 20.1°N 115.6°E ― The JTWC reports Tropical Depression Aere weakens to a weather disturbance, but is closely monitored for signs of regeneration.
- 12:00 UTC at 29.2°N 147.5°E ― Typhoon Songda rebounded back to being a Category 4 typhoon as it starts to pick up speed.
- 18:00 UTC at 30.3°N 148.9°E ― The JMA reports Typhoon Songda attained a higher peak intensity with 10-minute sustained winds of 100 knots (190 km/h; 120 mph) and a central pressure of 925 hPa.
- 18:00 UTC at 30.3°N 149.0°E ― The JTWC assesses Typhoon Songda became a Category 4 super typhoon and attains a higher peak with 1-minute sustained winds of 130 knots (240 km/h; 150 mph).

October 12

- 00:00 UTC at 31.3°N 151.1°E ― Super Typhoon Songda starts to lose strength as it attaches to a stationary front, weakening back to a Category 4 typhoon.
- 12:00 UTC at 34.0°N 156.9°E ― The JTWC downgrades Typhoon Songda further to a Category 3 typhoon as it races to the northeast.
- 18:00 UTC (02:00 PHT, October 13) at 12.5°N 130.8°E ― The PAGASA reports the formation of Tropical Depression Karen over the Philippine Sea east of Northern Samar.
- 18:00 UTC at 17°N 112°E― The JMA reports the remnants of Aere has re-intensified to a tropical depression with a central pressure of 1004 hPa.
- 18:00 UTC at 16.4°N 111.0°E ― The JTWC also reports the remnants of Aere has reintensified to a tropical depression.
- 18:00 UTC at 36.0°N 161.2°E ― As the typhoon develops frontal features, Songda weakens to a Category 2 typhoon.

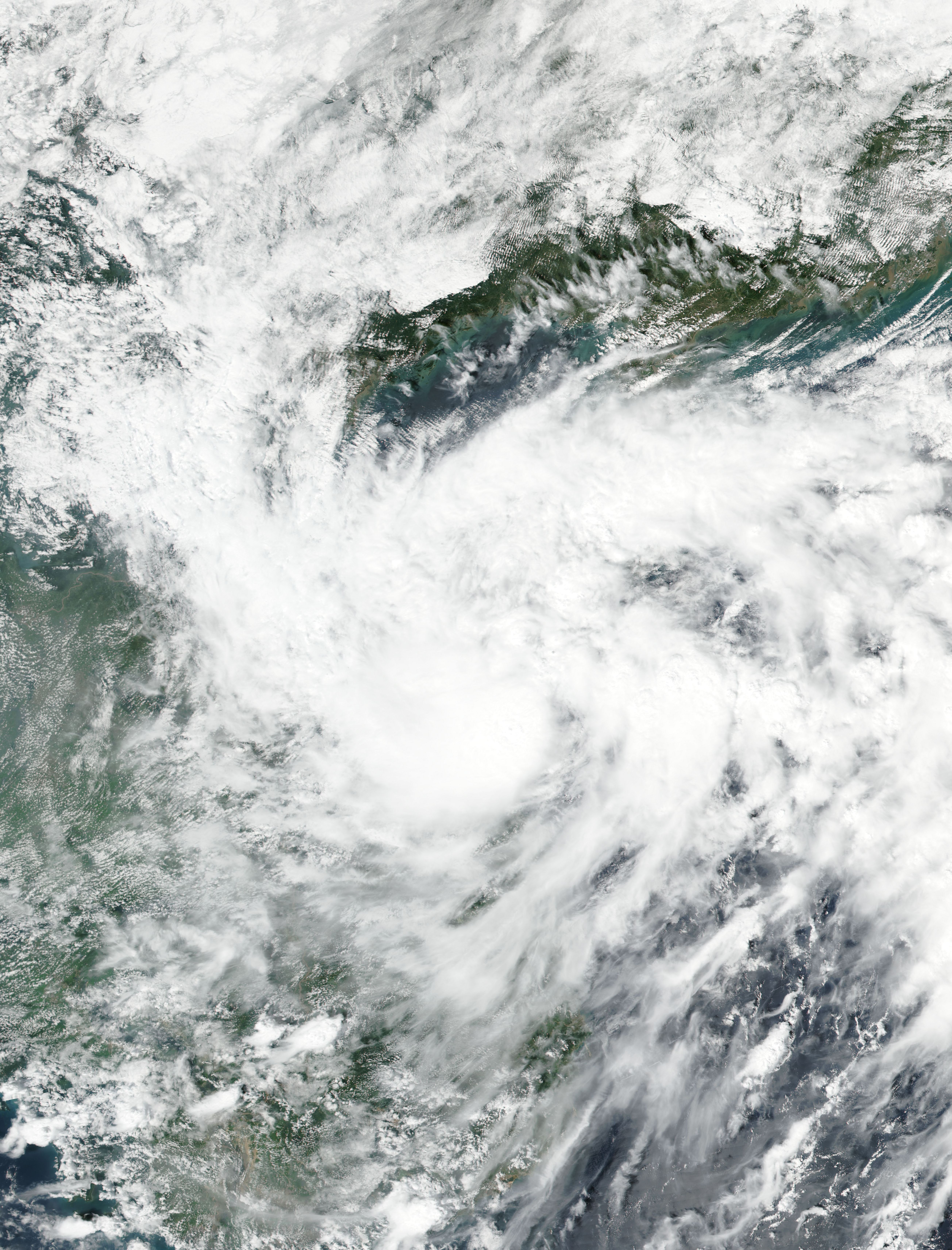
Aere hours before hitting Vietnam on October 13.

October 13

- 00:00 UTC at 12.9°N 129.4°E ― The JMA tracks on Karen as a tropical depression as it slowly moves to the west.
- 00:00 UTC at 38.2°N 166.6°E ― The JTWC declares Songda has turned extratropical.
- 06:00 UTC at 40.3°N 171.1°E ― The JMA reports Typhoon Songda has transitioned to an extratropical cyclone.
- 06:00 UTC at 13.4°N 130.0°E ― The JTWC designates Tropical Depression Karen as 24W.
- 12:00 UTC at 16.6°N 108.3°E ― The JTWC assesses Aere to have intensified again to tropical storm status, simultaneously achieving a third peak with 1-minute sustained winds of 35 knots (65 km/h; 40 mph).
- 12:00 UTC at (20:00 PHT) at 13.7°N 128.5°E ― The PAGASA upgrades Karen to a tropical storm.
- 18:00 UTC (01:00 ICT, October 14) at 16.4637°N 107.5909°E ― Aere makes landfall on Thua Thien Hue, Central Vietnam.
- 18:00 UTC at 16.7°N 107.9°E ― The JMA assesses Tropical Depression Aere attains a second peak with 10-minute sustained winds of 30 knots (56 km/h; 35 mph) and 1000 hPa.
- 18:00 UTC at 13.5°N 127.3°E ― The JMA follows suit, upgrading Karen to a tropical storm and naming it Sarika
- 18:00 UTC at 14.2°N 128.2°E ― The JTWC also upgrades Sarika (Karen) to a tropical storm as it decelerates.
- 18:00 UTC at 42.1°N 176.4°W ― The extratropical remnants of Songda leaves the basin. It would later affect the Pacific Northwest region and was dubbed as the Ides of October storm.

October 14

- 00:00 UTC at 16.7°N 106.7°E ― The JTWC downgrades Aere to a tropical depression for the final time as it moves further inland.
- 06:00 UTC (14:00 PHT) at 13.8°N 126.3°E ― The PAGASA upgrades Sarika (Karen) to a severe tropical storm.
- 12:00 UTC at 13.8°N 125.9°E ― The JMA reports Sarika (Karen) has strengthened to a severe tropical storm.
- 12:00 UTC at 13.9°N 125.9°E ― The PAGASA upgrades Sarika (Karen) to a typhoon while maintaining its westward heading.
- 12:00 UTC at 16.9°N 104.4°E ― The JMA last notes Tropical Depression Aere as it finally weakens; the system dissipates six hours later.
- 12:00 UTC at 16.9°N 104.4°E ― The JTWC follows suit and last notes Tropical Depression Aere.
- 12:00 UTC at 7.4°N 144.5°E ― A tropical depression forms around the Caroline Islands.
- 18:00 UTC at 14.0°N 125.2°E ― Sarika (Karen) has intensified to a Category 1 typhoon as it turns to the west-northwest, according to the JTWC.
- 18:00 UTC at 8.3°N 144.4°E ― The JTWC designates the tropical depression near the Caroline Islands as 25W.

Sarika about to make landfall on Luzon on October 15.

October 15

- 00:00 UTC at 14.3°N 124.6°E ― The JMA follows suit and upgrades Sarika (Karen) to a typhoon while gradually accelerating, passing north of Catanduanes.
- 00:00 UTC at 8.8°N 142.9°E ― As 25W continues to move west-northwest, the system intensifies to a tropical storm, gaining the name Haima.
- 06:00 UTC at 14.8°N 123.8°E ― Typhoon Sarika (Karen) intensifies to a Category 2 typhoon as it moves closer to Central Luzon.
- 06:00 UTC at 9.4°N 142.6°E ― The JTWC follows suit and upgrades Haima to a tropical storm.
- 12:00 UTC at 15.2°N 123.0°E ― Typhoon Sarika (Karen) continues to strengthen, becoming a Category 3 typhoon.
- 12:00 UTC (20:00 PHT) at 15.1°N 122.9°E ― The PAGASA assesses Typhoon Sarika (Karen) has reached its peak with 10-minute sustained winds of 150 kilometres per hour (81 kn; 93 mph).
- 12:00 UTC at 14.9°N 178.6°E ― A tropical depression enters the basin from the Central Pacific with a central pressure of 1010 hPa.
- 18:00 UTC at 15.8°N 121.8°E ― Typhoon Sarika (Karen) attained its peak intensity with 10-minute sustained winds of 95 knots (176 km/h; 109 mph) and a central pressure of 935 hPa as it about to makes landfall on Luzon, according to the JMA.
- 18:00 UTC at 15.8°N 121.7°E ― The JTWC assesses Typhoon Sarika (Karen) to have reached its peak intensity as a low-end Category 4 typhoon with 1-minute sustained winds of 115 knots (213 km/h; 132 mph).
- 18:00 UTC at 9.7°N 140.0°E ― Tropical Storm Haima strengthens further to a severe tropical storm.
- 18:00 UTC at 15.6°N 177.4°E ― The JMA last notes the tropical depression near the IDL as it weakens; the system dissipates six hours later.
- 18:30 UTC (02:30 PHT, October 16) at 15.75833°N 121.5625°E ― Typhoon Sarika (Karen) makes its first landfall on Baler, Aurora.

October 16

- 00:00 UTC at 16.4°N 120.0°E ― After emerging over the South China Sea, Typhoon Sarika (Karen) rapidly weakens to a Category 1 typhoon.
- 06:00 UTC at 10.4°N 139.1°E ― The JMA declares Haima had intensified to a typhoon.
- 06:00 UTC at 10.5°N 139.3°E ― The JTWC follows suit, upgrading Haima to a Category 1 typhoon.
- 06:00 UTC at 16.4°N 118.2°E ― The JTWC assesses Typhoon Sarika (Karen) slightly reintensified to a second peak with 1-minute sustained winds of 80 knots (150 km/h; 92 mph).
- 06:00 UTC at (14:00 PHT) at 16.5°N 118.3°E ― The PAGASA reports Typhoon Sarika (Karen) slightly re-intensified, achieving a second peak with 10-minute sustained winds of 130 kilometres per hour (70 kn; 81 mph).
- 18:00 UTC at 12.2°N 137.8°E ― Typhoon Haima further intensifies to a Category 2 typhoon.
- 18:00 UTC at (02:00 PHT, October 17) at 16.8°N 115.5°E ― The PAGASA reports Typhoon Sarika (Karen) has left the PAR.

October 17

- 00:00 UTC at 17.0°N 114.3°E ― Typhoon Sarika weakens to a severe tropical storm as it moves west-northwest over the South China Sea.
- 06:00 UTC at 13.3°N 135.5°E ― As it nears the boundary of the PAR, Typhoon Haima strengthens to a Category 3 typhoon.
- 09:30 UTC (17:30 PHT) at 13.7°N 134.9°E ― The PAGASA reports Typhoon Haima has entered PAR, gaining the name Lawin.
- 18:00 UTC 14.4°N 133.3°E ― Continuing on its heading towards Luzon, Haima (Lawin) intensifies to a Category 4 typhoon and is nearing super-typhoon streatngth, according to JTWC.
- 18:00 UTC at (02:00 PHT, October 18) at 14.4°N 133.3°E ― Typhoon Haima (Lawin) becomes a super-typhoon per the PAGASA tropical cyclone intensity scale.

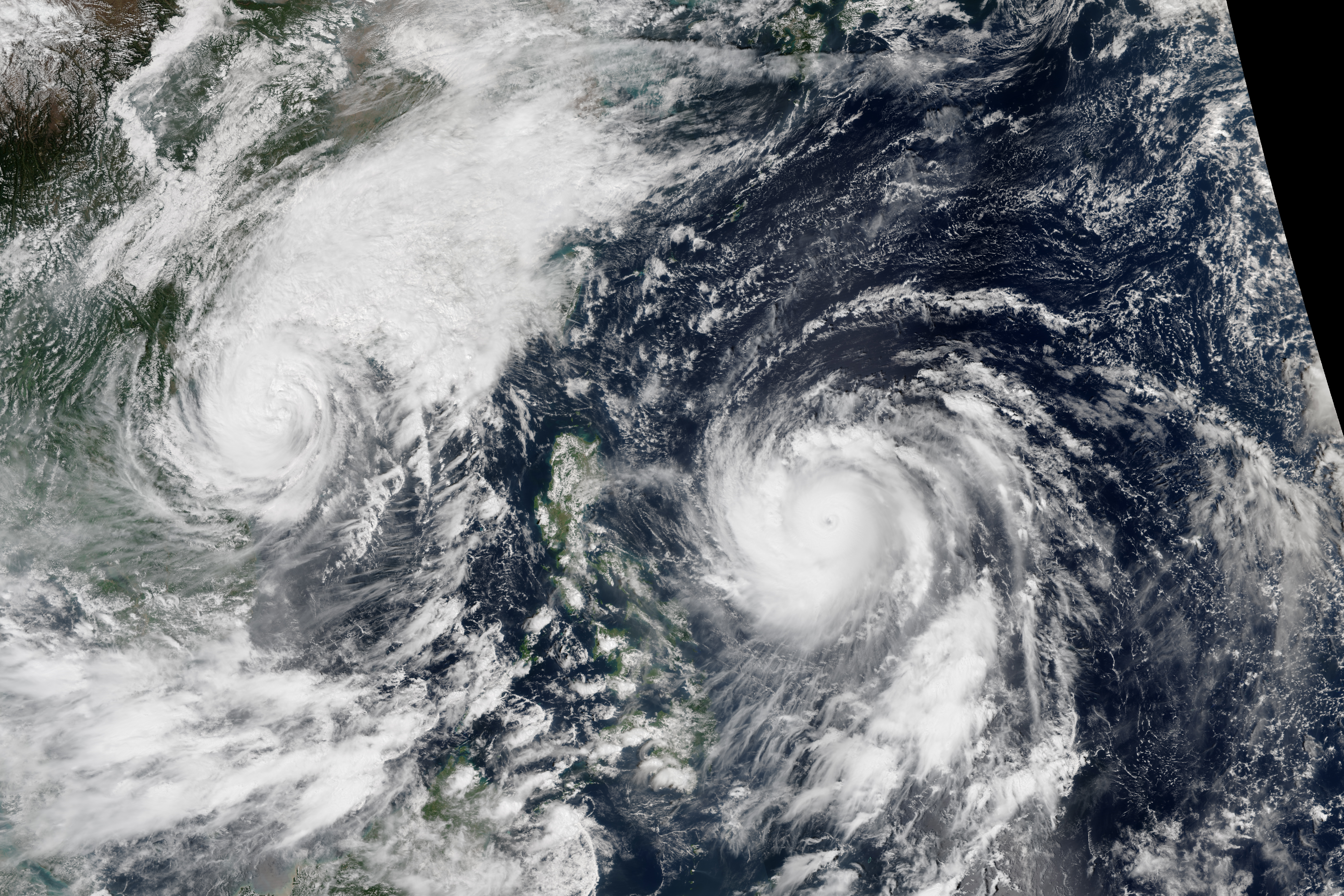
Two tropical cyclones active on October 18: Sarika (left) traversing Hainan and Haima (right) over the Philippine Sea.

October 18

- 00:00 UTC at 14.9°N 132.1°E ― The JTWC declares Haima (Lawin) had strengthened to a Category 4 super typhoon.
- 01:50 UTC (09:50 CST) at 18.906°N 110.481°E ― After slowly heading towards Hainan Island, Severe Tropical Storm Sarika finally makes its 2nd landfall on Hele, Wanning, Hainan.
- 12:00 UTC at 15.6°N 129.1°E ― Super Typhoon Haima (Lawin) further strengthens to a Category 5 super typhoon as it nears Luzon.
- 12:00 UTC at 19.7°N 109.3°E ― Sarika weakens to a tropical storm as it is about to emerge over Gulf of Tonkin.
- 12:00 UTC at 19.7°N 109.4°E ― The JTWC downgrades Sarika to a tropical storm after crossing Hainan Island.
- 18:00 UTC at 16.0°N 127.5°E ― As it continues to move west, Typhoon Haima (Lawin) reaches its peak intensity with 10-minute sustained winds of 115 knots (213 km/h; 132 mph) and a central pressure of 900 hPa.
- 18:00 UTC at 16.0°N 127.5°E ― The JTWC reports Super Typhoon Haima (Lawin) had reached its peak intensity with 1-minute sustained winds of 145 knots (269 km/h; 167 mph).

Haima making landfall on Luzon on October 19.

October 19

- 00:00 UTC at 20.9°N 108.5°E ― The JTWC last notes Sarika as it further weakens to a tropical depression approaching China.
- 03:00 UTC (11:00 PHT) at 16.2°N 125.7°E ― The PAGASA assesses Super Typhoon Haima (Lawin) to have reached its peak intensity with 10-minute sustained winds of 225 kilometres per hour (121 kn; 140 mph) as it moves closer to Luzon.
- 06:00 UTC at 16.7°N 124.7°E ― As it edges closer to Luzon, Super Typhoon Haima (Lawin) weakens to a Category 4 super-typhoon.
- 06:00 UTC at 21.7°N 108.1°E ― The JMA reports Sarika has weakened to a tropical depression as it was about to make its final landfall.
- 06:10 UTC (14:10 CST) at 21.6867°N 108.3547°E ― Tropical Depression Sarika makes its final landfall on Fangchenggang, Guangxi.
- 12:00 UTC at 17.3°N 123.2°E ― Haima (Lawin) weakens to a Category 4 typhoon as it nears landfall.
- 15:00 UTC (23:00 PHT) at 17.6°N 122.2°E ― The PAGASA reports Super Typhoon Haima (Lawin) has made landfall on Baguio Pt., Peñablanca, Cagayan.
- 18:00 UTC at 17.9°N 121.5°E ― Typhoon Haima (Lawin) weakens to a Category 3 typhoon as it moves across Luzon.
- 18:00 UTC at 22.4°N 108.0°E ― The JMA last notes Tropical Depression Sarika as it further weakens inland; the system dissipates six hours later.

October 20

- 00:00 UTC at 18.4°N 120.2°E ― Emerging over the South China Sea, the JTWC reports Haima (Lawin) weakened further to a Category 2 typhoon.
- 00:00 UTC (08:00 PHT) at 18.4°N 120.0°E ― The PAGASA downgrades Haima (Lawin) to a typhoon after succumbing to land interaction.
- 09:00 UTC (17:00 PHT) at 19.4°N 118.1°E ― The PAGASA reports Typhoon Haima (Lawin) has left the PAR.
- 12:00 UTC at 19.7°N 117.5°E ― Typhoon Haima weakened further to a Category 1 typhoon as it turns northwestward towards China.

October 21

- 00:00 UTC at 22.1°N 115.6°E ― As it moves closer to the Chinese coast, the JMA downgrades Haima to a severe tropical storm.
- 04:40 UTC (12:40 CST) at 22.9674°N 115.3229°E ― Haima makes landfall on Haifeng County, Shanwei, Guangdong.
- 06:00 UTC at 23.2°N 115.1°E ― After making landfall on Southern China, Haima weakens further to a tropical storm, according to the JMA.
- 06:00 UTC at 23.5°N 115.1°E ― The JTWC follows suit and downgrades Haima to a tropical storm.
- 18:00 UTC at 25.9°N 115.5°E ― The JMA assesses Haima has weakened to a tropical depression overland.
- 18:00 UTC at 26.1°N 115.5°E ― The JTWC last notes Haima as it further weakens while turning to the north-east.

October 22

- 00:00 UTC at 27.4°N 116.4°E ― The JMA reports Haima has turned extratropical as it embeds itself to a stationary front.

October 26

- 06:00 UTC at 27.8°N 145.4°E ― The JMA last notes the extratropical remnants of Haima as it meanders around the sea east of the Ogasawara Islands; the system dissipates six hours later.

October 30

- 00:00 UTC at 10.1°N 146.9°E ― The JMA declares the formation of a tropical depression southeast of Guam.

October 31

- 00:00 UTC ― A tropical depression develops east-southeast of Mindanao.
- 06:00 UTC ― The tropical depression east-southeast of Mindanao attains a minimal central pressure of 1004 hPa.
- 12:00 UTC ― The tropical depression east-southeast of Mindanao weakens back into a low-pressure area.

=== November ===
November 1

- 00:00 UTC at 13.0°N 151.5°E ― A tropical depression develops about 704 km (437 mi) east of Andersen Air Force Base, Guam.
- 06:00 UTC at 13.7°N 150.5°E ― The tropical depression east of Guam attains a minimal pressure of 1002 hPa.
- 18:00 UTC at 15.3°N 148.5°E ― As it traverses northwestward, the tropical depression east of Guam attains 10-minute sustained winds of 30 knots (56 km/h; 35 mph) and a lower central pressure of 1000 hPa.

November 2

- 06:00 UTC at 12.8°N 138.4°E ― The JTWC designates the tropical depression near Guam as 26W after it passed south of the island.
- 06:00 UTC at 16.5°N 146.1°E ― The tropical depression, now moving to the north of Guam, re-attains a central pressure of 1000 hPa as it interacts with a nearby tropical system to its southwest.
- 18:00 UTC at 7.3°N 114.5°E ― The JMA starts to monitor a tropical depression that have formed off the coast of Malaysia with a central pressure of 1004 hPa.

November 3

- 00:00 UTC at 13.3°N 137.3°E ― The JMA names Tropical Depression 26W as Tropical Storm Meari.
- 00:00 UTC at 7.2°N 114.5°E ― The tropical depression near Malaysia attains 10-minute sustained winds of 30 knots (56 km/h; 35 mph) as it slowly moves over the South China Sea.
- 12:00 UTC at 13.8°N 138.4°E ― The JTWC follows suit and upgrades Meari to a tropical storm as it curves to the northeast.

November 4

- 06:00 UTC at 15.6°N 139.1°E ― Tropical Storm Meari intensifies to a severe tropical storm.
- 06:00 UTC at 9.3°N 110.6°E ― The tropical depression over the South China Sea re-attains a central pressure of 1004 hPa as it moves closer to Vietnam.
- 18:00 UTC at 16.8°N 139.9°E ― The JTWC upgrades Tropical Storm Meari to a Category 1-equivalent typhoon as it moves to the northeast.
- 18:00 UTC at 17.4°N 143.9°E ― The JMA reports the tropical depression, after it had turned to the northeast, speeding away from Guam, attains its lowest central pressure of 998 hPa.

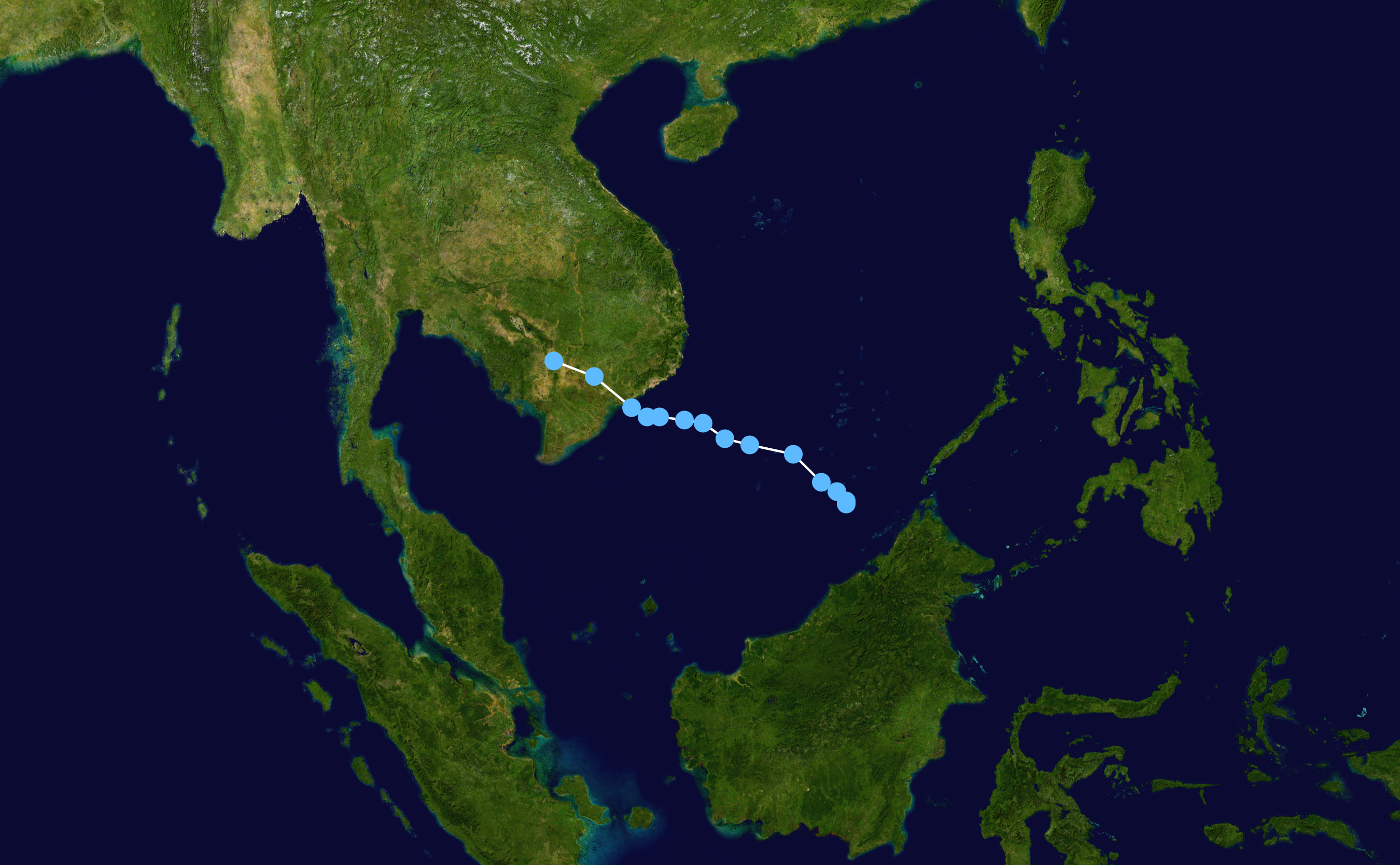
Track of the tropical depression that caused heavy flodding in Vietnam during early November.

November 5

- 00:00 UTC at 17.2°N 139.9°E ― The JMA follows suit and upgrades Meari to a typhoon.
- 06:00 UTC at 10.0°N 108.1°E ― The tropical depression off the coast of Vietnam re-attains for the final time its central pressure of 1004 hPa.
- 12:00 UTC (19:00 ICT) at 10.3°N 107.6°E ― The tropical depression makes landfall on Bình Thuận – Bà Rịa–Vũng Tàu provinces of Vietnam, causing massive flooding around the area.
- 12:00 UTC at 18.3°N 140.7°E ― The JMA assesses Typhoon Meari to have reached its peak with 10-minute sustained winds of 75 knots (139 km/h; 86 mph) and a central pressure of 960 hPa as it starts to accelerate to the northeast.
- 18:00 UTC at 18.7°N 141.8°E ― Typhoon Meari intensifies further to a Category 2 typhoon, according to the JTWC.
- 18:00 UTC at 28.3°N 158.4°E ― The tropical depression to the east-northeast of Guam becomes extratropical.

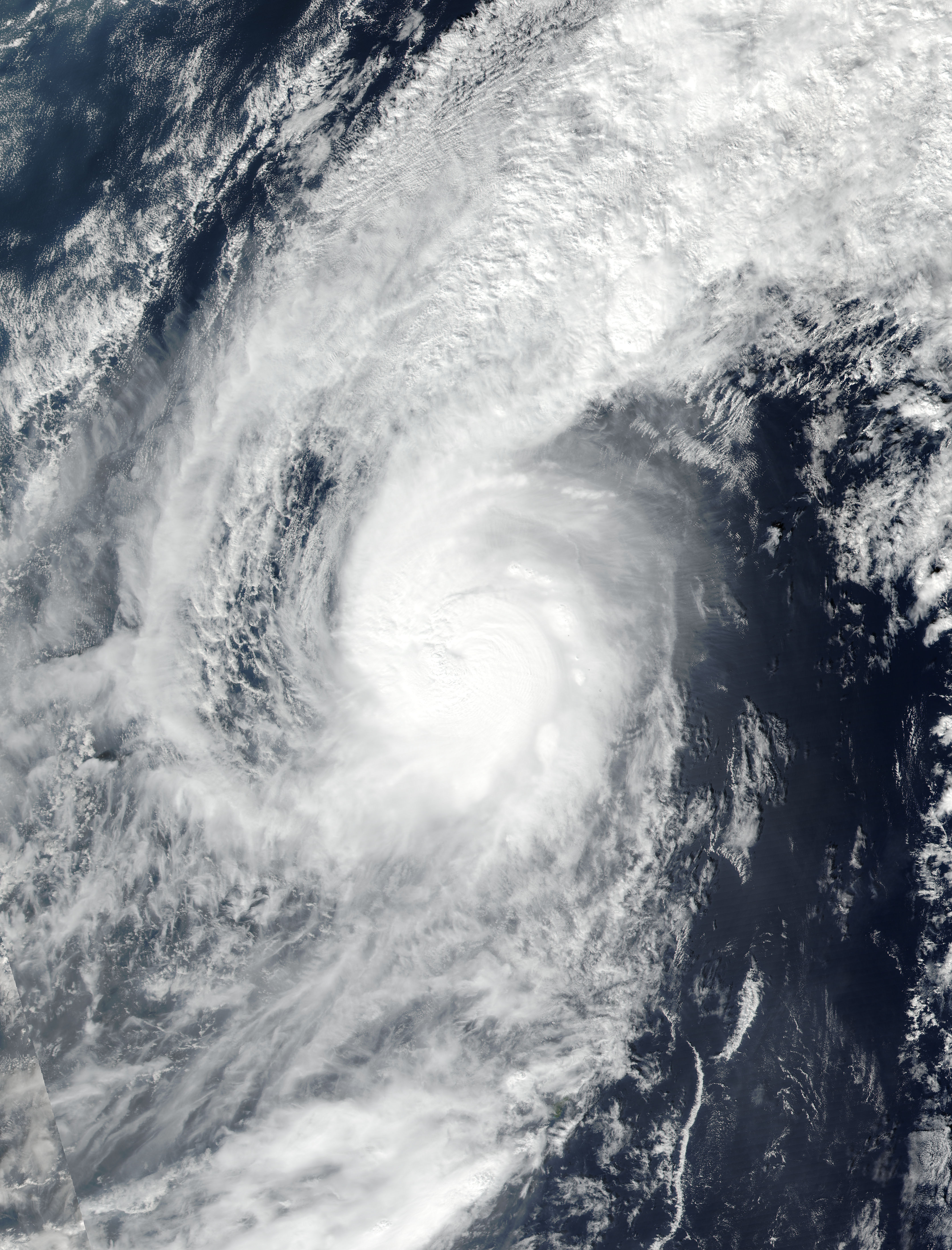
Meari after its peak intensity on November 6.

November 6

- 00:00 UTC at 19.5°N 142.7°E ― The JTWC assesses Typhoon Meari to have peaked with 1-minute sustained winds of 90 knots (170 km/h; 100 mph).
- 00:00 UTC at 11.8°N 105.1°E ― The JMA stops tracking on the tropical depression inland Vietnam; the system dissipates six hours later.
- 12:00 UTC at 22.3°N 144.9°E ― Typhoon Meari weakens to a Category 1 typhoon as it passes north of the Northern Mariana Islands.

November 7

- 00:00 UTC at 27.0°N 147.0°E ― The JTWC assesses Meari to have turned extratropical as it attaches to a front.
- 06:00 UTC at 28.3°N 147.5°E ― The JMA declares Typhoon Meari has turned extratropical as it turns to the east-northeast.
- 18:00 UTC at 41.0°N 178.5°W ― The JMA last notes the extratropical remnants of a tropical depression formerly originating to the east of Guam as it exits the basin.

November 8

- 18:00 UTC at 12.8°N 161.4°E ― A tropical depression forms around the Marshall Islands.

November 9

- 06:00 UTC at 14.3°N 159.6°E ― The JTWC designates the tropical depression around the Marshall Islands as 27W as it moves northwestward.
- 12:00 UTC at 15.5°N 158.4°E ― The JTWC upgrades 27W into a tropical storm with 1-minute sutained winds of 35 knots (65 km/h; 40 mph).
- 12:00 UTC at10.6°N 172.6°E ― The JMA declares the formation of a tropical depression about 455 km (285 mi) to the east-northeast of Kwajalein Atoll.
- 18:00 UTC at 16.3°N 157.7°E ― The JMA reports 27W have attained its lowest central pressure of 1002 hPa.
- 18:00 UTC at 10.6°N 171.0°E ― The tropical depression to the east-northeast of Kwajalein Atoll attains a central pressure of 1008 hPa.
- 18:00 UTC at 39.0°N 165.5°E ― The JMA last notes the extratropical remnants of Meari as the system got absorbed by another extratropical system.

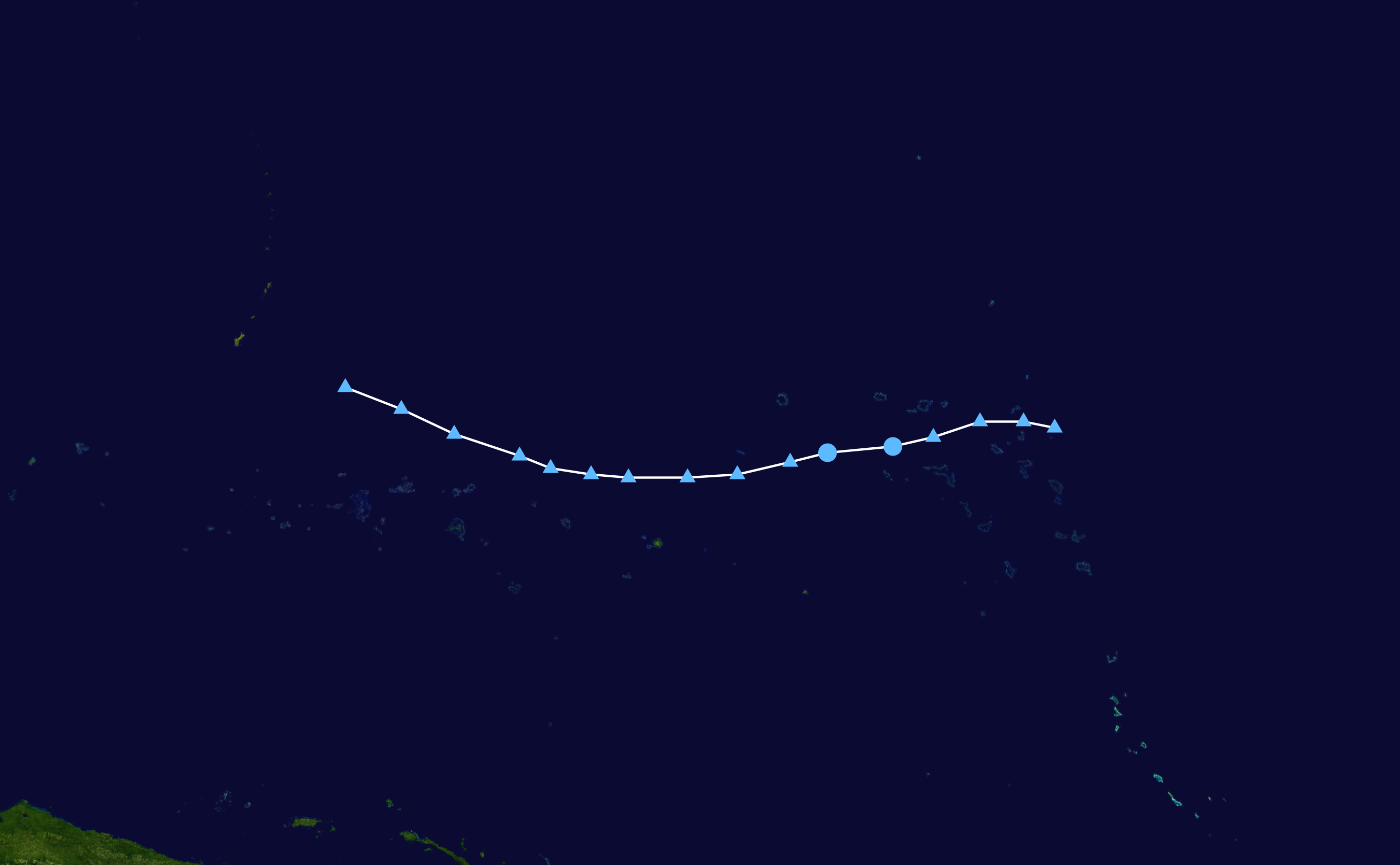
Track of 28W during early-mid November.

November 10

- 00:00 UTC at 16.9°N 156.9°E ― Tropical Depression 27W intensifies into Tropical Storm Ma-on and attains 10-minute sustained winds of 35 knots (65 km/h; 40 mph).
- 06:00 UTC at 17.2°N 155.4°E ― The JTWC downgrades Ma-on to a tropical depression.
- 18:00 UTC at 10.0°N 165.8°E ― The JTWC designates the tropical depression to the northeast of Kwajalein Atoll as 28W with 1-minute sustained winds of 25 knots (46 km/h; 29 mph).
- 18:00 UTC at 10.0°N 165.8°E ― Tropical Depression 28W re-attains a central pressure of 1008 hPa.
- 18:00 UTC at 18.0°N 153.0°E ― The JTWC stops tracking on Tropical Depression Ma-on as it traverses northwestward.

November 11

- 00:00 UTC at 9.8°N 163.7°E ― The JTWC stops tracking on 28W as it weakens and moves west-southwestward.

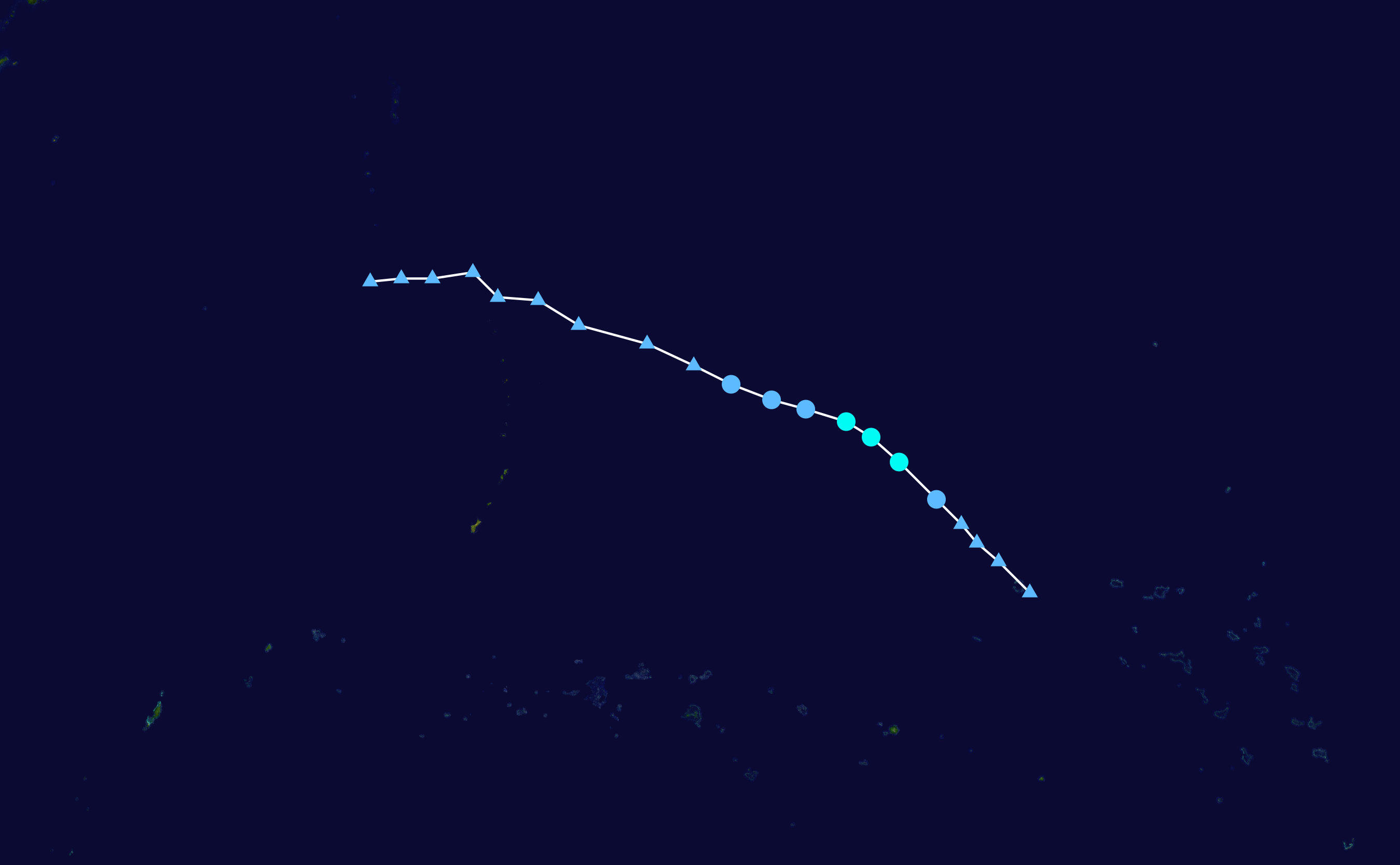
Track of Ma-on during early-mid November.

November 12

- 00:00 UTC at 20.8°N 145.5°E ― Tropical Storm Ma-on weakens to a tropical depression as it passes north of the Northern Mariana Islands.
- 00:00 UTC at 9.0°N 157.3°E ― The JMA last notes 28W and dissipates six hours later.

November 13

- 00:00 UTC at 21.3°N 141.4°E ― The JMA stops tracking on Ma-on as it further weakens; the system dissipates six hours later around the Ogasawara Islands.

November 23

- 06:00 UTC (14:00 PHT) at 8.9°N 130.5°E ― The PAGASA reports the formation of Tropical Depression Marce east of Mindanao.

November 24

- 00:00 UTC at 9.7°N 126.8°E ― The JMA starts to track on Tropical Depression Marce to the northeast of Mindanao.
- 00:00 UTC at 9.5°N 127.8°E ― The JTWC designates Tropical Depression Marce as 29W.
- 09:00 UTC (17:00 PHT) at 9.905°N 126.066667°E ― Tropical Depression 29W (Marce) makes its first landfall on Siargao Island, Surigao Del Norte.
- 12:00 UTC at 10.5°N 125.3°E ― The JTWC reports 29W (Marce) has intensified to a tropical storm as it traverses Leyte Gulf.
- 12:30 UTC (20:30 PHT) at 10.745797°N 125.012181°E ― Tropical Depression 29W (Marce) makes its second landfall on Abuyog, Leyte.
- 17:30 UTC (01:30 PHT, November 25) at 11.25°N 124°E ― Tropical Depression 29W (Marce) makes its third landfall on Daanbantayan, Cebu.
- 18:00 UTC (02:00 PHT, November 25) at 11.2°N 123.8°E ― The PAGASA reports Tropical Depression 29W (Marce) has intensified into a tropical storm while traversing over the Visayan Sea.
- 21:00 UTC (05:00 PHT, November 25) at 11.57°N 123.13°E ― Tropical Depression 29W (Marce) makes its fourth landfall on Carles, Iloilo.

November 25

- 10:00 UTC (17:00 PHT) at 11.9°N 120.233333°E ― Tropical Depression 29W (Marce) makes its fifth and final landfall on Calamian Islands, Palawan.
- 12:00 UTC at 11.7°N 120.7°E ― Emerging over the sea south of Mindoro, Tropical Depression 29W (Marce) intensifies to Tropical Storm Tokage.

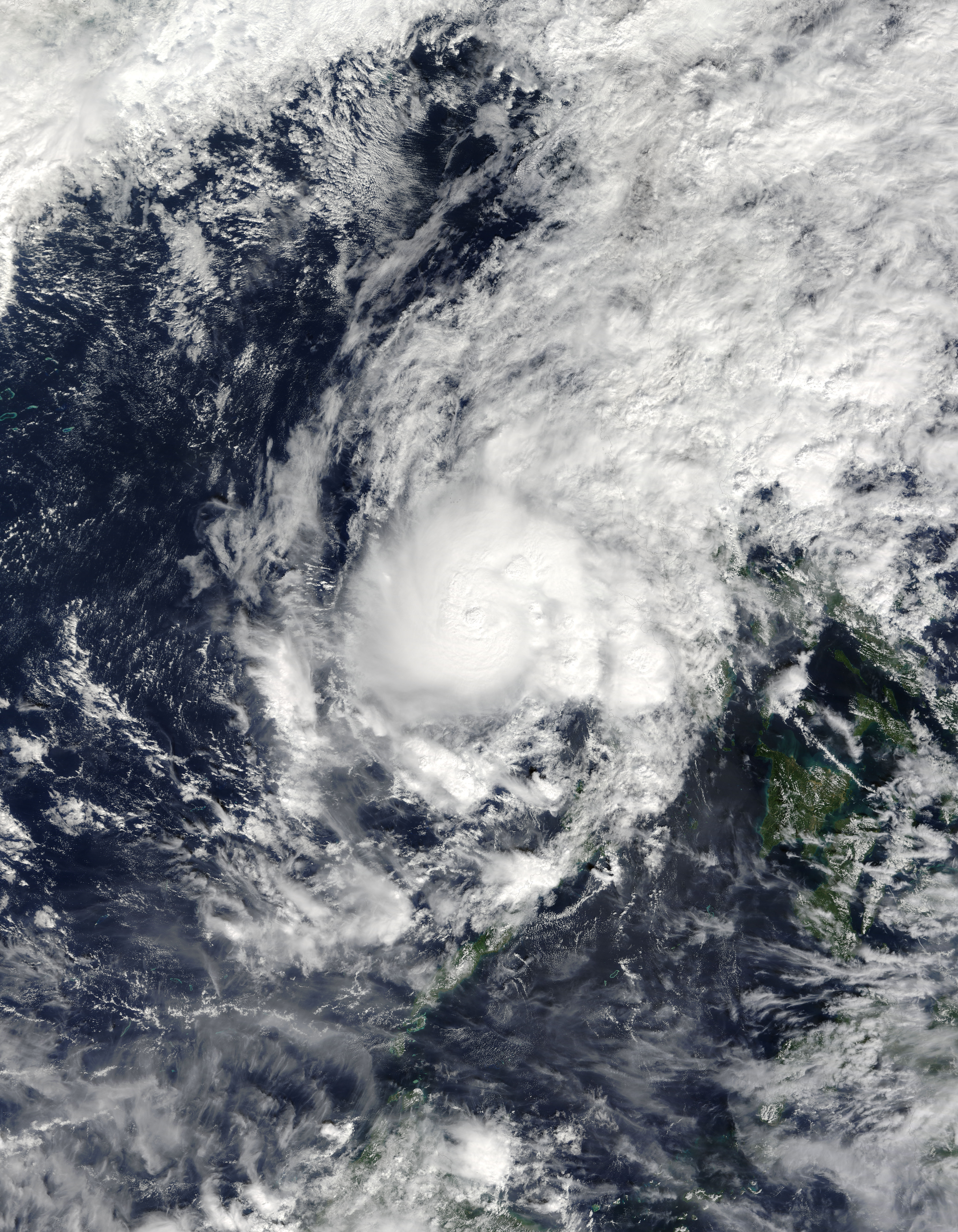
Tokage after its peak intensity on November 26.

November 26

- 00:00 UTC at 13.2°N 118.7°E ― Tropical Storm Tokage (Marce) strengthens to severe tropical storm status and achieves peak intensity from the JMA with 10-minute sustained winds of 50 knots (93 km/h; 58 mph) and attains a minimum central pressure of 992 hPa.
- 00:00 UTC at 13.3°N 118.7°E ― Tokage (Marce) strengthens to a Category 1 typhoon with an initial peak intensity of 1-minute sustained winds of 75 knots (139 km/h; 86 mph).
- 06:00 UTC at 13.8°N 117.7°E ― Severe Tropical Storm Tokage (Marce) weakens back to a tropical storm over the South China Sea.
- 12:00 UTC at 14.4°N 117.5°E ― The JTWC downgrades Tokage (Marce) back to a high-end tropical storm as it starts to curve north.
- 18:00 UTC at 15.0°N 117.4°E ― The JTWC upgrades Tokage (Marce) back to a Category 1 typhoon as it starts to move north-northeastwards.
- 18:00 UTC at (02:00 PHT, November 27) at 15.0°N 116.8°E ― The PAGASA reports Tokage (Marce) has reached its peak intensity with 10-minute sustained winds of 85 kilometres per hour (46 kn; 53 mph).

November 27

- 06:00 UTC at 16.6°N 118.1°E ― The JTWC reports Tokage (Marce) reaches a secondary peak with higher 1-minute sutained winds of 80 knots (150 km/h; 92 mph) west of Luzon.
- 12:00 UTC at 17.1°N 118.4°E ― Typhoon Tokage (Marce) weakens back to a tropical storm for the final time according to the JTWC.
- 18:00 UTC at 17.5°N 118.5°E ― The JTWC declares Tokage (Marce) has weakened to a tropical depression.

November 28

- 00:00 UTC at 17.1°N 118.7°E ― The JTWC stops tracking on Tropical Depression Tokage (Marce) as it performs a tight loop.
- 00:00 UTC at 17.1°N 118.7°E ― The JMA last notes Tokage (Marce) as it weakens to a tropical depression and dissipates six hours later.
- 00:00 UTC at (08:00 PHT) at 17.3°N 118.7°E ― The PAGASA reports Tokage (Marce) has weakened to a tropical depression as it starts to move to the west.
- 12:00 UTC (20:00 PHT) at 16.0°N 116.2°E ― The PAGASA reports Tropical Depression Tokage (Marce) has weakened further to a low-pressure area as it moves westwards over the South China Sea.

=== December ===
December 10

- 06:00 UTC at 7.6°N 110.4°E ― A tropical depression forms to the southeast of Ho Chi Minh City in Southern Vietnam. The JMA assesses the system as having a central pressure of 1004 hPa.
- 18:00 UTC at 9.0°N 110.0°E ― The JMA issues warnings on the tropical depression southeast of Vietnam as it attains 10-minute sustained winds of 30 knots (56 km/h; 35 mph) and re-attains its minimum central pressure of 1004 hPa.

December 13

- 00:00 UTC (07:00 ICT) at 11.4°N 108.6°E ― After days of meandering over the South China Sea, the tropical depression finally makes landfall on Southern Vietnam.

December 14

- 00:00 UTC at 11.7°N 108.0°E ― The tropical depression inland Vietnam weakens to a low-pressure area.

December 20

- 12:00 UTC at 6.2°N 144.5°E ― A tropical depression forms near the Caroline Islands.
- 18:00 UTC at 6.2°N 143.6°E ― The JTWC designates the tropical depression near the Caroline Islands as 30W.

December 21

- 12:00 UTC at 7.1°N 141.1°E ― The JTWC upgrades 30W to a tropical storm as it moves northwestward.
- 18:00 UTC at 7.8°N 140.0°E ― The JMA upgrades Tropical Depression 30W into Tropical Storm Nock-ten.

December 22

- 18:00 UTC at 11.1°N 134.8°E ― Tropical Storm Nock-ten intensifies further into a severe tropical storm.
- 19:00 UTC (32:00 PHT, December 23) ― The PAGASA reports Severe Tropical Storm Nock-ten has entered PAR and was named Nina.

December 23

- 06:00 UTC at 11.9°N 132.1°E ― Nock-ten (Nina) becomes a typhoon as it continues its west-northwestward movement.
- 06:00 UTC at 12.2°N 132.2°E ― Tropical Storm Nock-ten (Nina) becomes a Category 1 typhoon.
- 18:00 UTC at 13.0°N 129.9°E ― Typhoon Nock-ten (Nina) starts its rapid intensification and becomes a Category 2 typhoon.
- 18:00 UTC at (02:00 PHT, December 24) at 13.0°N 129.9°E ― The PAGASA reports Nock-ten (Nina) has intensified to a typhoon.

December 24

- 00:00 UTC at 13.1°N 128.9°E ― Typhoon Nock-ten (Nina) continues to intensify and becomes a Category 3 typhoon.
- 06:00 UTC at 13.3°N 128.2°E ― Typhoon Nock-ten (Nina) reaches its peak intensity with 10-minute sustained winds of 105 knots (194 km/h; 121 mph) and a minimum central pressure of 915 hPa.
- 06:00 UTC at 13.3°N 128.2°E ― Typhoon Nock-ten (Nina) intensifies further to a Category 4 typhoon as it continues to march westwards.
- 18:00 UTC at 13.6°N 126.7°E ― The JTWC upgrades Nock-ten (Nina) to a super typhoon as it continues to intensify.

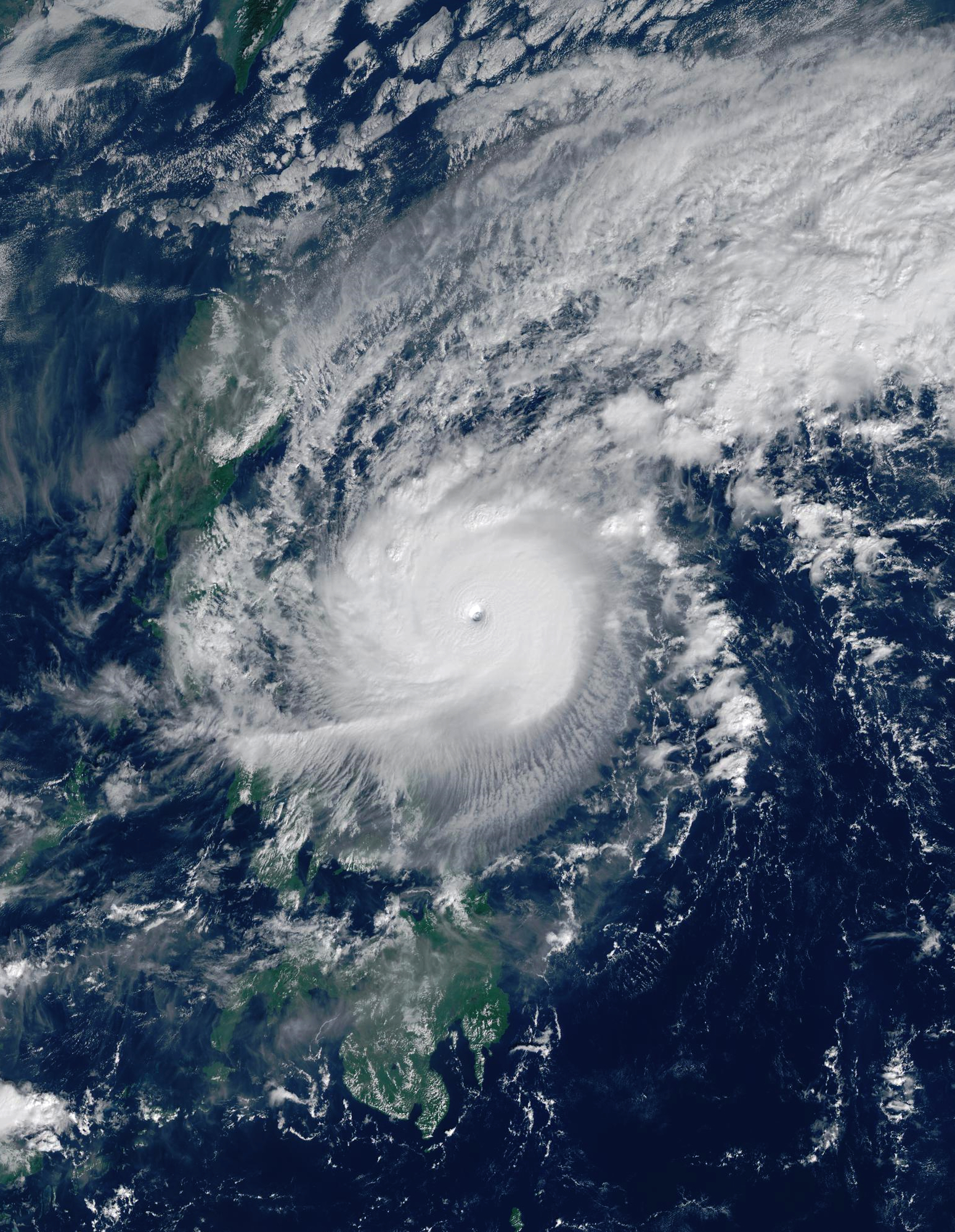
Nock-ten shortly after its peak on December 25.

December 25

- 00:00 UTC at 13.5°N 125.9°E ― The JTWC reports Typhoon Nock-ten (Nina) has attained its peak intensity as a Category 5 super-typhoon with 1-minute sustained winds of 140 knots (260 km/h; 160 mph).
- 10:00 UTC at (08:00 PHT) at 13.5°N 126.0°E ― The PAGASA reports Typhoon Nock-ten (Nina) has reached super-typhoon strength with 10-minute sustained winds of 185 kilometres per hour (100 kn; 115 mph).
- 06:00 UTC at 13.5°N 125.0°E ― Typhoon Nock-ten (Nina) weakens to a Category 4 super-typhoon as it nears landfall.
- 10:30 UTC (18:30 PHT) at 13.6°N 124.3°E ― Typhoon Nock-ten (Nina) makes its first landfall on Bato, Catanduanes.
- 12:00 UTC at 13.5°N 124.0°E ― Typhoon Nock-ten (Nina) weakens below super typhoon status over Ragay Gulf, according to the JTWC.
- 12:00 UTC at (20:00 PHT) at 13.5°N 124.0°E ― The PAGASA downgrades Nock-ten (Nina) to typhoon status as it is about to make landfall on mainland Luzon.
- 13:30 UTC (21:30 PHT) at 13.6039°N 123.5233°E ― Typhoon Nock-ten (Nina) makes its second landfall on Sagñay, Camarines Sur.
- 18:00 UTC (02:00 PHT, December 26) at 13.3231°N 122.6761°E ― Typhoon Nock-ten (Nina) makes its third landfall on San Andres, Quezon.
- 18:00 UTC at 13.3°N 122.7°E ― The JTWC downgrades Nock-ten (Nina) further to a Category 3 typhoon as it makes landfall on the Bondoc Peninsula.
- 20:30 UTC (04:30 PHT, December 26) at 13.32°N 122.08°E ― After emerging over Mongpong Pass, Typhoon Nock-ten (Nina) makes its fourth landfall on Torrijos, Marinduque.

December 26

- 00:00 UTC at 13.3°N 121.3°E ― Typhoon Nock-ten (Nina) weakens to a Category 2 typhoon as it traverses the northern part of Mindoro.
- 01:15 UTC (09:15 PHT) at 13.549722°N 121.070833°E ― Typhoon Nock-ten (Nina) makes its fifth landfall on Verde Island, Batangas City, Batangas.
- 02:10 UTC (10:10 PHT) at 13.65°N 120.87°E ― Continuing to weaken due to land interaction, Typhoon Nock-ten (Nina) makes its sixth landfall on Tingloy, Batangas.
- 03:40 UTC (11:40 PHT) at 13.83224°N 120.63219°E ― Briefly traversing Balayan Bay, Typhoon Nock-ten (Nina) makes its seventh landfall on Calatagan, Batangas.
- 05:00 UTC (13:00 PHT) at 13.7675°N 120.186111°E ― Typhoon Nock-ten (Nina) makes its eighth and final landfall on Lubang Island, Occidental Mindoro.
- 06:00 UTC at 14.0°N 119.9°E ― Typhoon Nock-ten (Nina) weakens further to a Category 1 typhoon as it turns northwest.

December 27

- 00:00 UTC at 15.0°N 116.3°E ― Typhoon Nock-ten (Nina) weakens to a severe tropical storm as it turns to the southwest.
  - At 14.9°N 116.6°E ― The JTWC downgrades Nock-ten (Nina) to a tropical storm.
- 00:00 UTC (08:00 PHT) at 15.0°N 116.3°E ― The PAGASA follows suit and downgrades Nock-ten (Nina) to a severe tropical storm.
- 06:00 UTC at 5.6°N 152.7°E ― A tropical depression forms near Chuuk. The JMA assesses the system as having a central pressure of 1004 hPa.
- 12:00 UTC at 14.2°N 115.5°E ― The JMA further downgrades Nock-ten (Nina) to a tropical storm.
- 12:00 UTC (20:00 PHT) at 14.2°N 115.5°E ― The PAGASA reports Nock-ten (Nina) has weakened to a tropical storm.
- 15:40 UTC (23:40 PHT) at 13.9°N 115.1°E ― The PAGASA reports Nock-ten (Nina) has left the PAR.
- 18:00 UTC at 5.4°N 151.6°E ― The tropical depression near Chuuk weakens to a low-pressure area as it moves westward.
- 18:00 UTC at 13.3°N 114.7°E ― Nock-ten weakens further to a tropical depression as it moves southwestward over the South China Sea.
- 18:00 UTC at 13.6°N 114.6°E ― The JTWC follows suit and downgrades Nock-ten to a tropical depression.

December 28

- 00:00 UTC at 12.9°N 113.3°E ― The JTWC stops tracking on Tropical Depression Nock-ten as it further weakens.
- 12:00 UTC at 11.2°N 111.4°E ― The JMA last notes Tropical Depression Nock-ten as the system further weakens and dissipates six hours later, becoming an area of low pressure.

December 31

- 23:59 UTC — The 2016 Pacific typhoon season ends.

== See also ==
- Timeline of the 2016 Pacific hurricane season
- Timeline of the 2016 Atlantic hurricane season
