= Tropical cyclones in 2016 =

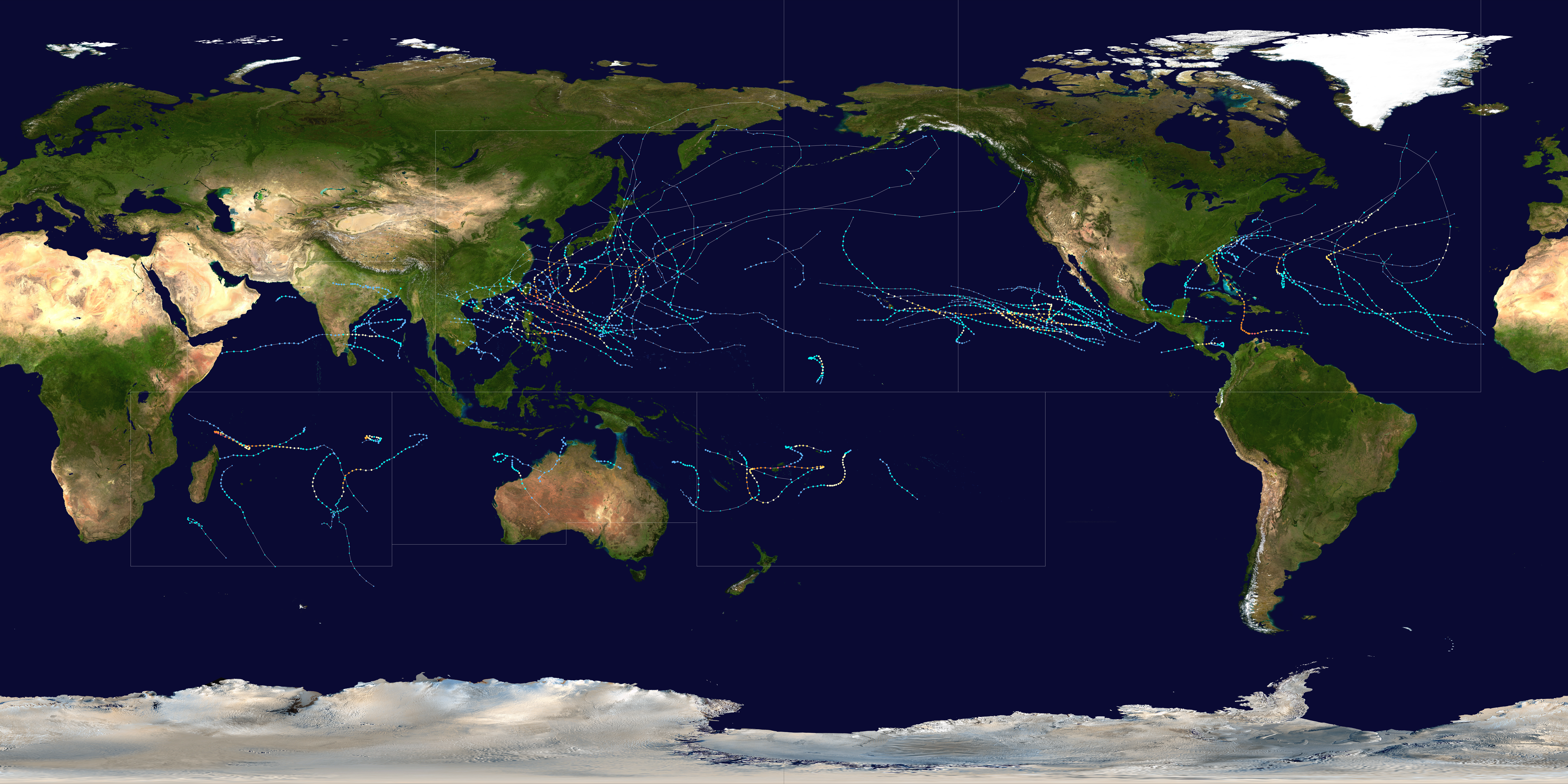
- Year summary map

Year boundaries
- First system: #01-2016
- Formed: January 5, 2016
- Last system: Nock-ten
- Dissipated: December 28, 2016

Strongest system
- Name: Winston (Note: The "strength" of a tropical cyclone is measured by the minimum barometric pressure, not wind speed. Most meteorological organizations rate the intensity of a storm by this figure, so the lower the minimum pressure of the storm, the more intense or "stronger" it is considered to be. The strongest winds were actually from Meranti, at 195 mph (315 km/h).)
- Lowest pressure: 884 mbar (hPa); 26.10 inHg

Longest lasting system
- Name: Winston
- Duration: 24 days

Year statistics
- Total systems: 135
- Named systems: 83
- Total fatalities: 2,063 total
- Total damage: $41.45 billion (2016 USD)
Related articles
- 2016 Atlantic hurricane season
- 2016 Pacific hurricane season
- 2016 Pacific typhoon season
- 2016 North Indian Ocean cyclone season
- 2015–16 South-West Indian Ocean cyclone season
- 2016–17 South-West Indian Ocean cyclone season
- 2015–16 Australian region cyclone season
- 2016–17 Australian region cyclone season
- 2015–16 South Pacific cyclone season
- 2016–17 South Pacific cyclone season

During 2016, tropical cyclones formed within seven different tropical cyclone basins, located within various parts of the Atlantic, Pacific and Indian Oceans. During the year, 135 tropical cyclones formed in bodies of water known as tropical cyclone basins. Of these, 83, including two subtropical cyclones in the South Atlantic Ocean and two tropical-like cyclones in the Mediterranean, were named by various weather agencies when they attained maximum sustained winds of 35 knots (65 km/h; 40 mph). The strongest storm of the year was Winston, peaking with a pressure of 884 hPa (26.10 inHg) and with 10-minute sustained winds of 280 km/h (175 mph) before striking Fiji. The costliest and deadliest tropical cyclone in 2016 was Hurricane Matthew, which impacted Haiti, Cuba, Florida, Georgia and the Carolinas, causing $16.5 billion in damage. Matthew killed 603 people; 546 in Haiti, 47 in United States, 4 in Cuba and Dominican Republic, and 1 in Colombia and St. Vincent. Throughout the year, a twenty-four Category 3 tropical cyclones formed, including twenty-one tropical cyclones of Category 4 and 5, while there were eight Category 5 tropical cyclones. The accumulated cyclone energy (ACE) index for the 2016 (seven basins combined), as calculated by Colorado State University (CSU) was 806.5 units.

2016 had a slightly above average amount of tropical cyclones forming in the year. The most active basin of the year was the Western Pacific documenting a record 26 named storms. The Eastern Pacific also had an above-average season with 21 named storms forming. The North Atlantic similarly was the first above-average since 2012 with 15 named storms and 7 hurricanes forming. The above activity can be blamed on a La Niña pattern which formed during the summer of the year. In the North Indian Ocean was a relatively below-average season which featured four named storms. The Southern Hemisphere had relatively average activity throughout much of the year– with the exception of the Australian region which remained below average because of positive IOD– the other South-West Indian Ocean and South Pacific basins featured above-average seasons.

Tropical cyclones are primarily monitored by a group of ten warning centers, which have been designated as a Regional Specialized Meteorological Centre (RSMC) or a Tropical Cyclone Warning Center (TCWC) by the World Meteorological Organization. These are the United States National Hurricane Center (NHC) and Central Pacific Hurricane Center, the Japan Meteorological Agency (JMA), the Indian Meteorological Department (IMD), Météo-France (MFR), Indonesia's Badan Meteorologi, Klimatologi, dan Geofisika, the Australian Bureau of Meteorology (BOM), Papua New Guinea's National Weather Service, the Fiji Meteorological Service (FMS) as well as New Zealand's MetService. Other notable warning centers include the Philippine Atmospheric, Geophysical, and Astronomical Services Administration (PAGASA), the United States Joint Typhoon Warning Center (JTWC), and the Brazilian Navy Hydrographic Center(BNHC).

Taken by various of satellites throughout 2016, these are the 24 tropical cyclones that reached at least Category 3 on the Saffir-Simpson scale during that year, from Winston in February to Nock-ten in December. Among them, Winston (first image in the first row) is the strongest with a minimal barometric pressure of 884 hPa.

== Global atmospheric and hydrological conditions ==
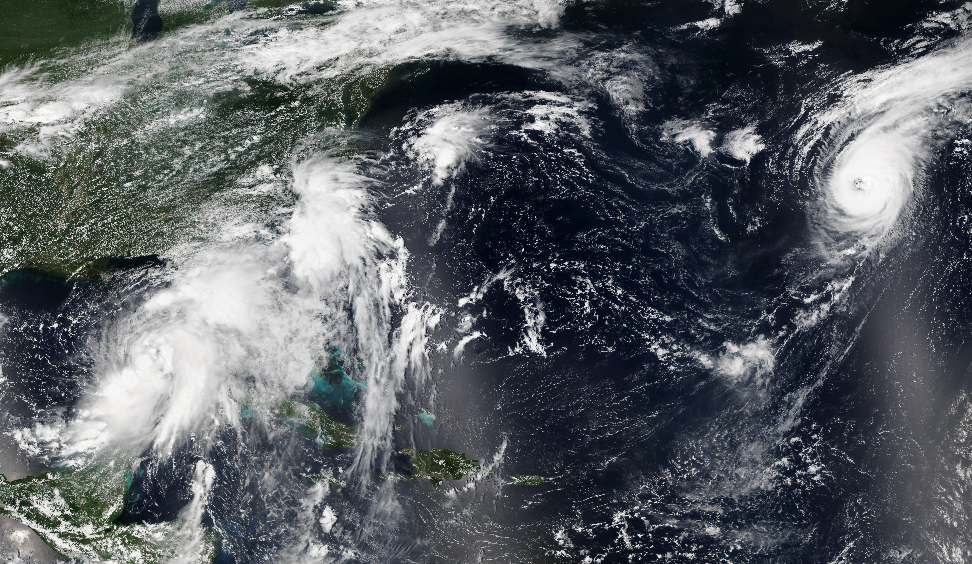
Three tropical cyclones active in the Atlantic basin on August 31. From left to right: Hermine (left), TD Eight (northeast of Hermine, middle), and Gaston (right)

During November and December 2015, values within NOAA's Oceanic Niño Index peaked at 2.4 °C (4.3 °F), which surpassed December 1997 value of 2.2 °C (4.0 °F). NOAA subsequently reported that the 3-month average from November 2015 to January 2016 of the ONI had peaked at 2.3 °C (4.1 °F), which meant that the 2014–16 event was tied with the 1997–98 event for the strongest values on record. However, overall the event was considered to be one of the three strongest El Nino events since 1950, since there was a number of different ways to measure the strength of an event. The event subsequently started to weaken with sea surface temperature anomalies across the equatorial pacific decreasing, while predictions about a possible La Niña event taking place during 2016 started to be made.

During May 2016, the El Niño event dissipated as near to below average sea surface temperatures, expanded across the eastern equatorial Pacific Ocean. Atmospheric anomalies over the tropical Pacific Ocean had also weakened and become consistent with ENSO neutral conditions. These anomalies included the traditional and equatorial Southern Oscillation indices becoming near zero, while atmospheric convection, upper and lower level winds all became near average. As a result of this the BoM, NOAA's CPC, IRI, and the JMA, all declared that the record-tying El Niño event had ended in late May/early June.

== Summary ==
=== North Atlantic Ocean ===
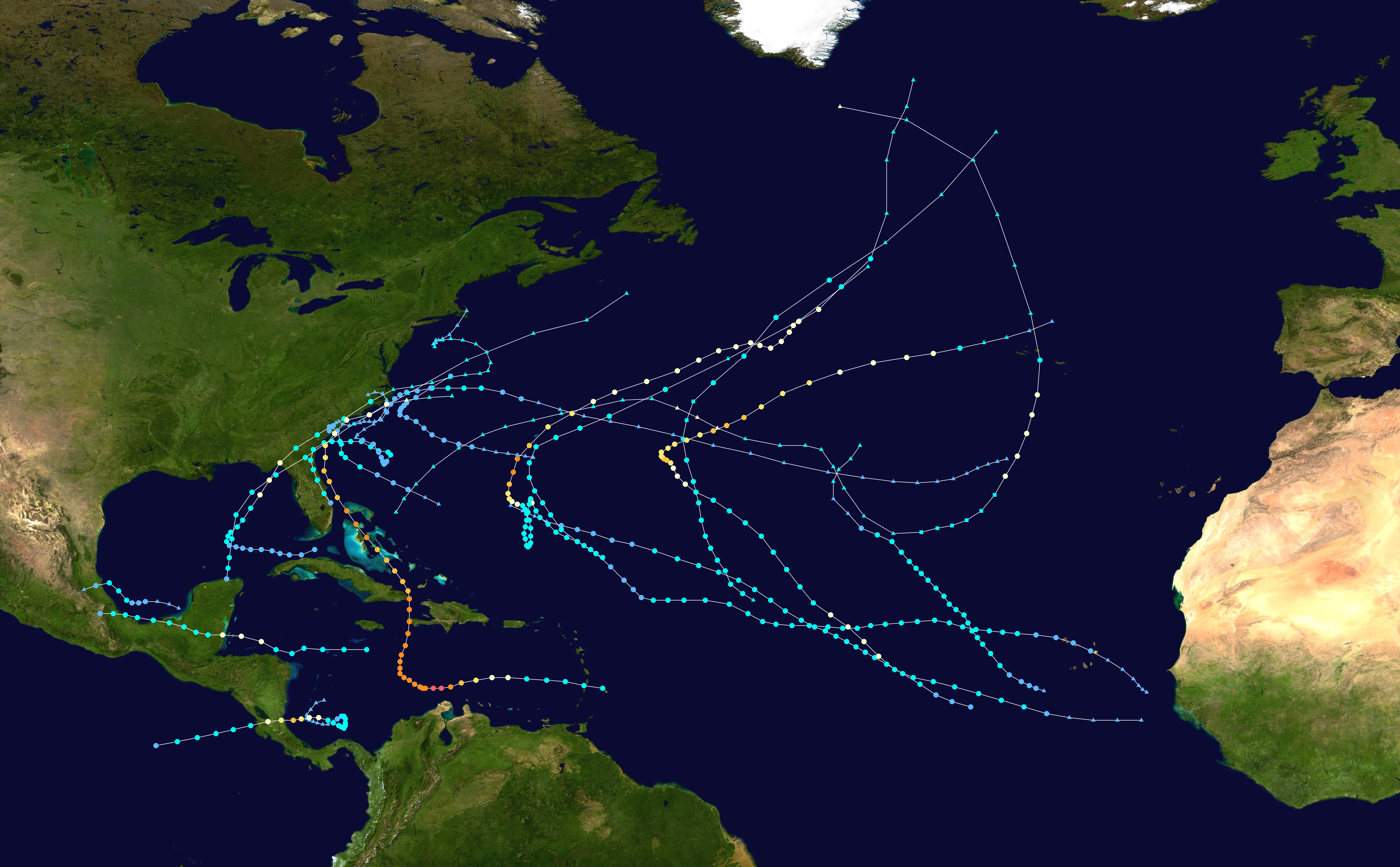
2016 Atlantic hurricane season summary map

The 2016 Atlantic hurricane season officially began on June 1, 2016. It was an above average season and the most active since 2012, producing a total of 15 named storms, 7 hurricanes, and 4 major hurricanes. The first storm, Hurricane Alex, developed on January 12, while the final system, Hurricane Otto, made a crossover to the Eastern Pacific on November 25. The higher-than-normal activity was attributed to many factors. Most significantly, one of the strongest El Niño events recorded in history rapidly dissipated, transforming to cool-neutral conditions across the Pacific in late summer. This led to warmer than normal sea surface temperatures across the Atlantic, though the subtropical regions were slightly cooler than normal; slightly lower than normal sea level pressures; and reduced wind shear, especially in the Caribbean, which had experienced record values of wind shear in the past recent years. Moisture levels, however, were anomalously dry, which likely prevented some of the storms from becoming significant hurricanes. Steering currents had also been different from past years, which had previously had a trough of low pressure dominating the East Coast of the United States. The tropical cyclones of this season caused about $16.1 billion in damage and at least 748 deaths, being the costliest season since 2012, the deadliest since 2008. The Atlantic hurricane season officially ended on November 30, 2016. The season's activity was reflected with an accumulated cyclone energy index of 141 units, which was well above the 1981–2010 median of 92, as well as the highest value since 2010.

The year opened up with an anomalous storm in January: Hurricane Alex, the first such system to develop in January since 1938. Activity picked up at the end of May into June, with three consecutive tropical storms: Bonnie, Colin, and Danielle. The latter two were the earliest third- and fourth-named storms on record. July saw no storm development for the first time in four years, however. August saw the formation of five tropical cyclones, including Earl, Fiona, Gaston, Eight, and Hermine. A Category 1 hurricane, Earl wrought tremendous damage in Belize and Mexico. With 81 lives lost in Mexico during the passage of Earl, it was the deadliest Atlantic hurricane in the country since 2005. Gaston became the season's first major hurricane on August 28, attaining peak winds of 120 mph (195 km/h) over the central Atlantic. On September 1, Hermine struck the Florida Peninsula as a Category 1 hurricane, ending an 11-year drought of hurricane landfalls in the state, which began after Hurricane Wilma in October 2005.

September featured another five tropical cyclones: Ian, Julia, Karl, Lisa, and Matthew, the latter of which persisted into October. Matthew proved to be the most significant storm of the season, becoming the first Category 5 hurricane in the Atlantic since Hurricane Felix in 2007, and, with a death toll of over 600, it was the deadliest in the Atlantic basin since Hurricane Stan in 2005. It subsequently struck Haiti as a Category 4 hurricane, and inflicted catastrophic damage across the impoverished nation. Matthew also caused extensive damage in Cuba, the Bahamas, and the Southeastern United States. Concurrently, Hurricane Nicole meandered south of Bermuda for more than a week before making a direct hit on the territory as a major hurricane. The next four weeks were quiet, until Hurricane Otto formed in the southwestern Caribbean during late November. Otto eventually became the latest-forming major hurricane in the Atlantic basin on record, surpassing a storm in 1934. After striking Nicaragua and becoming the first hurricane on record to pass over Costa Rica, Otto – the final tropical cyclone of the season – then emerged into the Eastern Pacific basin on November 25, the first such occurrence since Hurricane Cesar–Douglas in 1996.

=== Eastern & Central Pacific Oceans ===
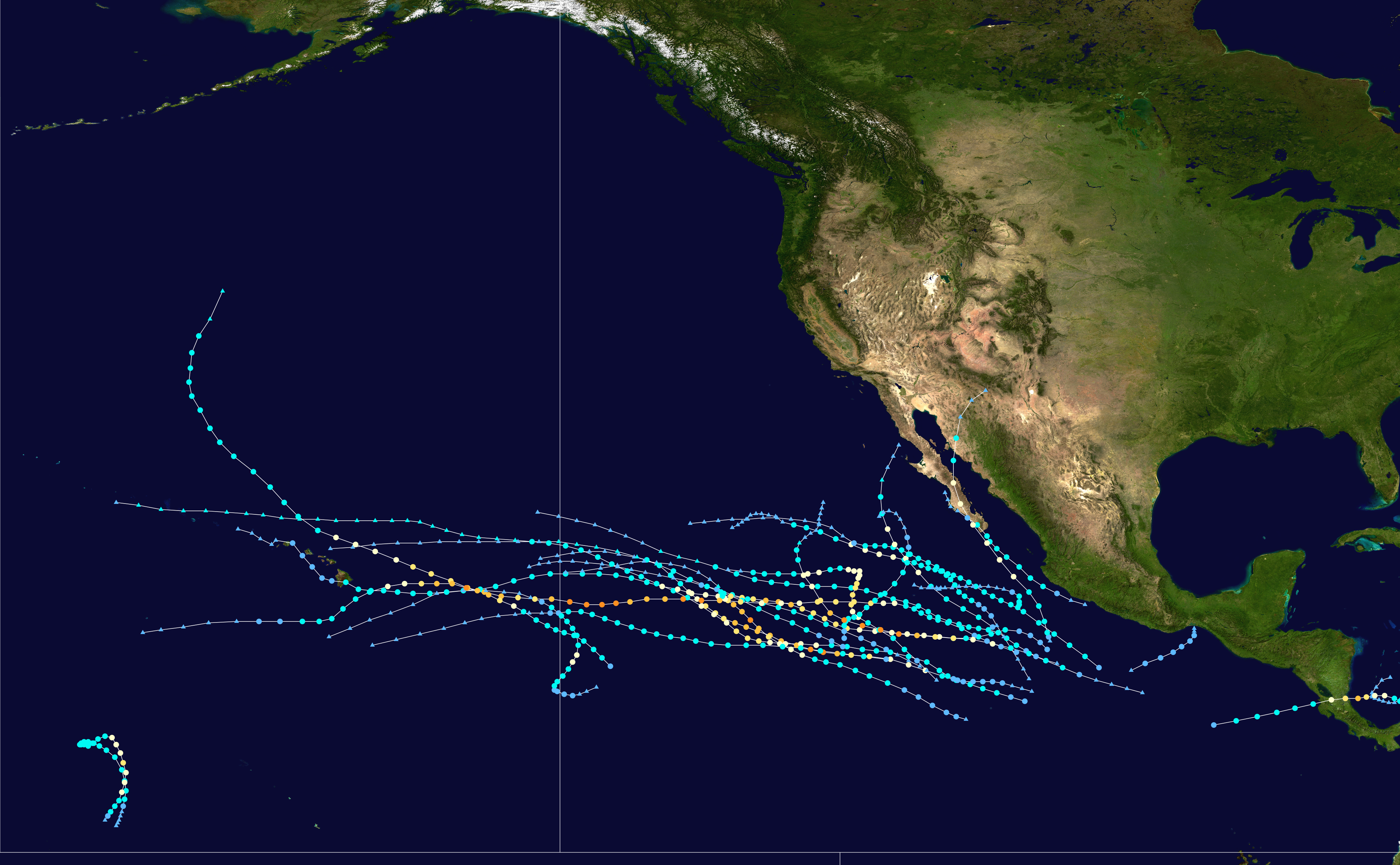
2016 Pacific hurricane season summary map

The season was tied as the fifth-most active season on record, alongside the 2014 season. Throughout the course of the year, a total of 22 named storms, 13 hurricanes and six major hurricanes were observed within the basin. Although the season was very active, it was considerably less active than the previous season, with large gaps of inactivity at the beginning and towards the end of the season. It officially started on May 15 in the eastern Pacific, and on June 1 in the central Pacific; they both ended on November 30. As illustrated by Hurricane Pali, which became the earliest Central Pacific tropical cyclone on record, the formation of tropical cyclones is possible at any time of the year. Although Pali formed in January, the season kicked off to a very inactive start; for the first time since 2011, no tropical depressions or storms formed during the month of May, and no named storms formed during June since 2007.

Agatha formed on July 2, the latest first named storm in the eastern Pacific proper since 1969. Despite this, the season set a record for the most number of storms during the first half of July. When Georgette formed on July 21, it became the seventh named storm to form in the month of July; equaling the previous record set in 1985 and 2015 for the most active July since reliable records began. And when Frank became a hurricane (after Georgette did so), it marked a record-high 5 hurricanes in July. Finally, Howard formed on July 31, however, was not named until August 1, one named storm shy of the record. Despite that, the season tied the record set in 1985 with the most named storms in July. Activity in August was slightly less active than July. Lester and Madeline threatened the Big Island at hurricane strength. Lester passed north of the islands, Madeline brought some rain as the storm dissipated south of Hawaii. Javier and Newton followed similar paths close to the Mexican coast, with both making landfall in the Baja California Peninsula in August and early September respectively. After Newton led off September; Hurricanes Orlene, Paine and Tropical Storm Roslyn followed forming far from land. Hurricane Ulika became the first tropical cyclone on record to cross 140°W three times; it also became the first named storm in the Central Pacific basin since Pali back in January. Ulika was the first storm since Ela in 2015 to form in the Eastern Pacific, but not be named until entering the Central Pacific. After an unusually quiet October, Hurricane Seymour became the sixth major hurricane of the season, as well as the strongest. Tropical Storm Tina formed close to the coast of Mexico in mid-November. In late November, Tropical Storm Otto entered the basin from the Atlantic, becoming the eighteenth tropical cyclone to do so; however, it dissipated quickly due to unfavorable conditions.

=== Western Pacific Ocean ===
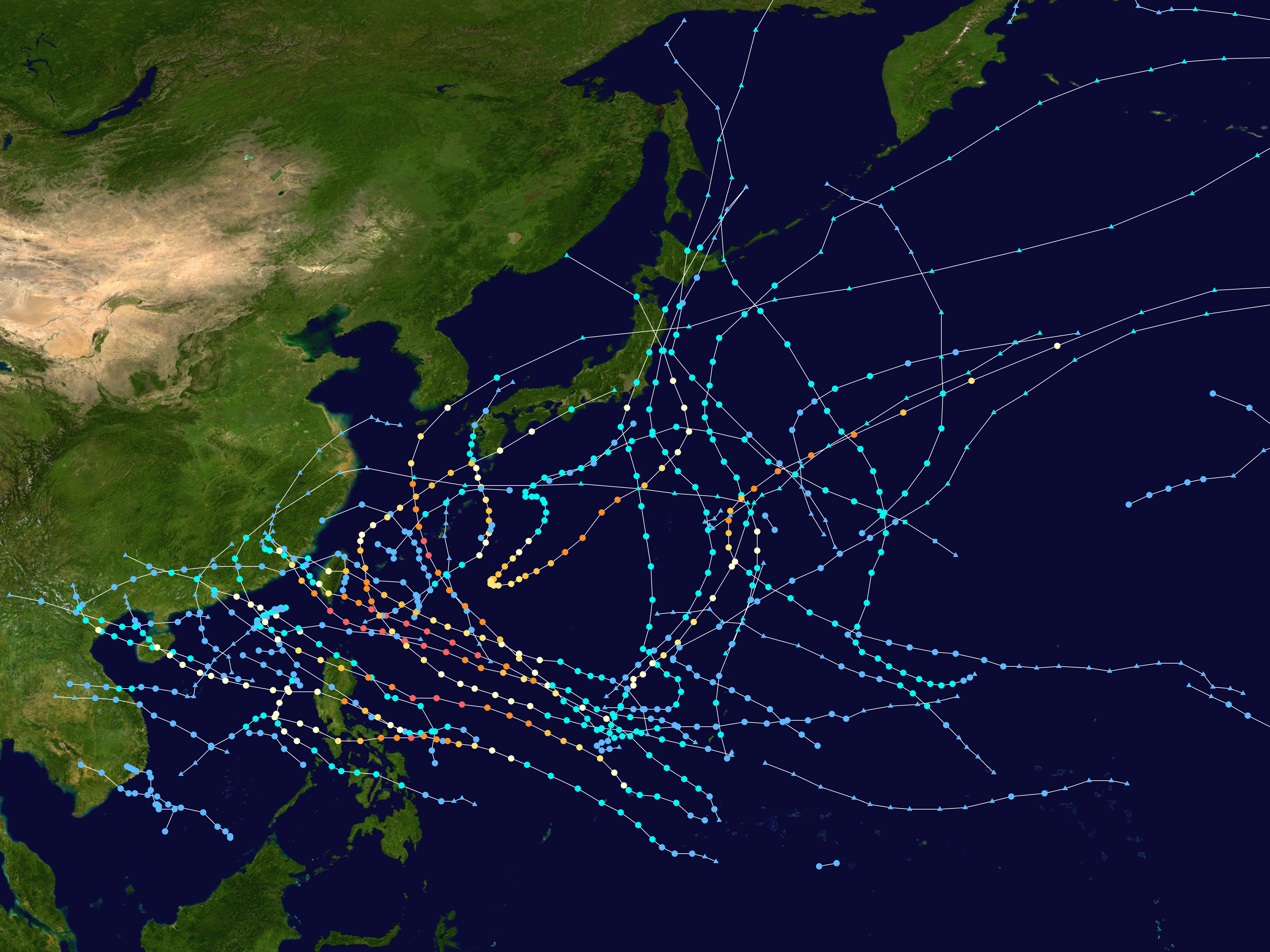
2016 Pacific typhoon season summary map

The 2016 season is considered to have been the fourth-latest start for a Pacific typhoon season since reliable records began. It was an average season, with a total of 26 named storms, 13 typhoons, and six super typhoons. Despite the season's late start, the 2016 season was a normal and active season with a total of 53 tropical depressions, of which 26 became tropical storms. After five months of inactivity, the first tropical depression developed on May 26, making it the fifth-latest season for a system to form. According to existing records only four other seasons started later—the 1973, 1983, 1984, and 1998 seasons. Tropical activity throughout the basin became marginally favorable for development, and two tropical depressions developed during June. On July 3, Nepartak became the first named tropical storm, making it the second-latest first named storm on record. Nepartak's naming ended a 199-day period (from December 17, 2015, to July 2, 2016) during which no named storm was active within the basin; this period tied the 199-day period from December 22, 1997, to July 8, 1998. Nepartak reached Category 5 super typhoon intensity before making landfall in Taiwan and East China, causing a total of US$1.52 billion of damage. In late July, Tropical Storm Mirinae reached its peak intensity while making landfall over Red River Delta in Northern Vietnam. The storm caused a total of US$334 million of damage in Hainan and Vietnam. Later, Nida reached near typhoon strength; it affected the Philippines, South China and Vietnam, but its damage was lower than that of Mirinae. The season became more active in August, with 7 named storms. Except Dianmu, which affected South China, Indochina, all of the tropical cyclones in August affected Japan and the Russian Far East. By the end of August, three storms (Chanthu, Lionrock and Kompasu) had hit the Japanese island of Hokkaidō, the most since 1951. Lionrock was a large, powerful, long-lived and erratic tropical cyclone which caused significant flooding and casualties in North Korea and Japan in late August.

In September, Typhoon Meranti became the strongest typhoon in terms of pressure since Typhoon Megi in 2010, as well as the strongest typhoon in terms of sustained winds since Typhoon Haiyan in 2013, and the second-strongest tropical cyclone worldwide in 2016, only behind Cyclone Winston, in terms of pressure. Typhoon Megi reached its peak intensity as a Category 3 typhoon while making landfall over Taiwan. Both Meranti and Megi made landfall in Fujian, China, and they caused a total of US$3.6 billion of damage. Rai became a weak tropical storm before it made landfall in Vietnam, Laos and Thailand in mid-September, causing flooding and moderate damage. Typhoon Malakas impacted Japan with a total of nearly $740 million of damage as a Category 4 typhoon. In late September and early October, Typhoon Chaba reached Category 5 super typhoon intensity and became the strongest tropical cyclone to make landfall in South Korea since Sanba in 2012. Chaba also caused 7 deaths in the country. A tropical depression formed east of the International Date Line on October 3, and entered the basin before developing into Typhoon Songda. Songda struck the Pacific Northwest region of the United States and Canada as a powerful extratropical cyclone. Severe Tropical Storm Aere affected parts of Southeast Asia in mid-October, including the worst flooding in Vietnam since 2010, causing a total of US$209 million of damage. Later, Typhoon Sarika became a powerful typhoon, and affected the Philippines, China and Vietnam, causing severe damage as well as severe flooding in southern China. After Sarika, Typhoon Haima reached Category 5 super typhoon strength before impacting the Philippines and China, causing a total of US$1.93 billion in damages. Haima was the most severe tropical cyclone to affect Hong Kong in October since 1995. In early November, a tropical depression made landfall in Southern Vietnam and caused heavy flooding throughout central and southern Vietnam, causing moderate damage. In late December, Nock-ten became the strongest Christmas tropical cyclone on record anywhere in the world since at least 1960 in terms of 1-minute sustained winds, before impacting the Philippines.

By September, seven named storms in the western Pacific had reached Category 4 or 5 intensity.

=== North Indian Ocean ===
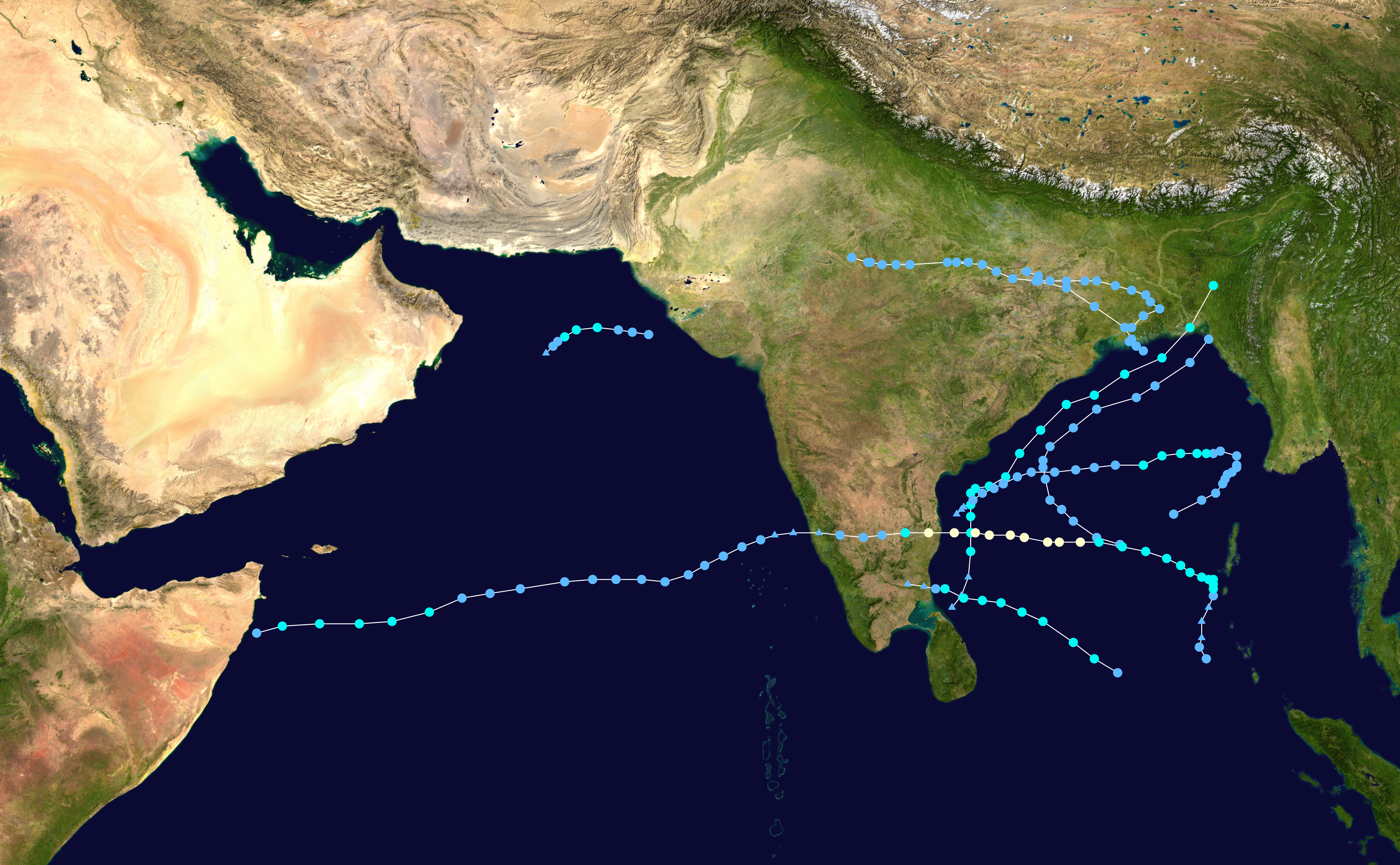
2016 North Indian Ocean cyclone season summary map

The 2016 season was the deadliest season since 2010, killing more than 400 people. The season was an average one, seeing four named storms, with one further intensifying into a very severe cyclonic storm. The season officially started with the formation of Cyclone Roanu over in the Bay of Bengal on 17 May. The beginning of June witnessed no storms, although many low-pressure areas formed over Bay of Bengal, but none of them intensified into a depression, due to a very strong southwest monsoon. At the end of June, Depression ARB 01 formed, but weakened within two days. July witnessed no storms until a deep depression formed in August, under the influence of an upper air cyclonic circulation over Gangetic West Bengal. However, multiple low-pressure areas developed over the Bay of Bengal, with Cyclonic Storm Kyant forming in October and Cyclonic Storm Nada in November. Due to the presence of warm sea surface temperatures, Very Severe Cyclone Vardah formed in December.

=== South-West Indian Ocean ===
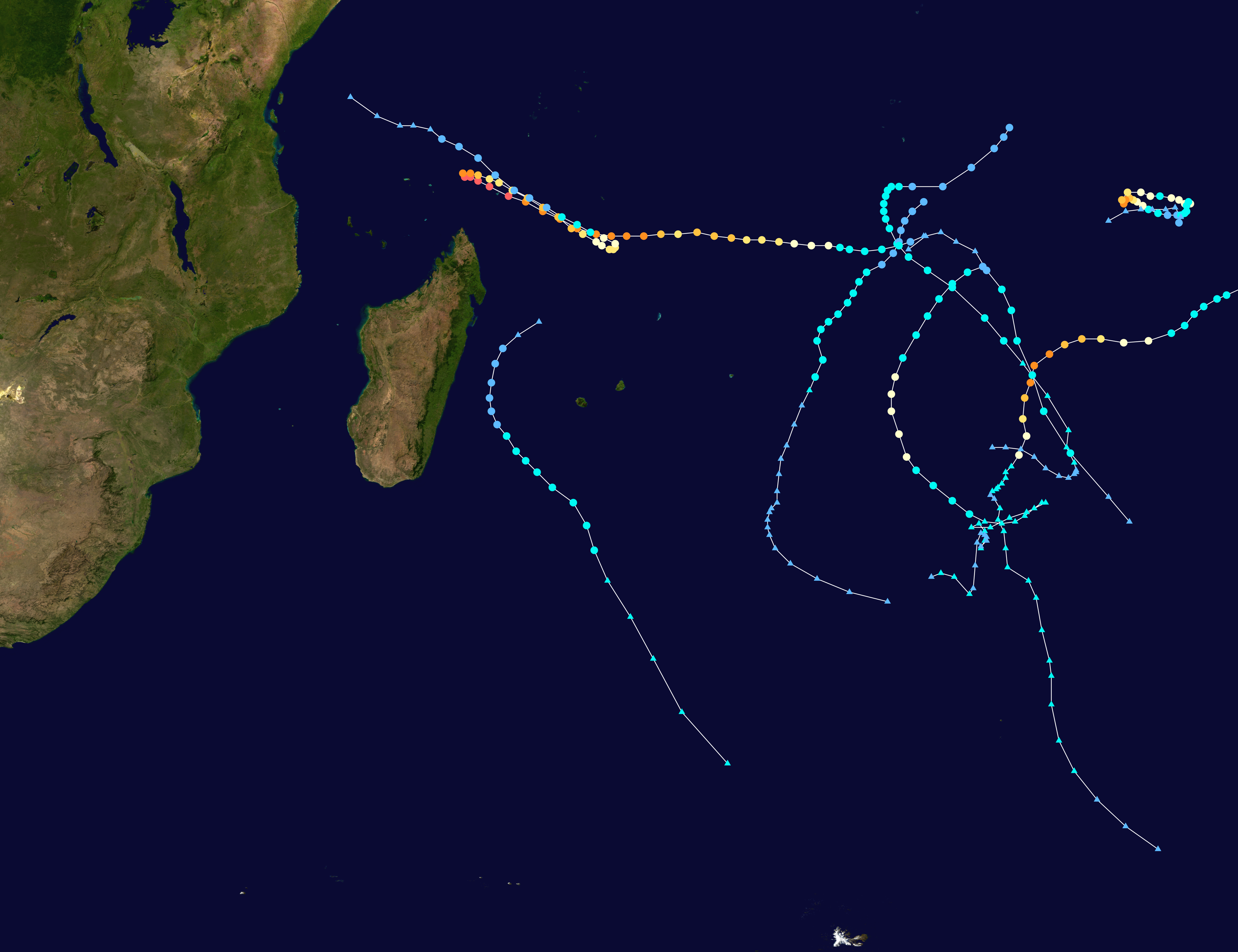
2015–16 South-West Indian Ocean cyclone season summary map

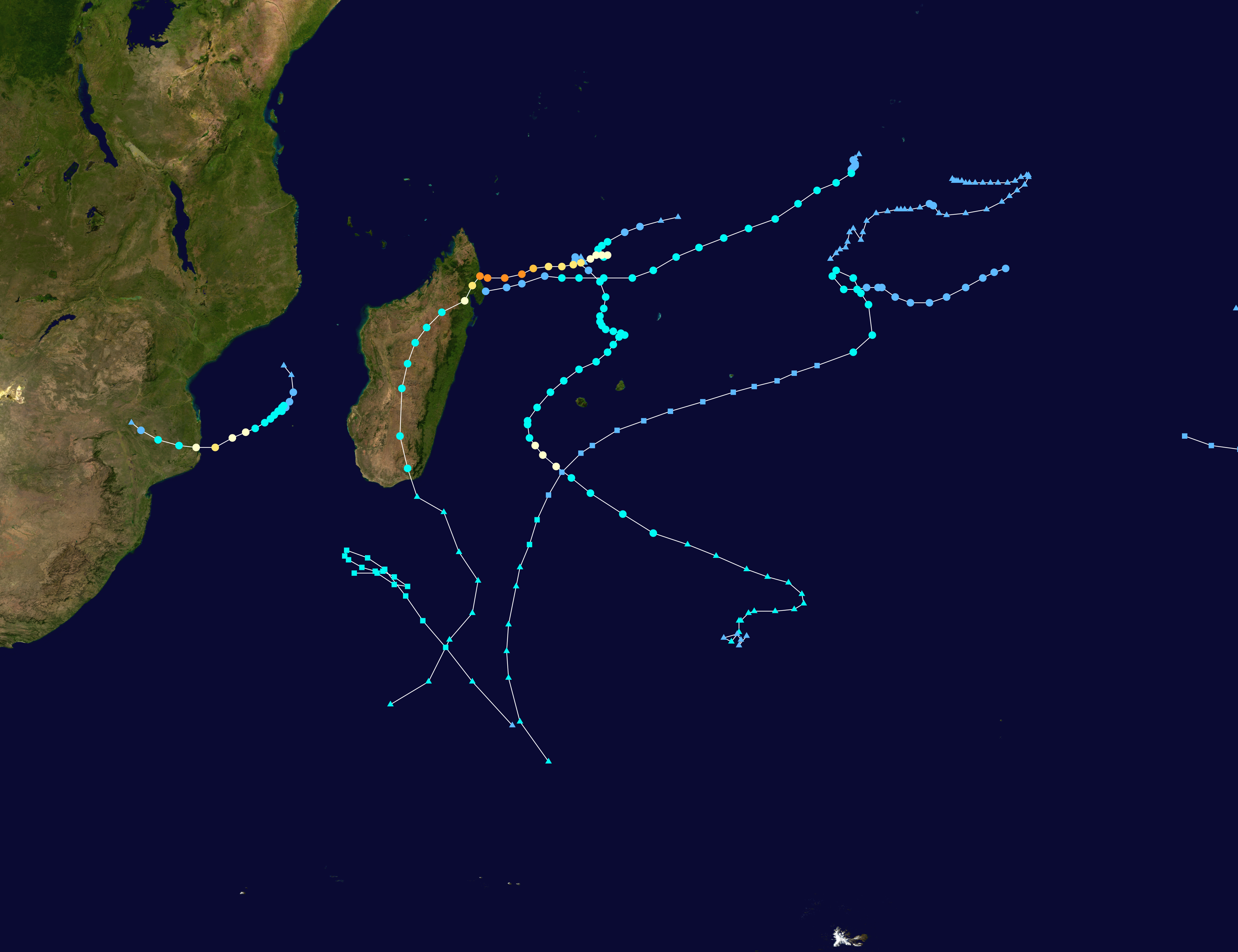
2016–17 South-West Indian Ocean cyclone season summary map

==== January–June ====
Five named storms were formed, including one which was unnamed and another one was crossed from the Australian region. Corentin formed on January 20. In February, the basin became somewhat active with Daya forming, and Uriah entering the basin days later. Emeraude formed in March, quickly peaking at intense tropical cyclone strength, before quickly weakening. Moderate Tropical Storm 07 formed at the end of March. In April, the season began to wind down. Very Intense Tropical Cyclone Fantala formed near the end of the month, and reached peak intensity as the strongest tropical cyclone recorded in the basin in terms of sustained winds. Fantala dissipated on April 24, ending the season.

==== July–December ====
Two systems were formed in 2016, in fact was the least active.

=== Australian Region ===
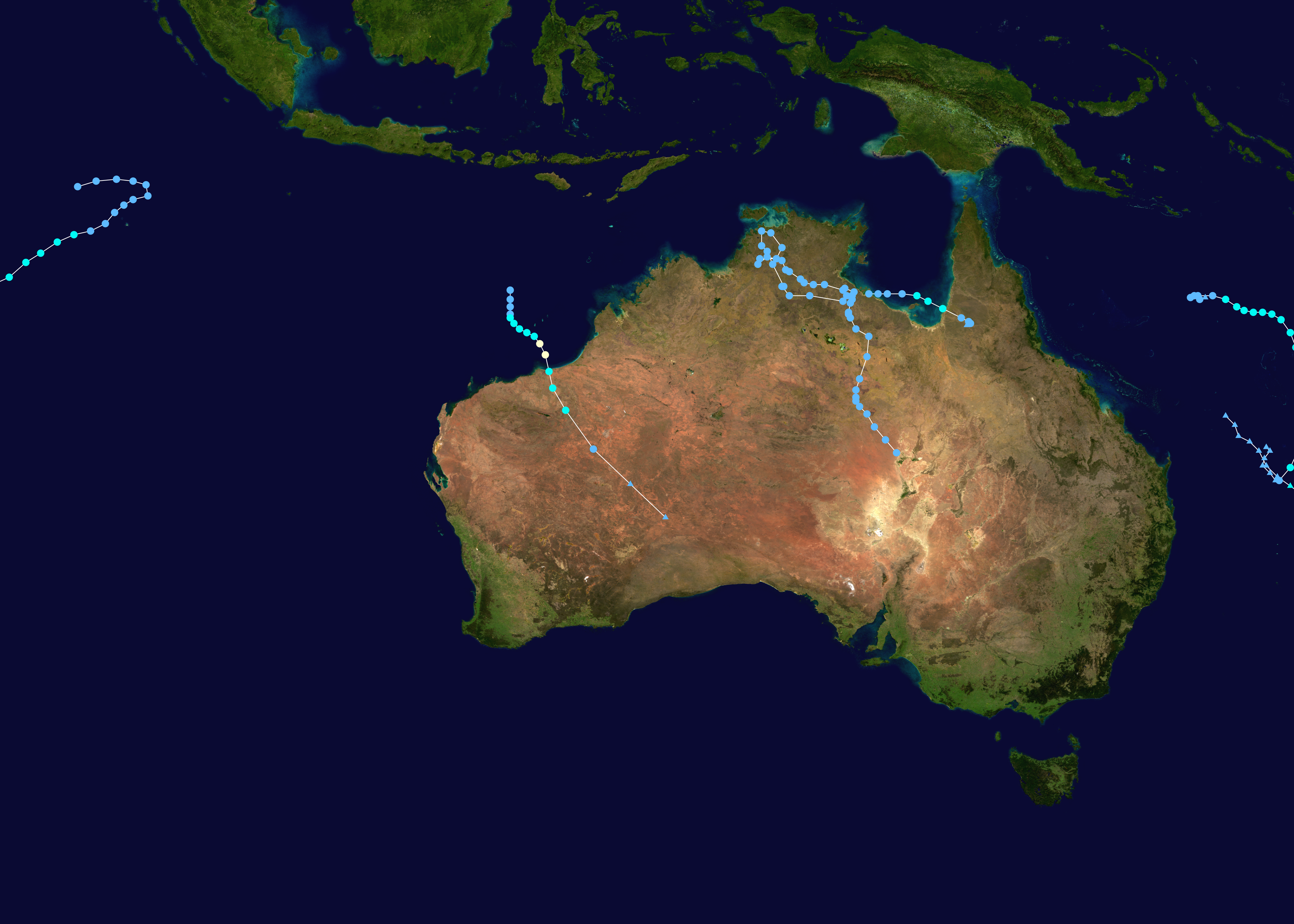
2015–16 Australian region cyclone season summary map

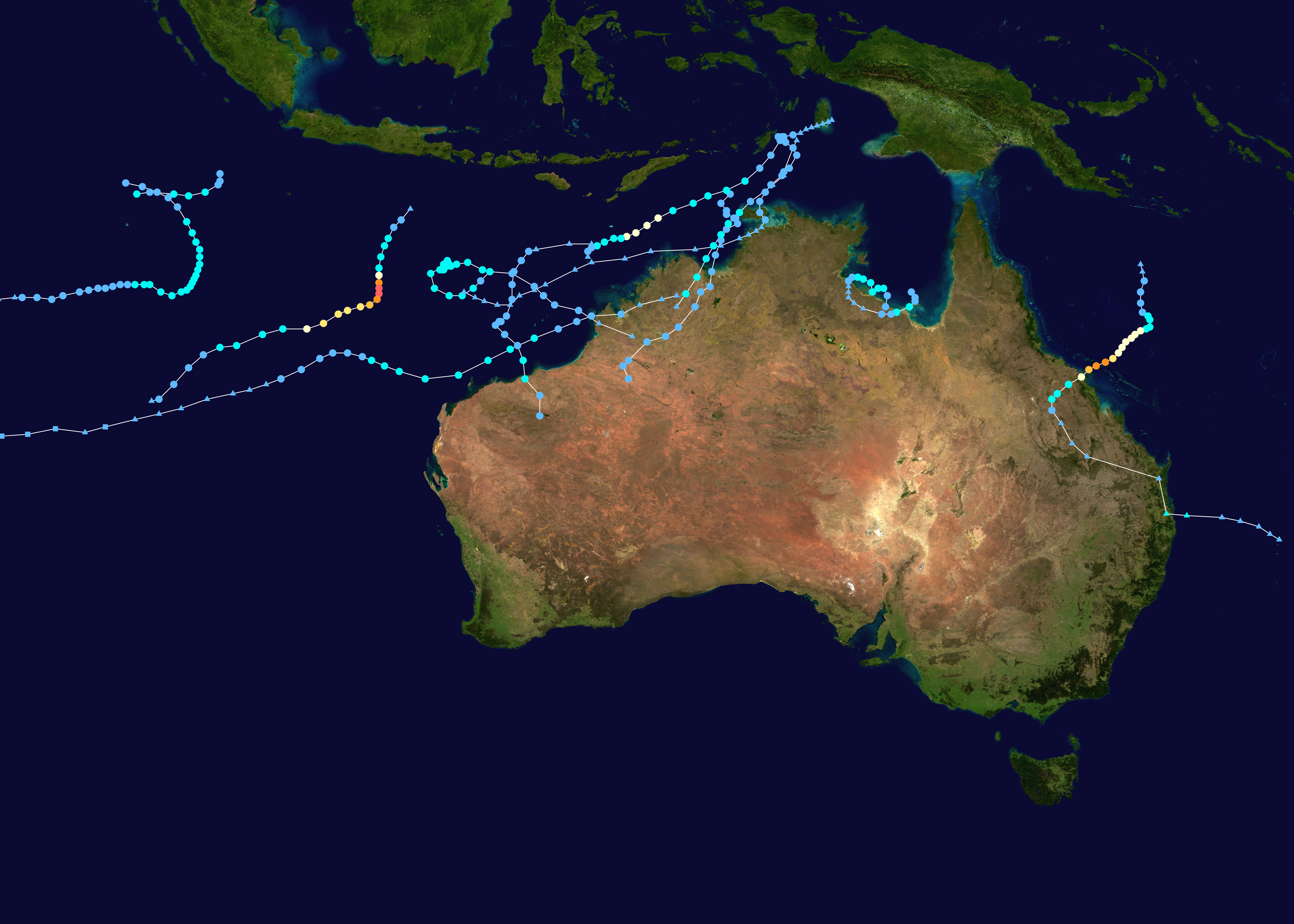
2016–17 Australian region cyclone season summary map

==== January–June ====
During the season only three tropical cyclones developed within the Australian region, which meant that the season was considered to be the least active season since reliable records started in 1969. This low activity was partially attributed to the 2014–16 El Niño event, which caused systems to be displaced eastwards into the South Pacific tropical cyclone basin. A positive Indian Ocean Dipole event caused cooler-than-normal waters in tropical eastern Indian Ocean, near Indonesia, which in turn limited development near Western Australia during the first part of the season.

Stan subsequently made landfall on Western Australia and impacted various commodities including oil, natural gas, and iron ore. However, impacts were limited due to the low population of the region. The precursor tropical low to Tropical Cyclone Uriah developed over the Indian Ocean, within a monsoon trough of low pressure during 9 February. The system subsequently developed further and was named Uriah during 13 February, before it moved out of the region during the following day. Tropical Cyclone Tatiana developed into a tropical cyclone, during 11 February while it was located over the Coral Sea. Over the next few days, the system remained over water and dissipated during 15 February after it had produced some powerful, long period swells along Queensland beaches. After Tatiana dissipated four tropical lows occurred in the region before the season ended on 30 April, including the remnant tropical low of Severe Tropical Cyclone Winston.

==== July–December ====
Eight systems and one named storms were formed in 2016. Specifically one of the storms that formed during the July-December season of the Australian region was that of Tropical Cyclone 02S, which was originally observed by NASA's GPM team. NASA reported on December 19th, 2016, that the tropical storm "was dropping rain at a rate of over 127mm (5 inches) per hour."

=== South Pacific Ocean ===
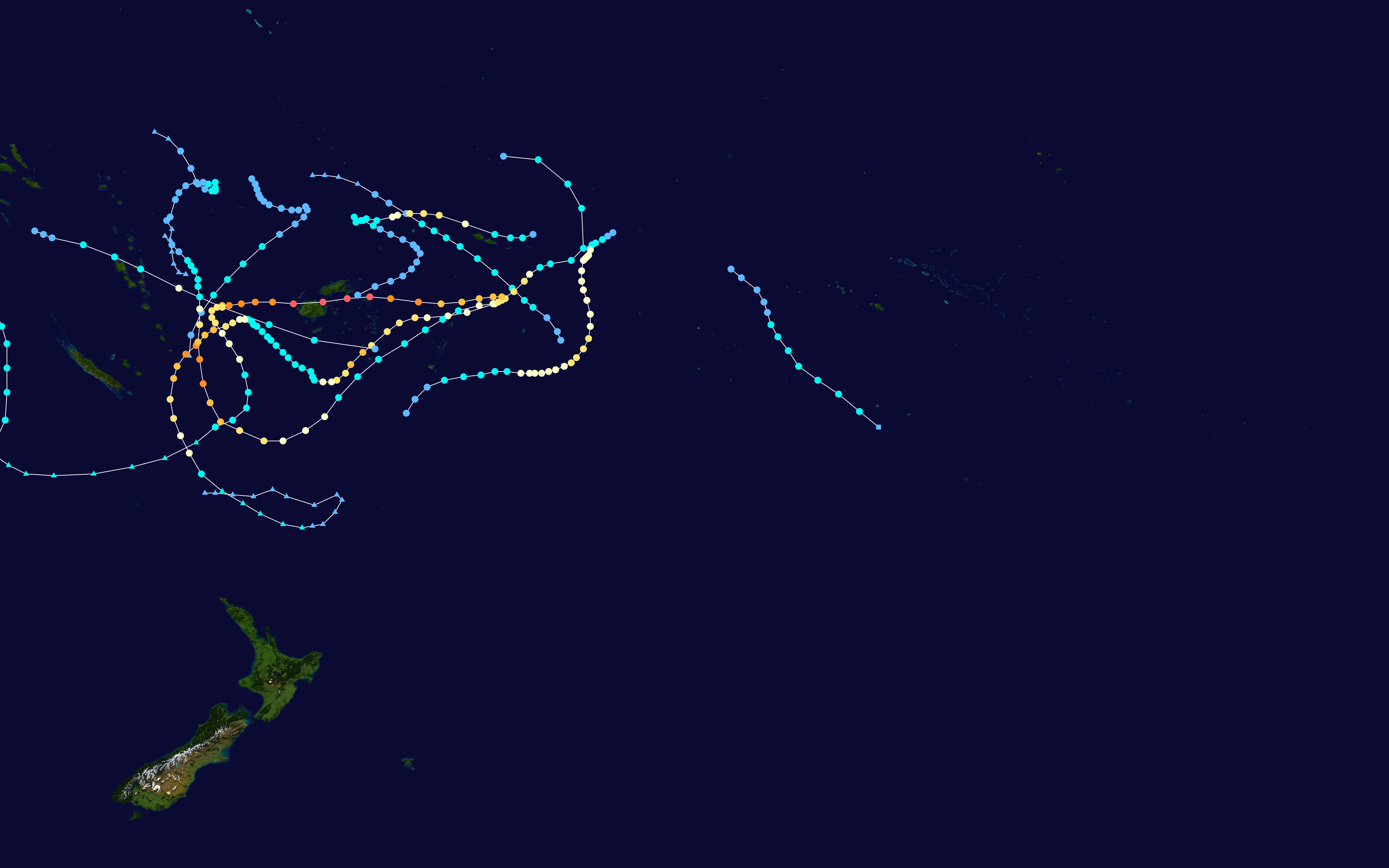
2015–16 South Pacific Ocean cyclone season summary map

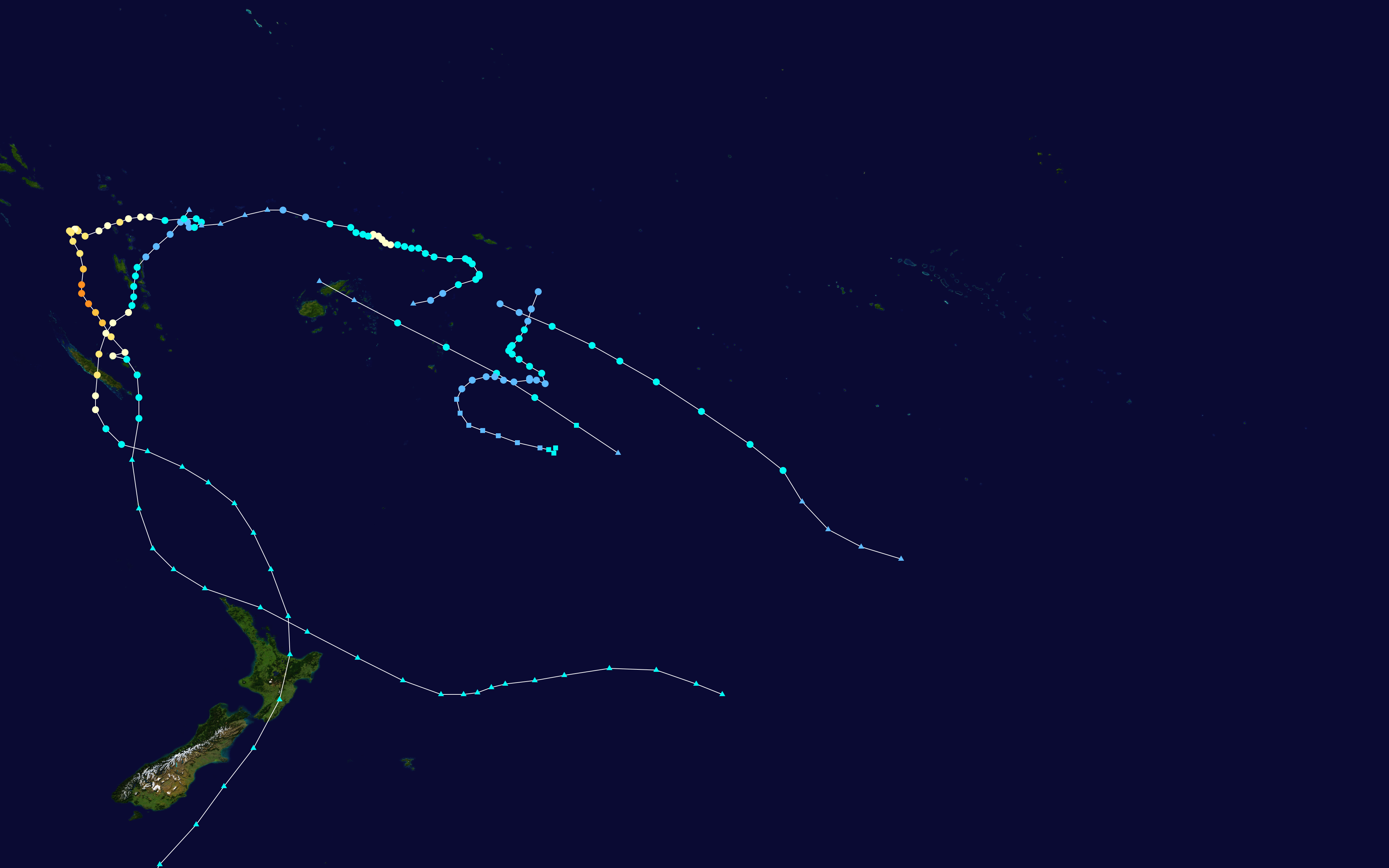
2016–17 South Pacific Ocean cyclone season summary map

==== January–June ====
The season was one of the most disastrous South Pacific tropical cyclone seasons on record, with a total of 50 deaths and $1.405 billion (2016 USD) in damage. Throughout the season, 8 systems attained tropical cyclone status, whilst 5 became severe tropical cyclones. The most notable cyclone of the season by far was Winston, which attained a minimum pressure of 884 hPa (mbar; 26.10 inHg), and maximum ten-minute sustained winds of 175 mph (280 km/h), making it the most intense tropical cyclone on record in the Southern Hemisphere. Winston went on to devastate Fiji, causing $1.4 billion (2016 USD) in damage and 44 deaths across the country.

Meanwhile, 06F developed to the north of Wallis Island, but was absorbed by Cyclone Ula. Victor ended the first slew of storms, dissipating on January 24. Following this, the basin was dormant for three weeks; however, a slew of storms began forming in February. Winston led off the month, forming on February 7. Similar to Ula, the storm attained a preliminary peak, weakened, but later rapidly re-intensified into a Category 5 severe tropical cyclone, making landfall near Suva, Fiji, at peak strength. This made Winston the strongest tropical cyclone on record to impact Fiji. Winston then moved southwest, out of the basin, on February 26, dissipating on March 1. Cyclone Tatiana briefly moved into the basin on February 12, but dissipated the next day, as it exited the basin. Cyclone Yalo and a tropical depression followed to this: Yalo dissipated on February 26, while 12F dissipated on March 1. The basin became dormant again as the season wound down. Despite this, Tropical Depression 13F formed on March 19, and dissipated three days later. The basin once again became dormant again, as the end of March neared, until another tropical depression formed in early April. One of the three depressions became Cyclone Zena, which caused more problems to the nearly decimated Fiji. Cyclone Amos formed in late April and moved over Samoa and American Samoa.

==== July–December ====
After a near average but destructive tropical cyclone season during the previous year, the first tropical disturbance of the season developed to the north-northeast of Niue during November 12. However, over the next few months, no named tropical cyclones developed. This was attributed to a number of factors, including a poorly organised South Pacific convergence zone and a predicted La Niña episode not developing.

=== South Atlantic Ocean ===
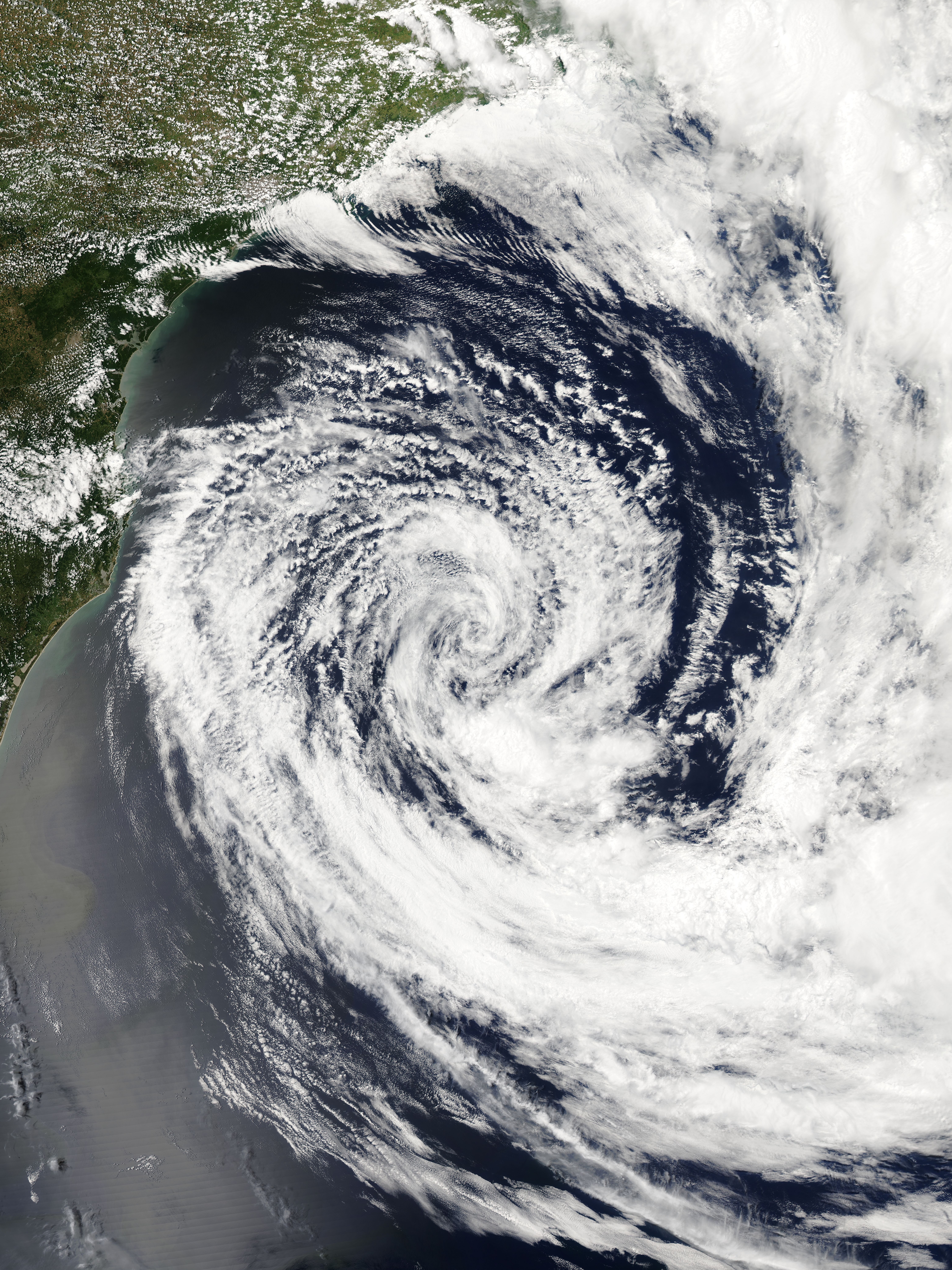
Subtropical Storm Eçaí, the strongest subtropical or tropical cyclone of 2016.

Three systems and two named subtropical or tropical storms were formed in 2016. On 5 January 2016, the Hydrographic Center of the Brazilian Navy issued warnings on a subtropical depression that formed east of Vitória, Espírito Santo. On the next day, the system strengthened into a tropical depression, and other agencies considered the system an invest, designating it as 90Q; however, on 7 January, the tropical depression dissipated.

A subtropical depression formed southwest of Rio de Janeiro on 15 November 2016. It intensified into a subtropical storm and received the name Deni on 16 November. Moving south-southeastwards, Deni soon became extratropical shortly before 00:00 UTC on 17 November.

An extratropical cyclone entered the South Atlantic Ocean from Santa Catarina early on 4 December 2016. Later, it intensified quickly and then transitioned into a subtropical storm shortly before 22:00 BRST (00:00 UTC on 5 December), with the name Eçaí assigned by the Hydrographic Center of the Brazilian Navy. Eçaí started to decay on 5 December, and weakened into a subtropical depression at around 00:00 UTC on 6 December.

=== Mediterranean Sea ===
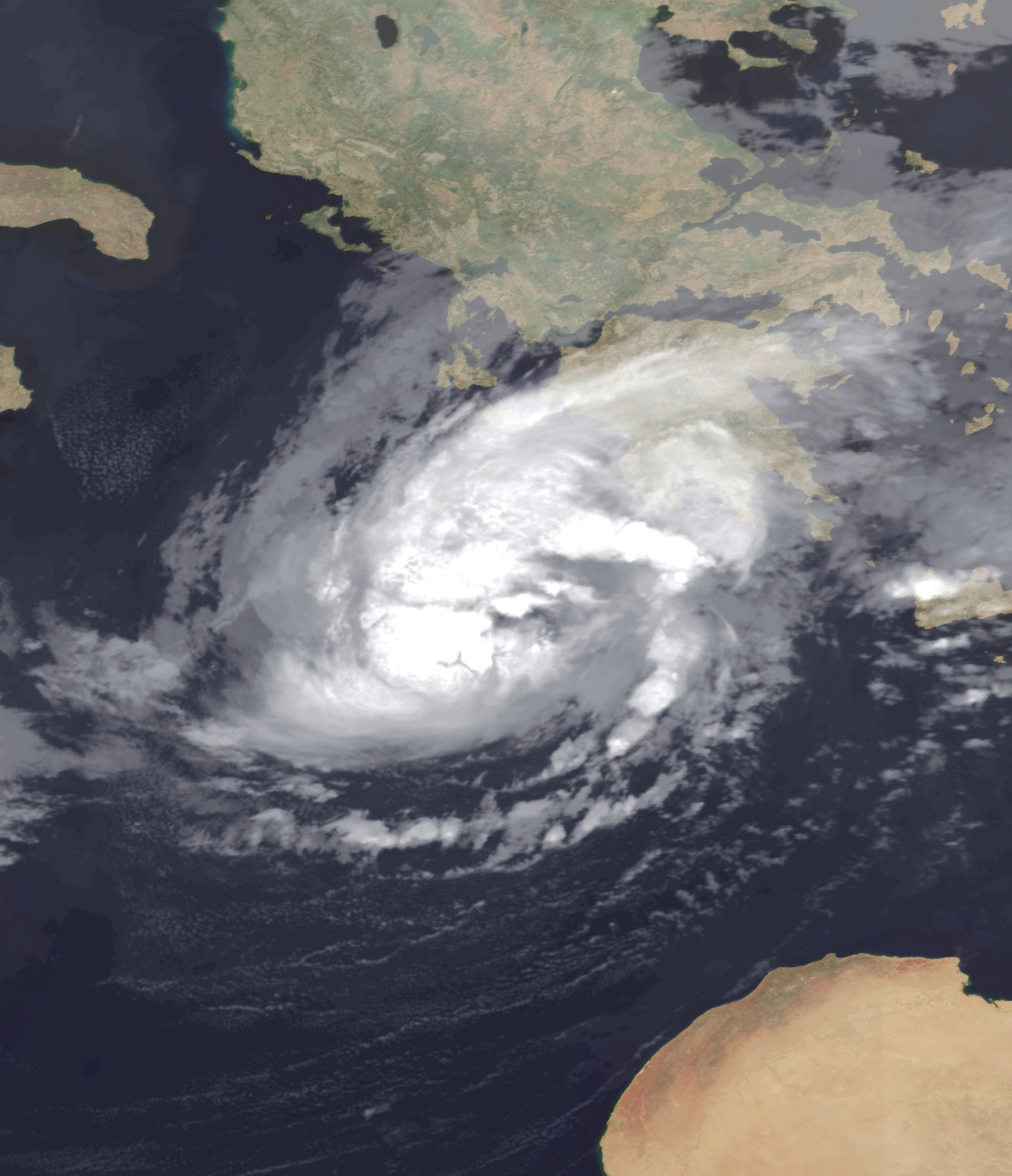
90M on 31 October 2016

Two tropical system were formed in Mediterranean Ocean during 2016. Early on 28 October 2016, 56 km/h (35 mph) an extratropical cyclone began to develop to the south of Calabria, in the Ionian sea. The system quickly intensified, attaining wind speeds of 80 km/h (50 mph) as it slowly moved to the west, causing high waves and minor damage to cars near the Maltese city of Valletta, weakening the following day and beginning to move eastwards. However, later that day, it began to re-intensify and underwent a tropical transition. At 12:00 UTC on 30 October, the system showed 10-minute sustained winds of 104 km/h (64 mph; 56 kn). It became a tropical storm on 31 October. After passing over Crete, the storm began to quickly weaken, with the storm degenerating into an extratropical low on 1 November. Tropical Storm 90M was also nicknamed "Medicane Trixi" by some media outlets in Europe during its duration. No fatalities or rainfall statistics have been reported for this system that was over open waters for most of the time.

== Systems ==
=== January ===
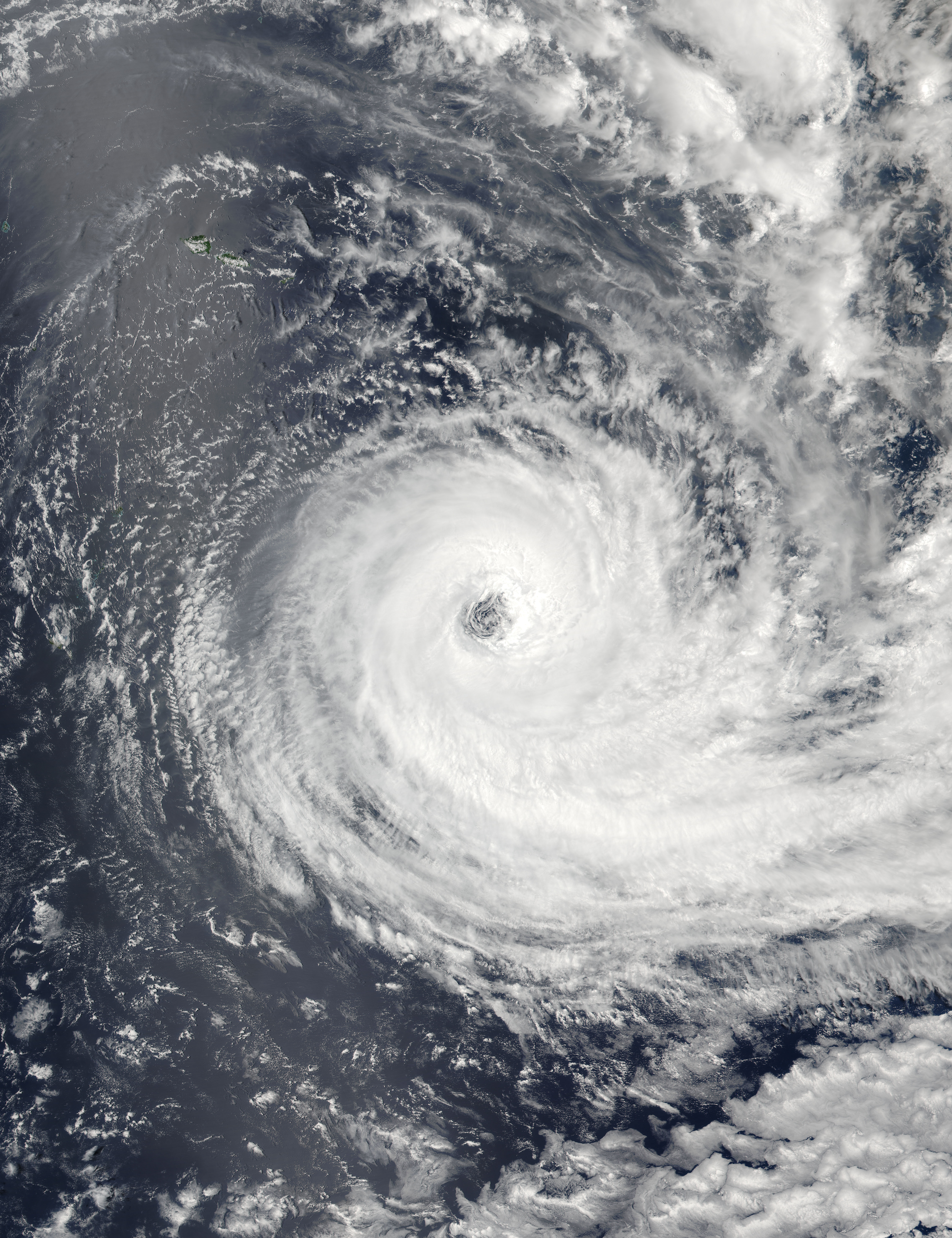
Cyclone Victor

January was above average activity in terms of systems formed, with seven tropical cyclones, of which five were named. The month began with the rare formation of a subtropical depression in the South Atlantic. Hurricane Pali became the earliest tropical cyclone ever recorded in the Pacific Ocean, surpassing Tropical Storm Winona in 1989. The Atlantic hurricane season began with the formation of Hurricane Alex on January 12, making the first Atlantic hurricane to occur in January since Hurricane Alice of 1954–1955. Unrelated to Alex, the formation of Hurricane Pali over the Central Pacific in early January coincided with Alex's development over the Atlantic. This marked the first occurrence of simultaneous January tropical cyclones between these two basins. Severe Tropical Storm Corentin formed off the coast of the Southwest Indian Ocean, while in the South Pacific Cyclone Victor was formed.

Tropical cyclones formed in January 2016
Storm name	Dates active	Max wind km/h (mph)	Pressure (hPa)	Areas affected	Damage (USD)	Deaths	Refs
#01-2016	January 5–7	55 (35)	1006	Brazil	None	None	
Pali	January 7–14	155 (100)	978	Kiribati	Unknown	4	
Alex	January 12–15	140 (85)	981	Bermuda, Azores	Minimal	1	
Victor	January 14–22	150 (90)	958	Northern Cook Islands, Niue, Tonga	None	None	
07U	January 19–25	Unknown	Unknown	None	None	None	
Corentin	January 20–25	110 (70)	970	None	None	None	
Stan	January 27–31	100 (65)	980	Western Australia, South Australia, Victoria	Unknown	None	

=== February ===
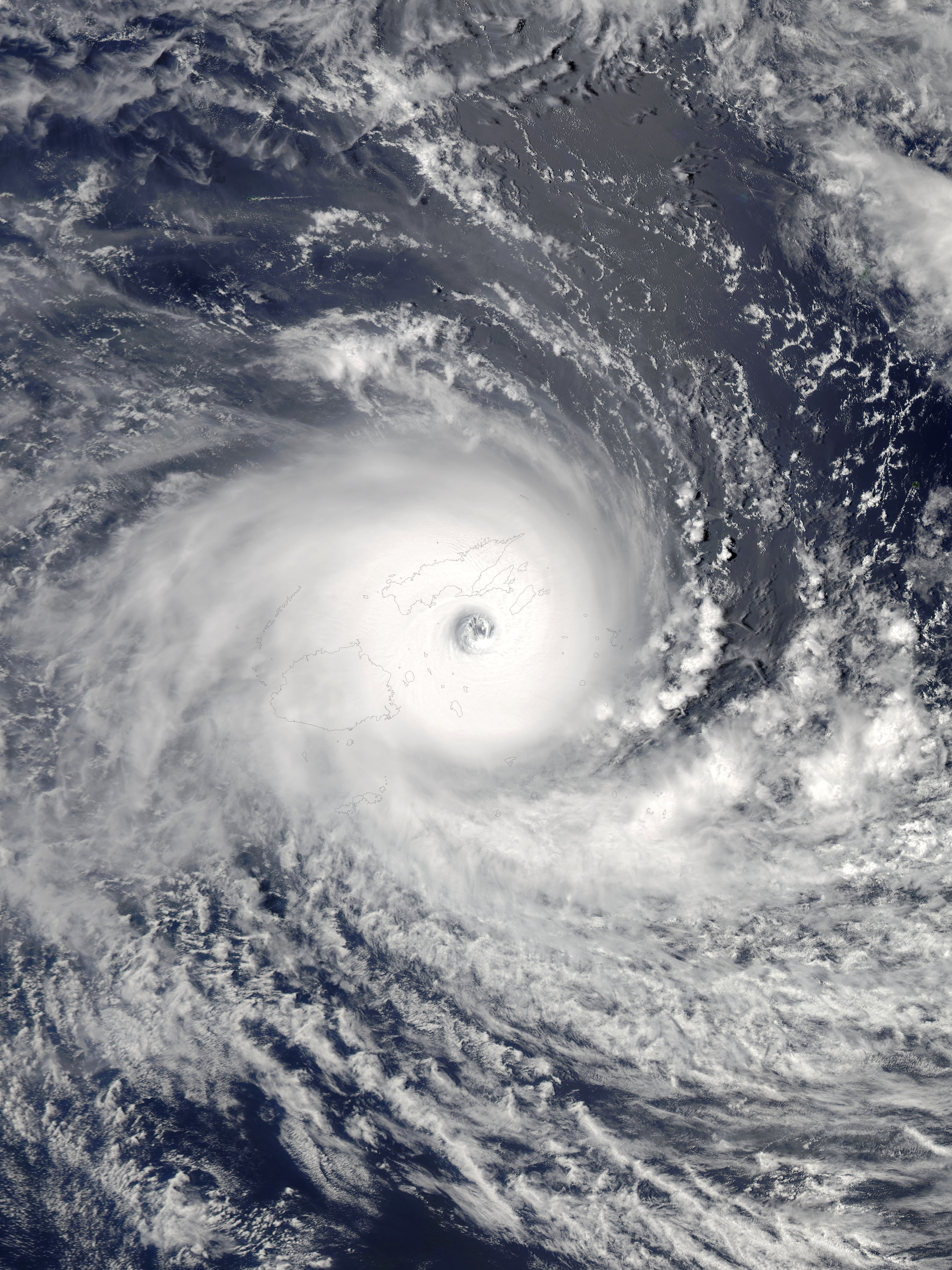
Cyclone Winston

Tropical cyclones formed in February 2016
Storm name	Dates active	Max wind km/h (mph)	Pressure (hPa)	Areas affected	Damage (USD)	Deaths	Refs
Winston	February 7- March 3	280 (175)	884	Vanuatu, Fiji, Tonga, Niue	$1.4 billion	44	
Daya	February 8–12	75 (45)	992	Madagascar, Réunion, Mauritius	Unknown	None	
Uriah	February 9–19	205 (125)	925	Cocos (Keeling) Islands	Minor	None	
Tatiana	February 9–14	95 (60)	982	Queensland	None	None	
11U	February 14–16	Unknown	Unknown	None	None	None	
Yalo	February 24–26	75 (45)	993	Cook Islands, French Polynesia	None	None	
12F	February 29–March 1	Unknown	1000	French Polynesia	None	None	

=== March ===
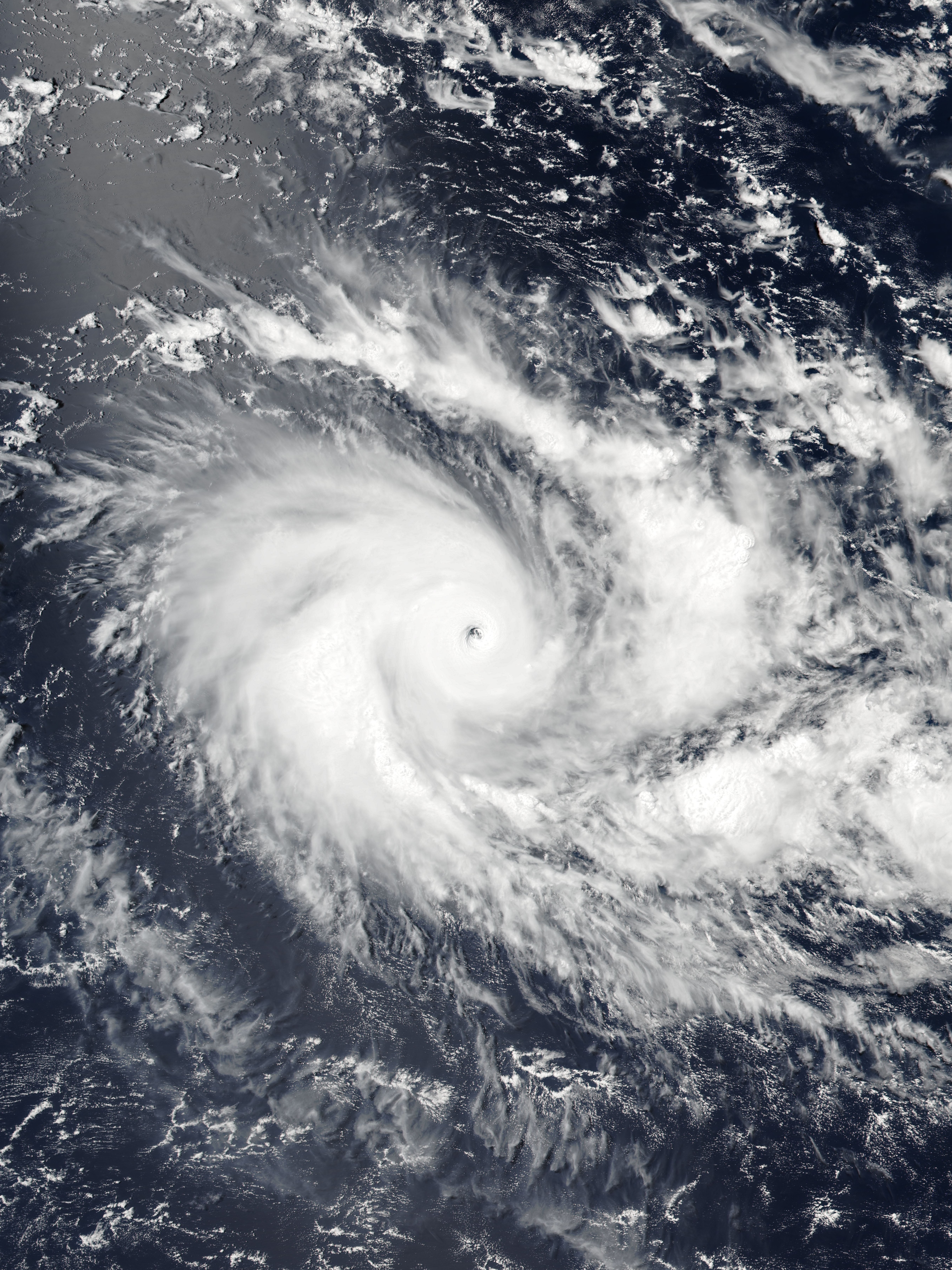
Cyclone Emeraude

Tropical cyclones formed in March 2016
Storm name	Dates active	Max wind km/h (mph)	Pressure (hPa)	Areas affected	Damage (USD)	Deaths	Refs
12U	March 1–6	65 (40)	1000	None	None	None	
14U	March 14–16	55 (35)	998	Northern Territory, Queensland	None	None	
Emeraude	March 15–21	205 (125)	940	None	None	None	
13F	March 19–22	Unknown	998	New Caledonia, Vanuatu	None	None	
07	March 28–30	85 (50)	992	None	None	None	

=== April ===
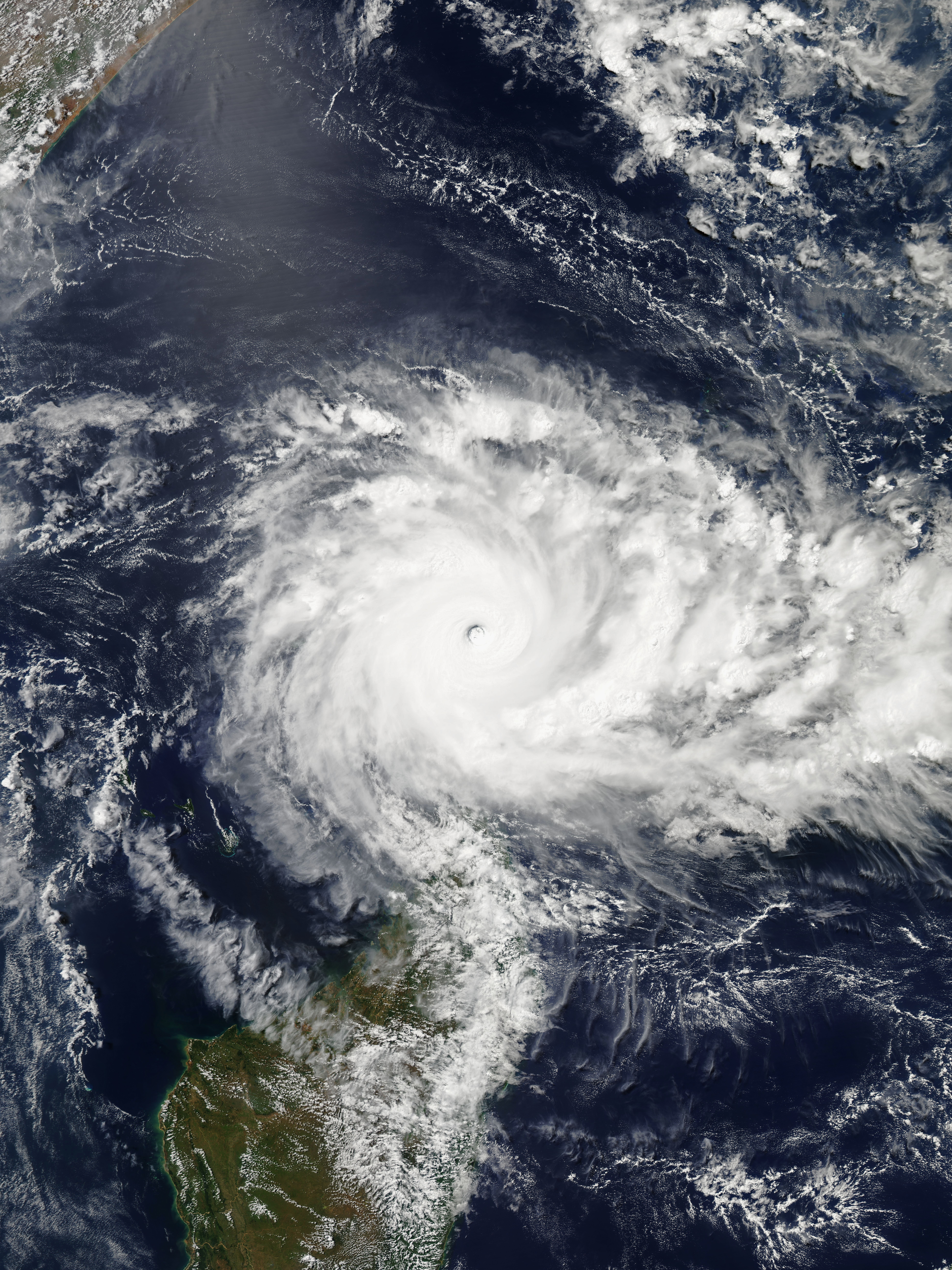
Cyclone Fantala

Tropical cyclones formed in April 2016
Storm name	Dates active	Max wind km/h (mph)	Pressure (hPa)	Areas affected	Damage (USD)	Deaths	Refs
14F	April 1–5	Unknown	1002	Vanuatu	None	None	
15F	April 2–6	Unknown	998	Fiji	None	None	
Zena	April 5–7	130 (80)	975	Solomon Islands, Vanuatu, Fiji, Tonga	Minimal	2	
Fantala	April 11–23	250 (155)	910	Agaléga, Seychelles, Madagascar, Tanzania	$4.5 million	13	
Amos	April 20–24	150 (90)	965	Fiji, Wallis and Futuna, Samoan Islands	Minimal	None	
18F	April 20–27	Unknown	1002	French Polynesia	None	None	

=== May ===
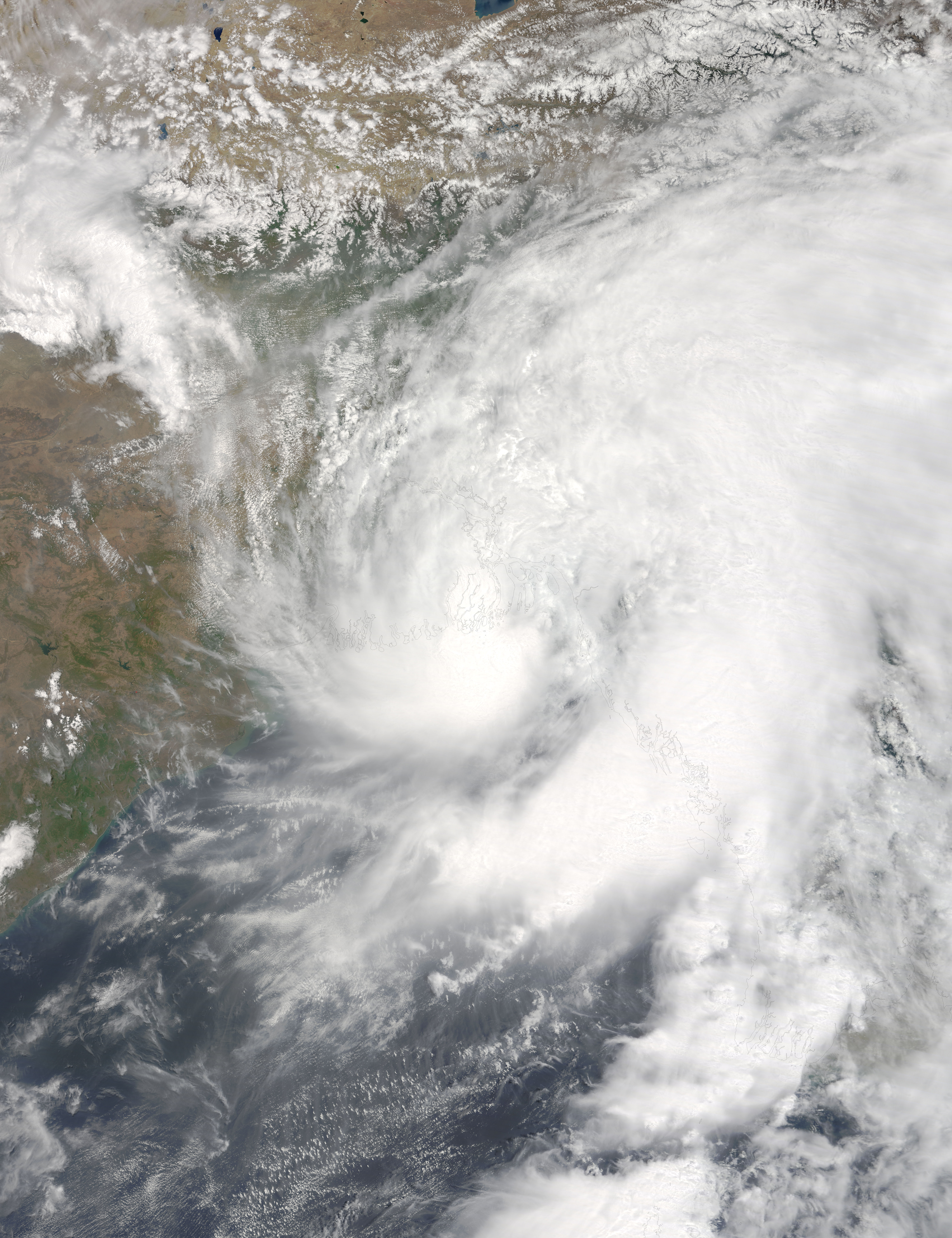
Cyclone Roanu

In May, three storms formed, and two received names, making May an unusually inactive month. In the Atlantic, Bonnie formed, and caused little damage to The Bahamas and the Southeastern United States. In the North Indian Ocean, Roanu caused severe impacts to Sri Lanka, India, Bangladesh, Myanmar, and Yunnan.

Tropical cyclones formed in May 2016
Storm name	Dates active	Max wind km/h (mph)	Pressure (hPa)	Areas affected	Damage (USD)	Deaths	Refs
Roanu	May 17–22	85 (50)	983	Sri Lanka, East coast of India, Bangladesh, Myanmar, Yunnan	$2.03 billion	135	
01W	May 25–27	Unknown	1000	South China	$8.7 million	None	
Bonnie	May 27–June 4	75 (45)	1006	The Bahamas, Southeastern United States	$640,000	2	

=== June ===
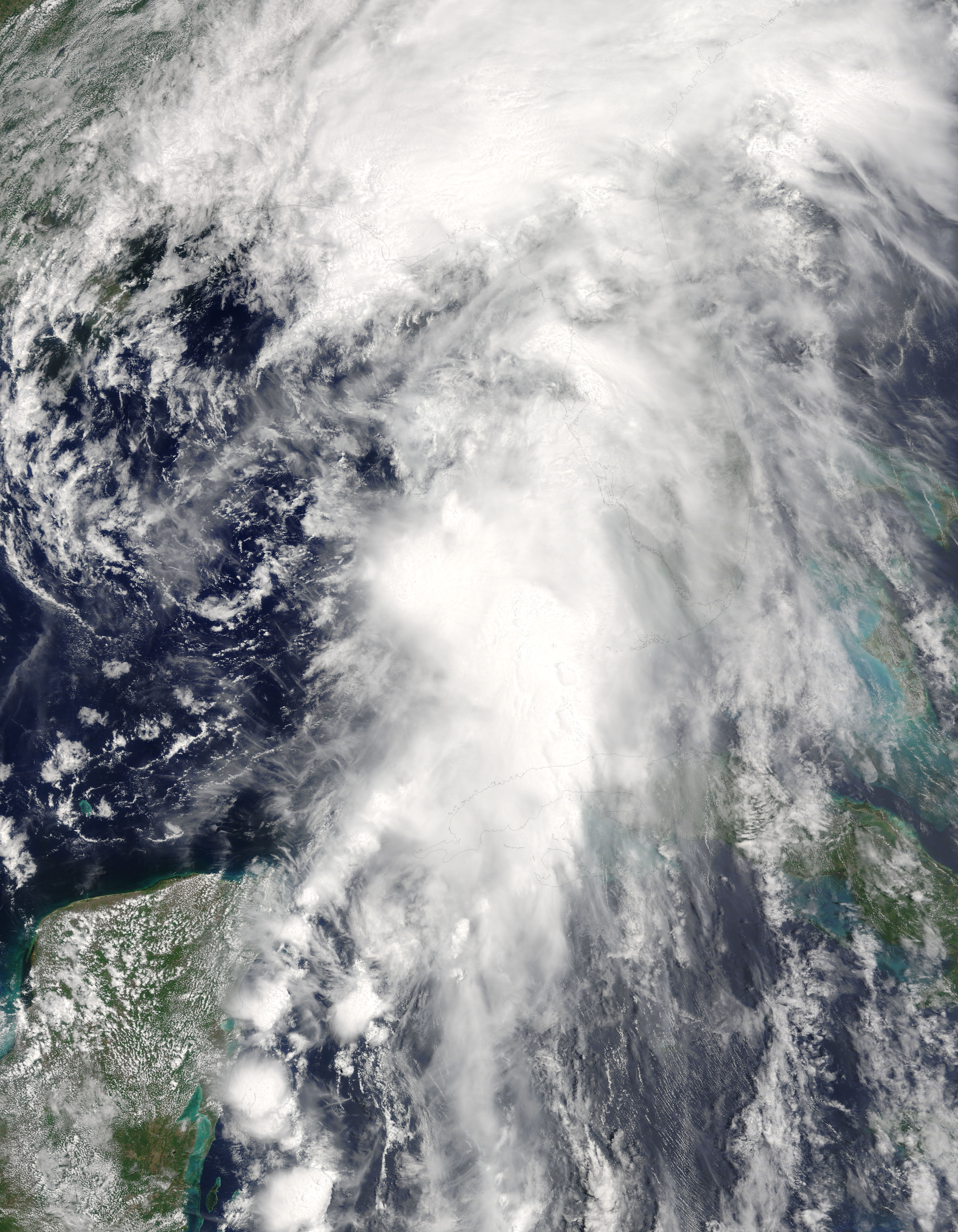
Tropical Storm Colin

Tropical cyclones formed in June 2016
Storm name	Dates active	Max wind km/h (mph)	Pressure (hPa)	Areas affected	Damage (USD)	Deaths	Refs
Colin	June 5–7	85 (50)	1001	Yucatán Peninsula, Cuba, Florida, East Coast of the United States	$1.04 million	6	
One-E	June 6–8	55 (35)	1006	Southwestern Mexico	Minor	None	
Danielle	June 19–21	75 (45)	1007	Yucatán Peninsula, Eastern Mexico	Minimal	1	
TD	June 22–23	55 (35)	1006	Vietnam	Nine	None	
Ambo	June 25–28	55 (35)	1004	Philippines, South China	None	None	
ARB 01	June 27–29	45 (30)	996	Oman, Gujarat	None	None	

=== July ===
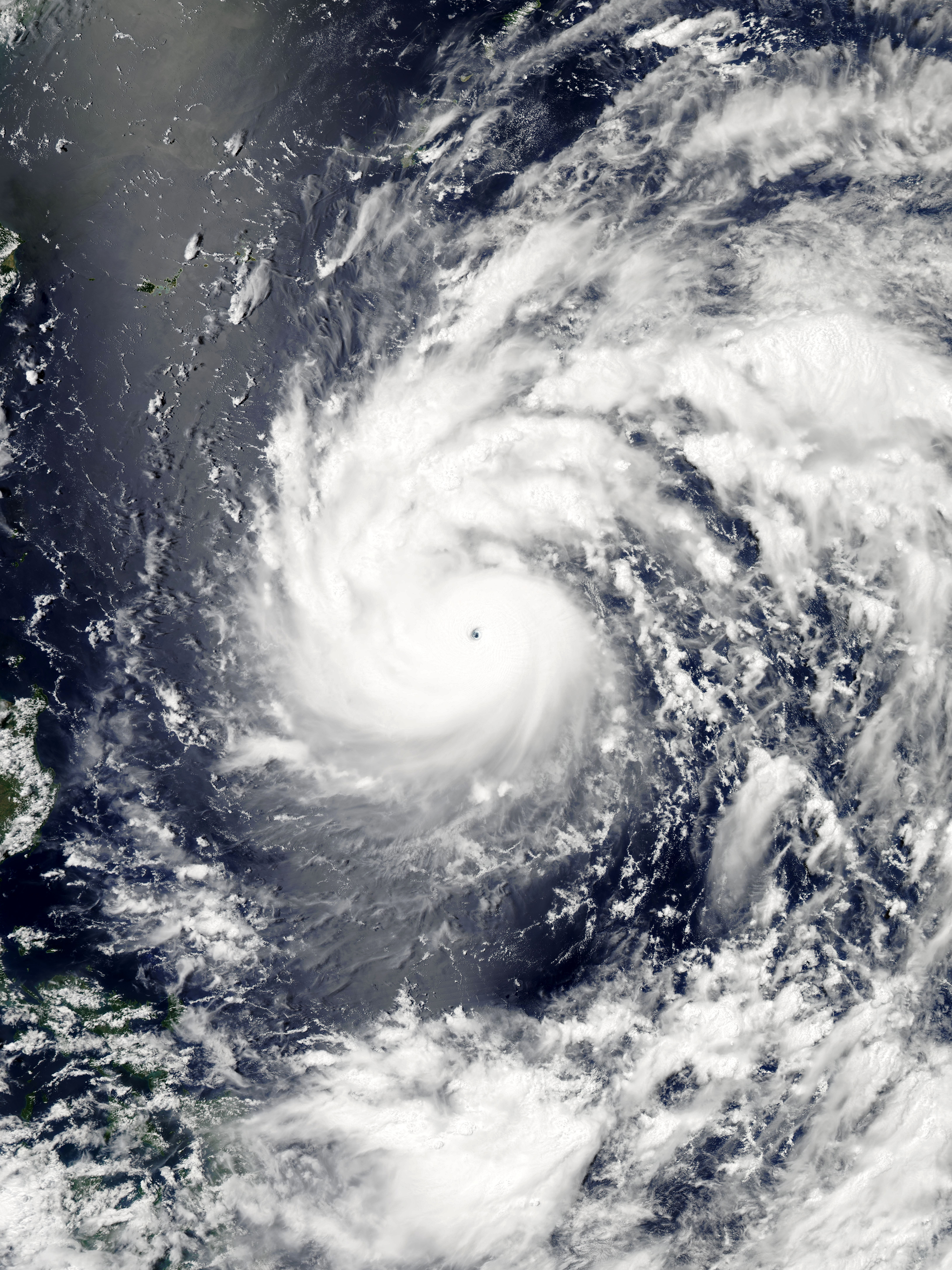
Typhoon Nepartak

Tropical cyclones formed in July 2016
Storm name	Dates active	Max wind km/h (mph)	Pressure (hPa)	Areas affected	Damage (USD)	Deaths	Refs
Nepartak (Butchoy)	July 2–10	205 (125)	900	Philippines, Ryukyu Islands, Taiwan, East China	$1.89 billion	111	
Agatha	July 2–5	85 (50)	1002	None	None	None	
Blas	July 2–10	220 (140)	947	Hawaii	None	None	
Celia	July 6–16	155 (100)	972	Hawaii	None	2	
LAND 01	July 6–7	45 (30)	996	East India	Unknown	None	
Darby	July 11–26	195 (120)	958	Hawaii	Minimal	None	
Estelle	July 15–22	110 (70)	990	None	None	None	
03W	July 15–20	Unknown	1006	Ryukyu Islands	None	None	
Abela	July 15–20	95 (60)	987	Madagascar	None	None	
Frank	July 21–28	140 (85)	979	Baja California Peninsula, Nayarit	None	None	
Georgette	July 21–27	215 (130)	952	Hawaii	None	None	
Lupit	July 22–24	75 (45)	1000	None	None	None	
Mirinae	July 25–28	100 (65)	980	South China, Indochina	$346 million	7	
Nida (Carina)	July 29–August 3	110 (70)	975	Philippines, Taiwan, South China, Vietnam	$316 million	6	
Howard	July 31–August 3	95 (60)	998	Hawaii	None	None	

=== August ===
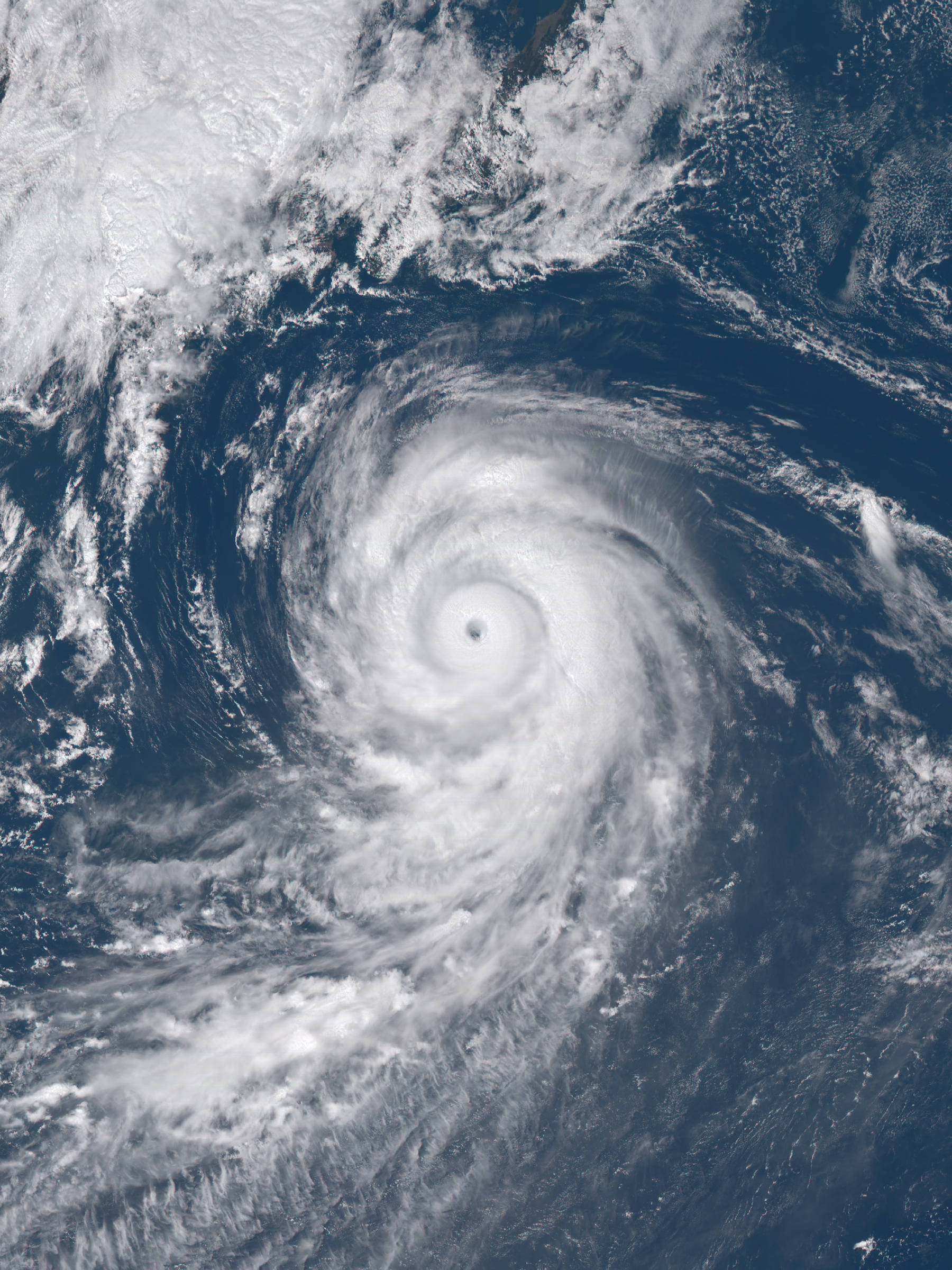
Typhoon Lionrock

August was very active, featuring thirty storms forming, of which fifteen have been named. The month started off on August 2nd with the formation of Hurricane Earl, Tropical Storm Ivette, and Tropical Storm Omais, with Hurricane Earl being the deadliest hurricane to impact Mexico since Hurricane Stan of 2005. Other storms in the Atlantic Basin include Tropical Storm Fiona, Hurricane Gaston, and Hurricane Hermine. Within the Eastern Pacific Ocean, tropical storms Javier and Kay formed alongside Hurricane Lester and Hurricane Madeline. In the Western portion of the Pacific Ocean, seven other storms formed. Tropical Storms Conson, Chanthu, Dianmu, and Kompasu, as well as Typhoons Mindulle, Lionrock, and Namtheun, with Lionrock being the strongest cyclone this month.

Tropical cyclones formed in August 2016
Storm name	Dates active	Max wind km/h (mph)	Pressure (hPa)	Areas affected	Damage (USD)	Deaths	Refs
Earl	August 2–6	140 (85)	979	Lesser Antilles, Puerto Rico, Hispaniola, Jamaica, Cayman Islands, Central America, Mexico	$250 million	94	
Ivette	August 2–8	95 (60)	1000	Hawaii	None	None	
Omais	August 2–9	110 (70)	975	Guam, Japan	None	None	
TD	August 6–9	Unknown	998	Ryukyu Islands, East China	None	None	
Javier	August 7–9	100 (65)	997	Mexico	Minimal	None	
Conson	August 7–15	85 (50)	985	Japan	None	None	
LAND 02	August 9–12	55 (35)	994	Bangladesh, India	Minimal	2	
TD	August 10–13	Unknown	996	Ryukyu Islands, Taiwan, East China	None	None	
TD	August 10–12	Unknown	1010	Midway Atoll	None	None	
Chanthu	August 12–17	100 (65)	980	Japan	$94.7 million	None	
TD	August 12–13	Unknown	1002	Taiwan	None	None	
Dianmu	August 15–20	85 (50)	980	China, Vietnam, Laos, Thailand, Myanmar, Bangladesh, India	$481.1 million	22	
TD	August 15–16	Unknown	996	South China, Vietnam	None	None	
Fiona	August 16–23	85 (50)	1004	Bermuda	None	None	
BOB 02	August 16–20	55 (35)	994	Bangladesh, India	Minimal	6	
Mindulle	August 17–23	120 (75)	975	Mariana Islands, Japan	$448.3 million	3	
Lionrock (Dindo)	August 17–30	220 (140)	940	Japan, Russian Far East, North Korea	$3.84 billion	550	
Kay	August 18–23	85 (50)	1000	Mexico	None	None	
Kompasu	August 18–21	65 (40)	994	Guam, Japan	Minimal	1	
Gaston	August 22–September 2	195 (120)	955	Flores Island	None	None	
TD	August 23–24	Unknown	1000	Philippines	None	None	
14W	August 23–24	55 (35)	1002	Guam	None	None	
TD	August 24	Unknown	1000	None	None	None	
Lester	August 25–September 7	230 (145)	944	Hawaii	Minimal	None	
Madeline	August 26–September 2	215 (130)	950	Hawaii	Minimal	None	
TD	August 27	Unknown	1004	None	None	None	
Eight	August 28–September 1	55 (35)	1010	Cape Hatteras	Minimal	None	
Hermine	August 28–September 8	130 (80)	981	Dominican Republic, Cuba, The Bahamas, Florida, East coast of the United States, Atlantic Canada	$550 million	4 (1)	
TD	August 30–31	Unknown	1004	None	None	None	
Namtheun (Enteng)	August 31–September 5	130 (80)	955	Taiwan, Japan	Minimal	None	

=== September ===
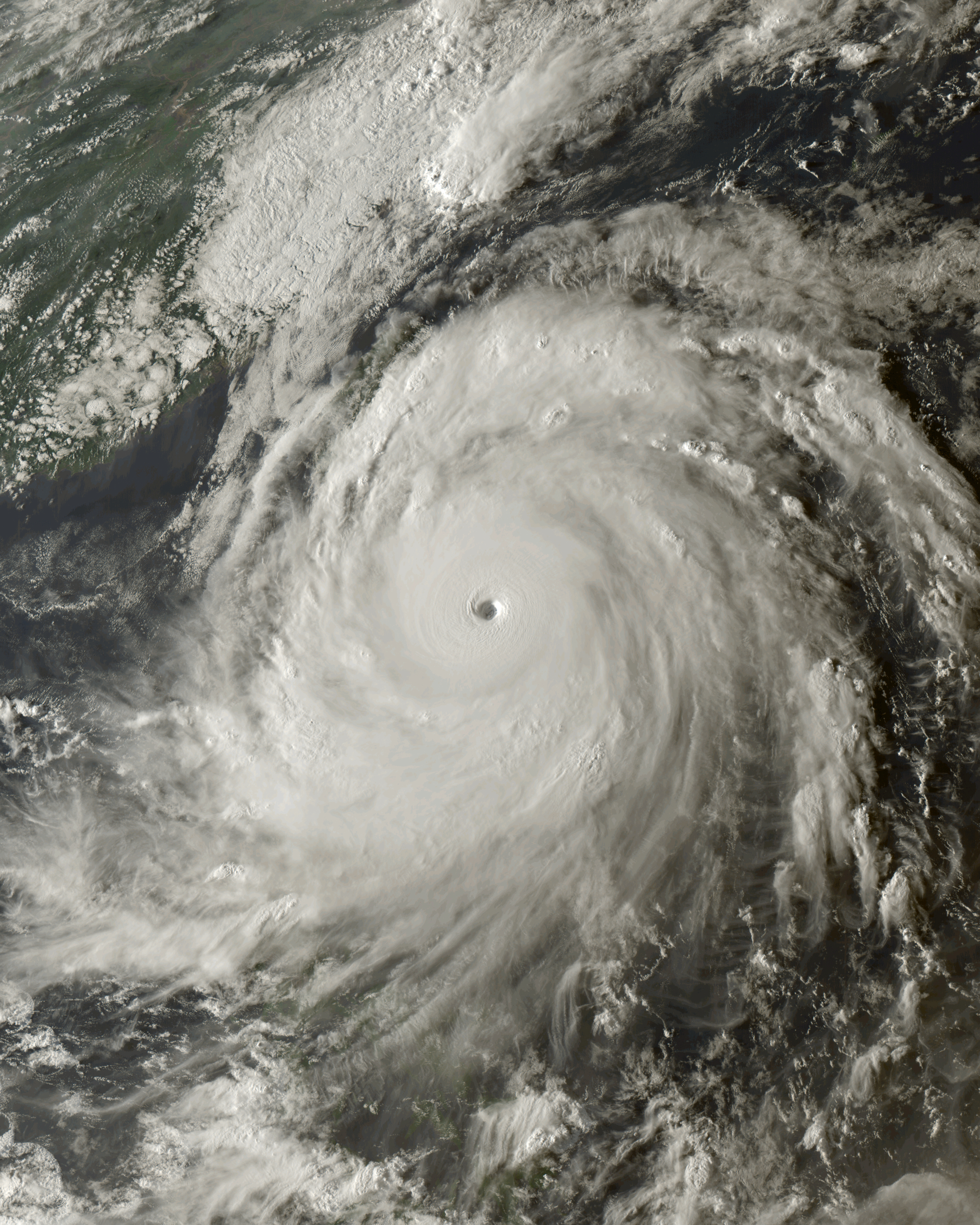
Typhoon Meranti

Tropical cyclones formed in September 2016
Storm name	Dates active	Max wind km/h (mph)	Pressure (hPa)	Areas affected	Damage (USD)	Deaths	Refs
Newton	September 4–7	150 (90)	977	Baja California Peninsula, Northwestern Mexico, Southwestern United States	$95.8 million	9	
Malou	September 5–7	75 (45)	1000	Japan	Minimal	None	
TD	September 7–8	Unknown	998	Japan	None	None	
Meranti (Ferdie)	September 8–16	220 (140)	890	Philippines, Taiwan, Mainland China, South Korea	$4.79 billion	47	
TD	September 9–10	Unknown	1008	None	None	None	
TD	September 10	Unknown	1008	Taiwan	None	None	
17W	September 10–12	65 (40)	1008	None	None	None	
Orlene	September 11–17	175 (110)	967	None	None	None	
Rai	September 11–13	55 (35)	996	Vietnam, Laos, Thailand, Cambodia	$37 million	12	
Malakas (Gener)	September 11–20	175 (110)	930	Mariana Islands, Taiwan, Japan	$300 million	1	
Ian	September 12–16	95 (60)	994	None	None	None	
Julia	September 13–18	85 (50)	1007	The Bahamas, Southeastern United States	$6.13 million	None	
Karl	September 14–25	110 (70)	988	Bermuda	Minimal	None	
Paine	September 18–20	150 (90)	979	Baja California Peninsula	None	None	
Lisa	September 19–25	85 (50)	999	None	None	None	
Megi (Helen)	September 22–29	155 (100)	945	Caroline Islands, Ryukyu Islands, Taiwan, China	$1.56 billion	52	
01U	September 23–29	Unknown	Unknown	None	None	None	
Chaba (Igme)	September 24–October 5	215 (130)	905	Mariana Islands, South Korea, Japan, Russian Far East	$2.61 billion	10	
Roslyn	September 25–29	85 (50)	999	None	None	None	
Ulika	September 26–30	120 (75)	992	None	None	None	
Matthew	September 28–October 9	270 (165)	934	Windward Islands, Leeward Antilles, Venezuela, Colombia, Jamaica, Hispaniola, Puerto Rico, Cuba, Turks and Caicos Islands, The Bahamas, Southeastern United States, Atlantic Canada	$15.09 billion	603	

=== October ===
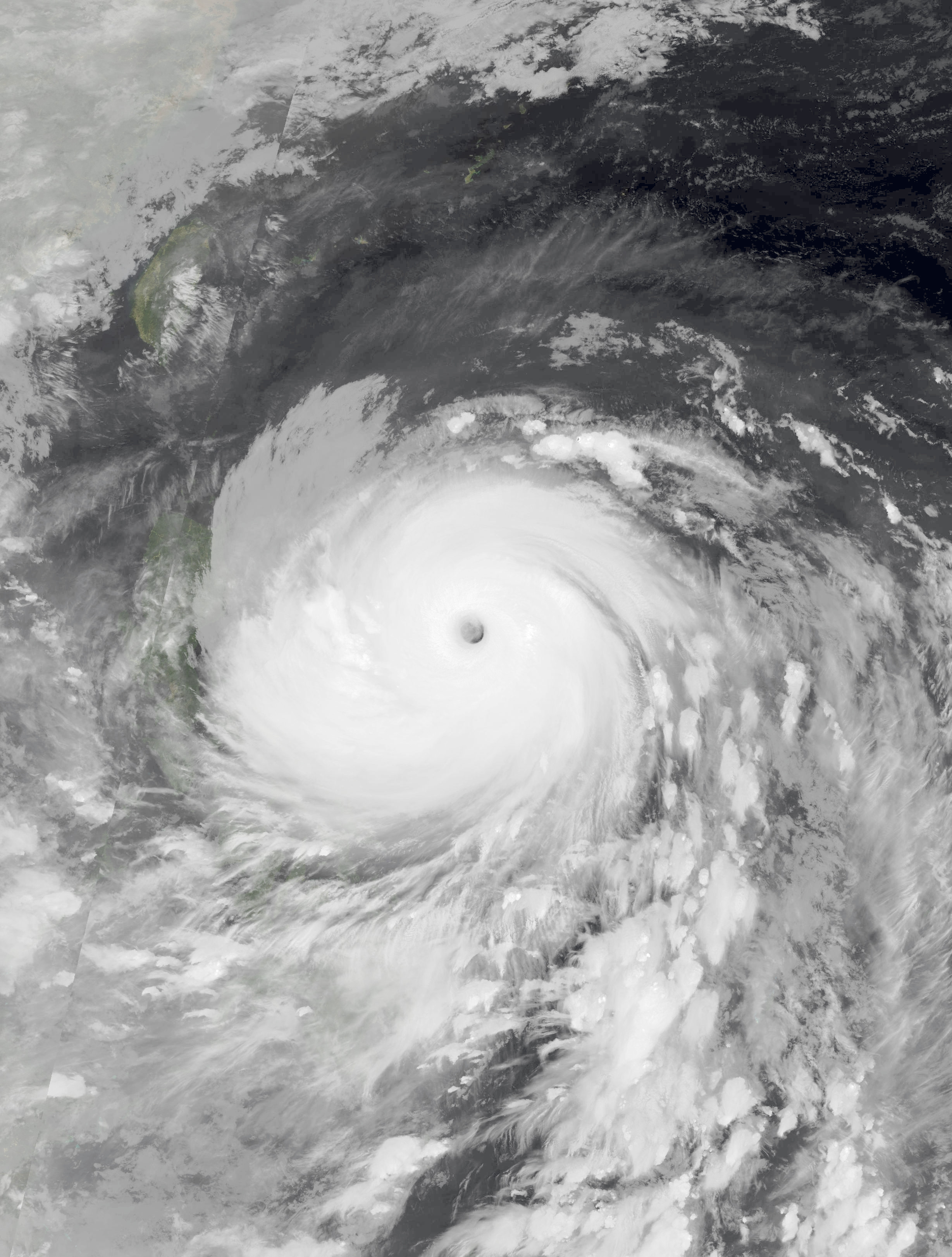
Typhoon Haima

Tropical cyclones formed in October 2016
Storm name	Dates active	Max wind km/h (mph)	Pressure (hPa)	Areas affected	Damage (USD)	Deaths	Refs
Bransby	October 2–6	100 (65)	987	None	None	None	
Songda	October 4–13	185 (115)	925	Pacific Northwest	Unknown	None	
Aere (Julian)	October 4–14	110 (70)	975	Philippines, Taiwan, South China, Indochina	$112 million	35	
Nicole	October 4–18	220 (140)	950	Bermuda	$15 million	1	
02U	October 12–18	Unknown	1004	None	None	None	
Sarika (Karen)	October 13–19	175 (110)	935	Philippines, South China, Vietnam	$866 million	37	
Haima (Lawin)	October 14–21	215 (130)	900	Caroline Islands, Philippines, Taiwan, China, Japan	$972 million	19	
TD	October 15	Unknown	1008	None	None	None	
Kyant	October 21–28	75 (45)	996	Andaman Islands, Myanmar, South India	None	None	
Seymour	October 23–28	240 (150)	940	Baja California	None	None	
Trixi	October 28–31	105 (65)	Unknown	Calabria, Malta, Greece	None	None	
Meari	October 30–November 7	140 (80)	960	Mariana Islands	None	None	
TD	October 31	Unknown	1008	Mariana Islands	None	None	

=== November ===
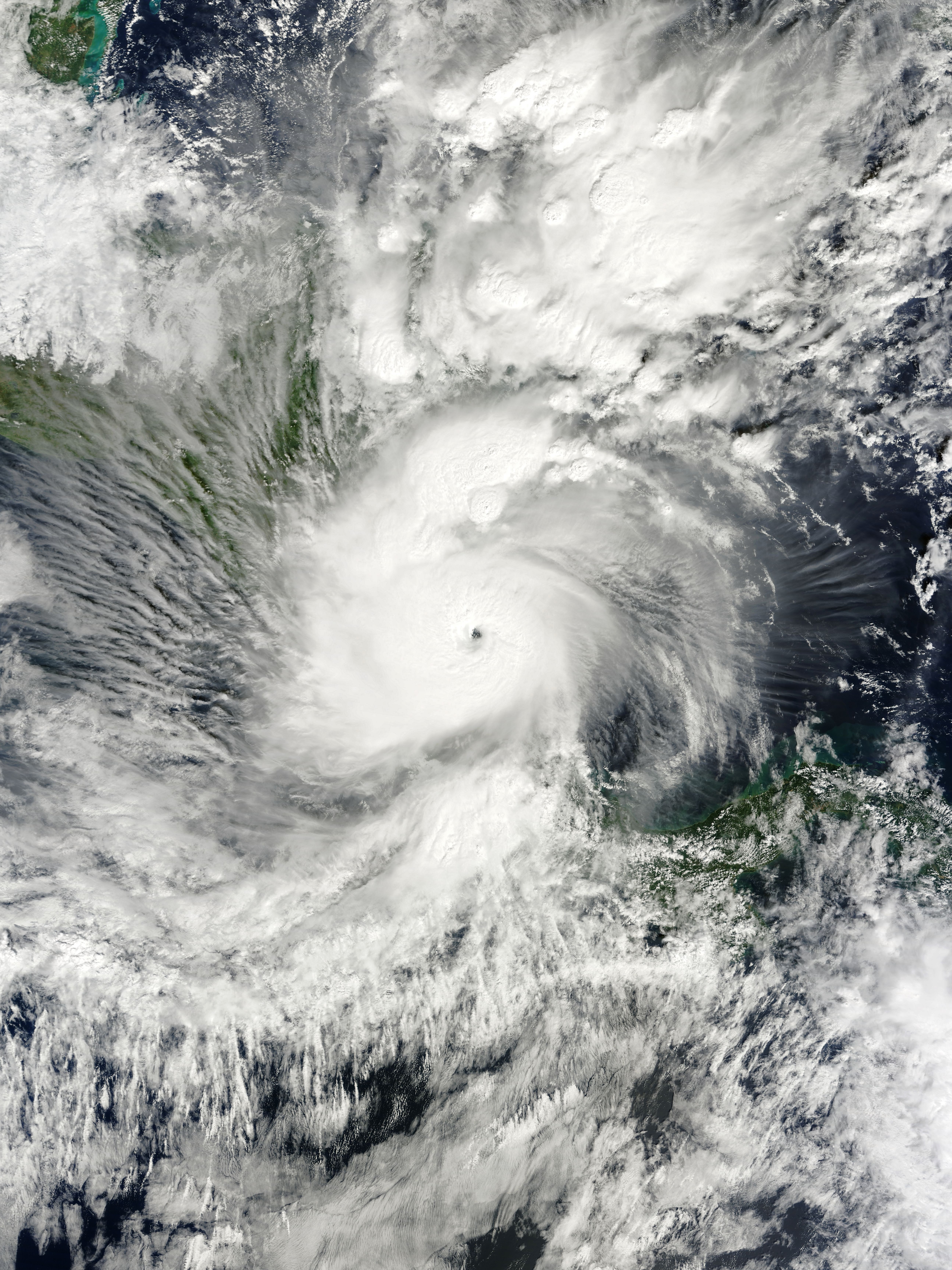
Hurricane Otto

Tropical cyclones formed in November 2016
Storm name	Dates active	Max wind km/h (mph)	Pressure (hPa)	Areas affected	Damage (USD)	Deaths	Refs
TD	November 1–5	55 (35)	998	None	None	None	
TD	November 2–6	55 (35)	1004	Borneo, Indochina	$48.1 million	15	
BOB 04	November 2–6	45 (30)	1000	Malaysia, Thailand, West Bengal, Bangladesh	Unknown	80	
Ma-on	November 8–13	65 (40)	1002	None	None	None	
28W	November 9–12	Unknown	1008	Marshall Islands	None	None	
03U	November 9–15	Unknown	1005	None	None	None	
01F	November 12–13	Unknown	1008	None	None	None	
Tina	November 13–14	65 (40)	1004	Western Mexico	None	None	
Deni	November 15–16	75 (45)	998	Brazil	None	None	
Otto	November 20–26	185 (115)	975	Panama, Costa Rica, Nicaragua, Columbia	≥ $192.2 million	23	
Tokage (Marce)	November 24–28	95 (60)	992	Philippines, Vietnam	$30 thousand	1	
02F	November 23–27	Unknown	1006	None	None	None	
03F	November 27–30	Unknown	1000	Solomon Islands	None	None	
Nada	November 29–December 2	75 (45)	1000	Sri Lanka, South India	Unknown	12	

=== December ===
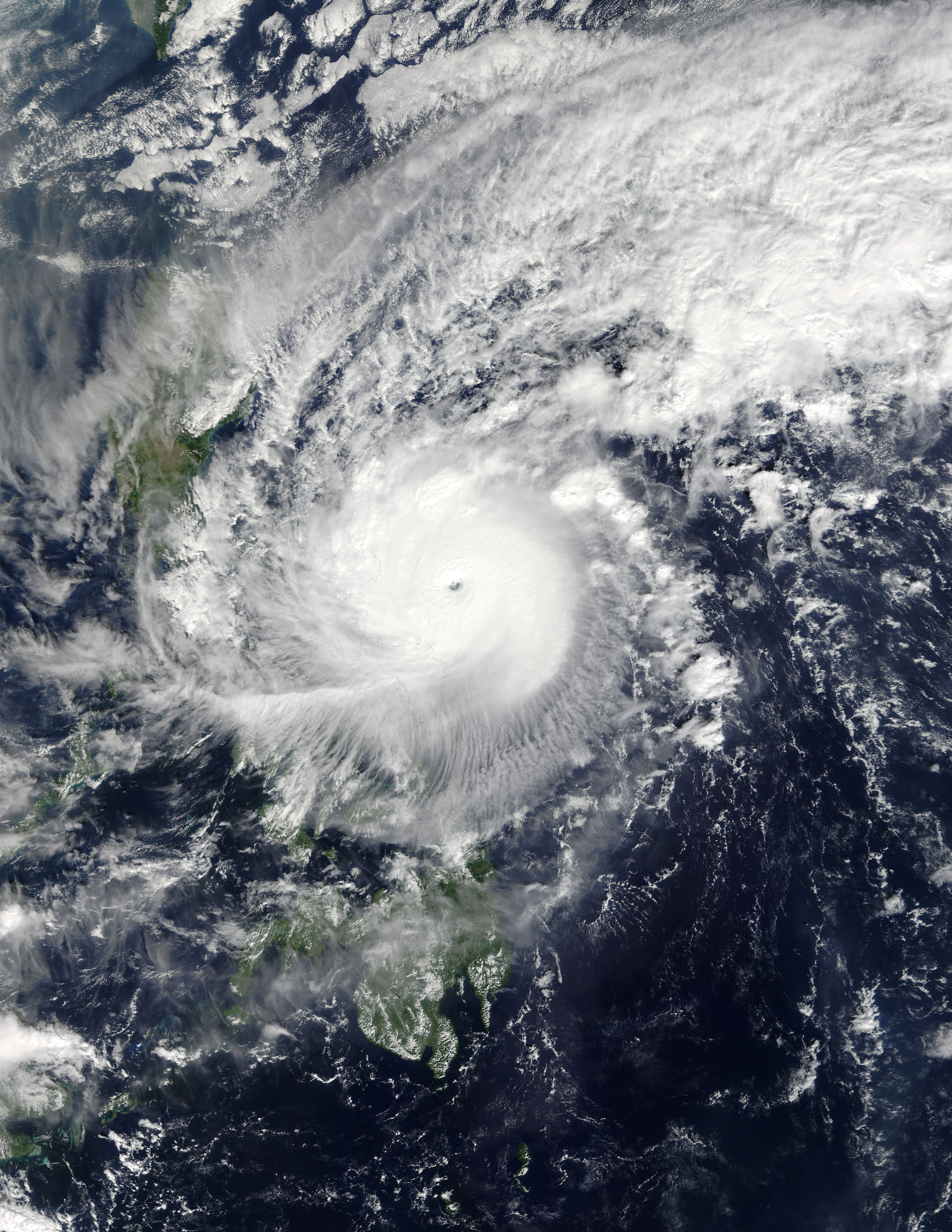
Typhoon Nock-ten

Tropical cyclones formed in December 2016
Storm name	Dates active	Max wind km/h (mph)	Pressure (hPa)	Areas affected	Damage (USD)	Deaths	Refs
04U	December 4–6	Unknown	Unknown	None	None	None	
Eçaí	December 4–6	100 (65)	992	Brazil	None	None	
Vardah/ARB 02	December 6–18	130 (80)	975	Sumatra, Andaman and Nicobar Islands, Thailand, Malaysia, Sri Lanka, Chennai (Tamil Nadu), Somalia	$3.37 billion	47	
05U	December 9–17	Unknown	Unknown	None	None	None	
TD	December 10–13	55 (35)	1004	Vietnam	$53.4 million	30	
04F	December 12–23	45 (30)	998	Fiji	$4.7 million	None	
06U	December 18–23	55 (35)	994	Western Australia	None	None	
Yvette	December 19–25	85 (50)	987	Western Australia	None	None	
Nock-ten (Nina)	December 20–28	195 (120)	915	Caroline Islands, Philippines, Vietnam	$123 million	13	
05F	December 21–26	Unknown	1005	None	None	None	
TD	December 27	Unknown	1004	None	None	None	

== Global effects ==
There are a total of seven tropical cyclone basins that tropical cyclones typically form in this table, data from all these basins are added.

Season name		Areas affected	Systems formed	Named storms	Hurricane-force tropical cyclones	Damage (2016 USD)	Deaths	Ref.
North Atlantic Ocean (Note: The wind speeds for this tropical cyclone/basin are based on the Saffir Simpson Scale which uses 1-minute sustained winds.)		Azores, Lucayan Archipelago, Southeastern United States, Yucatán Peninsula, Greater Antilles, East Coast of the United States, Lesser Antilles, Central America, Atlantic Canada, Cape Verde, South America	16	15	7	$17.485 billion	717 (19)	
Eastern and Central Pacific Ocean		Southwestern Mexico, Hawaii, Baja California Peninsula, Nayarit, Western Mexico, Northwestern Mexico, Southwestern United States	22	21	13	$95.8 million	15	
Western Pacific Ocean (Note: Only systems that formed either before or on December 31, 2016 are counted in the seasonal totals.)		South China, Vietnam, Philippines, Ryukyu Islands, Taiwan, East China, Indochina, Mariana Islands, Japan, Russia, Midway Atoll, Russian Far East, Bangladesh, India, Northeast China, North Korea, South Korea, China, Caroline Islands, Pacific Northwest, Borneo, Marshall Islands,	51	26	17	$16.96 billion	942	
North Indian Ocean (Note: The wind speeds for this tropical cyclone/basin are based on the IMD Scale which uses 3-minute sustained winds.)		Sri Lanka, East India, Bangladesh, Myanmar, Yunnan, Oman, Gujarat, Andaman Islands, South India, Malaysia, Thailand, West Bengal, Sumatra, Nicobar Islands, Chennai, Somalia	9	4	1	$5.51 billion	311	
South-West Indian Ocean	January – June (Note: Only systems that formed either on or after January 1, 2016 are counted in the seasonal totals.) (Note: The wind speeds for this tropical cyclone are based on Météo-France, which uses wind gusts.)	Madagascar, Réunion, Mauritius, Agaléga, Seychelles, Tanzania	5	5	3	$4.5 million	13	
South-West Indian Ocean	July – December	Madagascar	2	1	—N/a	—N/a	—N/a	
Australian region	January – June	Australia, Cocos (Keeling) Islands	5	3	2	Unknown	—N/a	
Australian region	July – December	Solomon Islands, Australia	7	1	—N/a	—N/a	—N/a	
South Pacific Ocean	January – June	Northern Cook Islands, Niue, Tonga, Vanuatu, Fiji, French Polynesia, New Caledonia, Solomon Islands, Wallis and Futuna, Samoan Islands	10	5	4	$1.4 billion	46	
South Pacific Ocean	July – December	Fiji	5	—N/a	—N/a	$4.7 million	—N/a	
South Atlantic tropical cyclone		Brazil	3	2	—N/a	—N/a	—N/a	
Worldwide			135 (Note: The sum of the number of systems in each basin will not equal the number shown as the total. This is because when systems move between basins, it creates a discrepancy in the actual number of systems.)	83	47	$41.45 billion	2,044 (19)	

== See also ==
- Weather of 2016
- Tropical cyclones by year
- List of earthquakes in 2016
- Tornadoes of 2016
