= Tropical Storm Nida (2016) =

Pacific severe tropical storm in 2016

Severe Tropical Storm Nida (Carina)
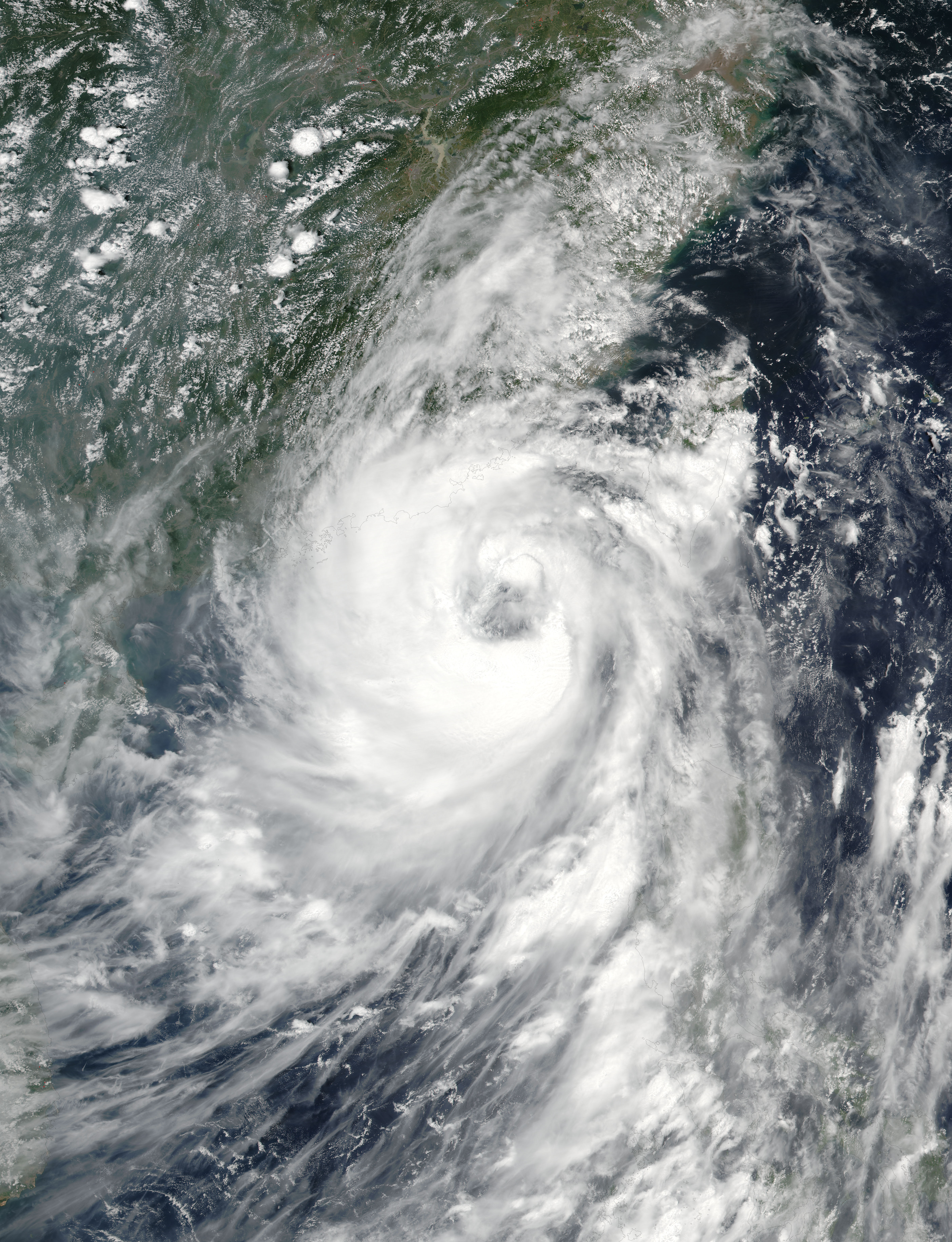
- Nida near peak intensity approaching Guangdong, China on August 1

Meteorological history
- Formed: July 29, 2016
- Dissipated: August 3, 2016

Severe tropical storm
- 10-minute sustained (JMA)
- Highest winds: 110 km/h (70 mph)
- Lowest pressure: 975 hPa (mbar); 28.79 inHg

Category 1-equivalent typhoon
- 1-minute sustained (SSHWS/JTWC)
- Highest winds: 150 km/h (90 mph)
- Lowest pressure: 963 hPa (mbar); 28.44 inHg

Overall effects
- Fatalities: 6 total
- Damage: $316 million
- Areas affected: Philippines, Taiwan, China, Hong Kong, Vietnam
- IBTrACS
- Part of the 2016 Pacific typhoon season

Severe Tropical Storm Nida, (Note: The name Nida (Thai: นิดา, [ni˦˥(ʔ) daː˧]) was contributed by Thailand and is a feminine given name in Thai.) known in the Philippines as Severe Tropical Storm Carina, was a tropical cyclone that struck Luzon, Philippines and Guangdong, China in late July and early August respectively. The fourth named storm of the annual typhoon season, Nida formed on July 28, 2016, as a tropical depression in the Philippine Sea. Tracking generally north-northwestward, it intensified into a severe tropical storm and skirted northern Luzon before turning to the west-northwest, entering the South China Sea and intensifying further. Nida made landfall over Dapeng Peninsula in Shenzhen late on August 1 and dissipated on August 3.

== Meteorological history ==
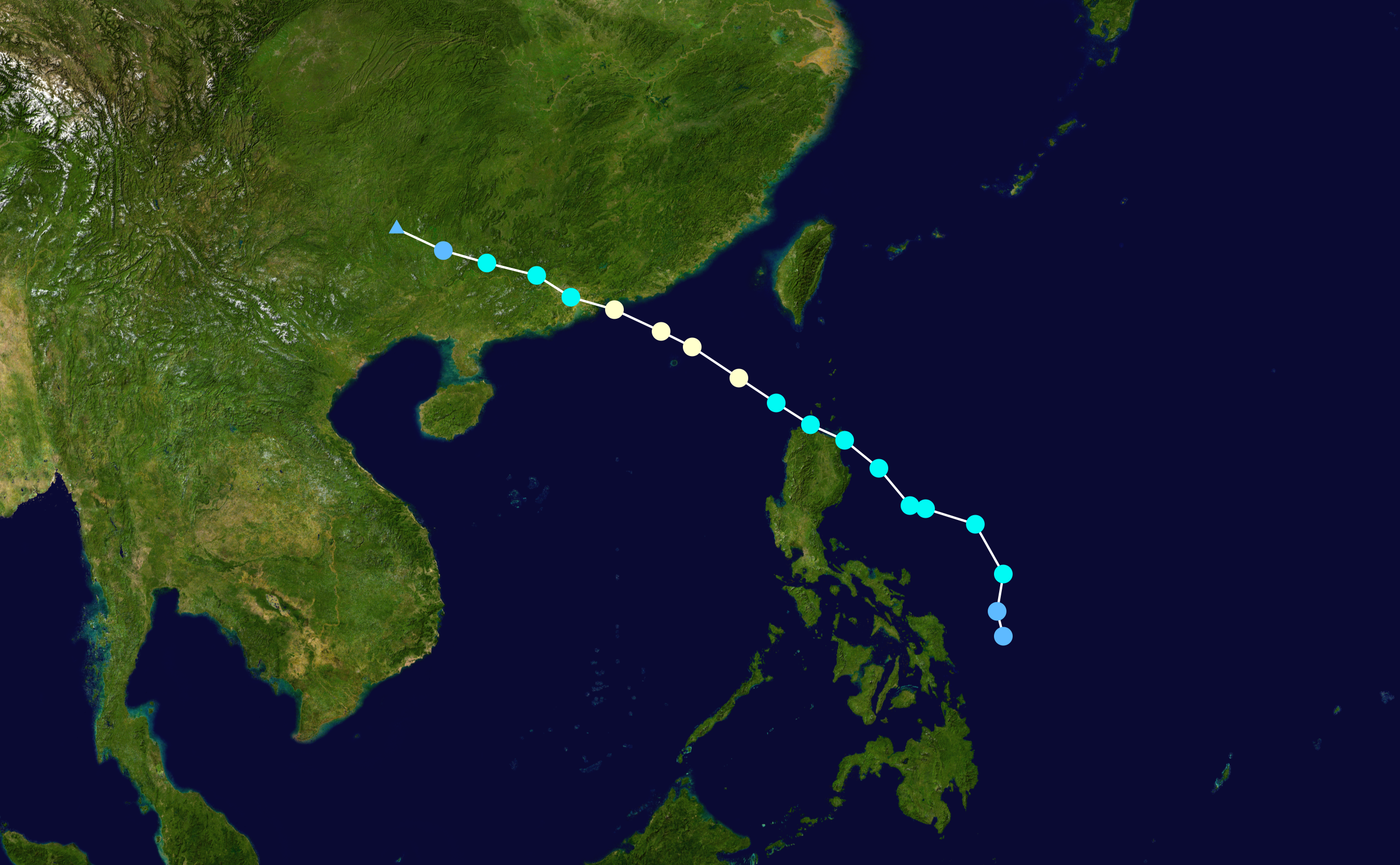
Map plotting the storm's track and intensity, according to the Saffir–Simpson scale Map key Saffir–Simpson scale Tropical depression (≤38 mph, ≤62 km/h) Tropical storm (39–73 mph, 63–118 km/h) Category 1 (74–95 mph, 119–153 km/h) Category 2 (96–110 mph, 154–177 km/h) Category 3 (111–129 mph, 178–208 km/h) Category 4 (130–156 mph, 209–251 km/h) Category 5 (≥157 mph, ≥252 km/h) Unknown Storm type Tropical cyclone Subtropical cyclone Extratropical cyclone, remnant low, tropical disturbance, or monsoon depression

During July 28, the Japan Meteorological Agency started to monitor a tropical depression that had developed about 1,020 km (635 mi) to the east-southeast of Manila in the Philippines. The system had a broad low level circulation center which was consolidating, with atmospheric convection developing to the north and south of the depression. The system was also located within a favorable environment for further development with low vertical wind shear and very warm sea surface temperatures. Over the next day as the system moved north-northwestwards under the influence of a subtropical ridge of high pressure, deep atmospheric convection started wrapping into the system's low level circulation center. The United States Joint Typhoon Warning Center subsequently issued a tropical cyclone formation alert during July 29, as the system rapidly consolidated further, while the global models indicated that tropical cyclogenesis would take place during the next 24 hours. During that day as the system consolidated further, both PAGASA and the JTWC initiated advisories on the system, with the former naming it Carina, while the latter classified it as 06W.

On July 31, Nida made landfall over the area between Baggao and Gattaran of the Cagayan province in the Philippines at 13:20 PST (05:20 UTC) as a severe tropical storm. At 03:35 CST on August 2 (19:35 UTC on August 1), Nida made landfall over Dapeng Peninsula of Shenzhen, Guangdong, China as a severe tropical storm.

In post-analysis, the JMA downgraded Nida's peak intensity to a severe tropical storm with winds of 110 km/h.

== Preparations and impact ==
=== Philippines ===
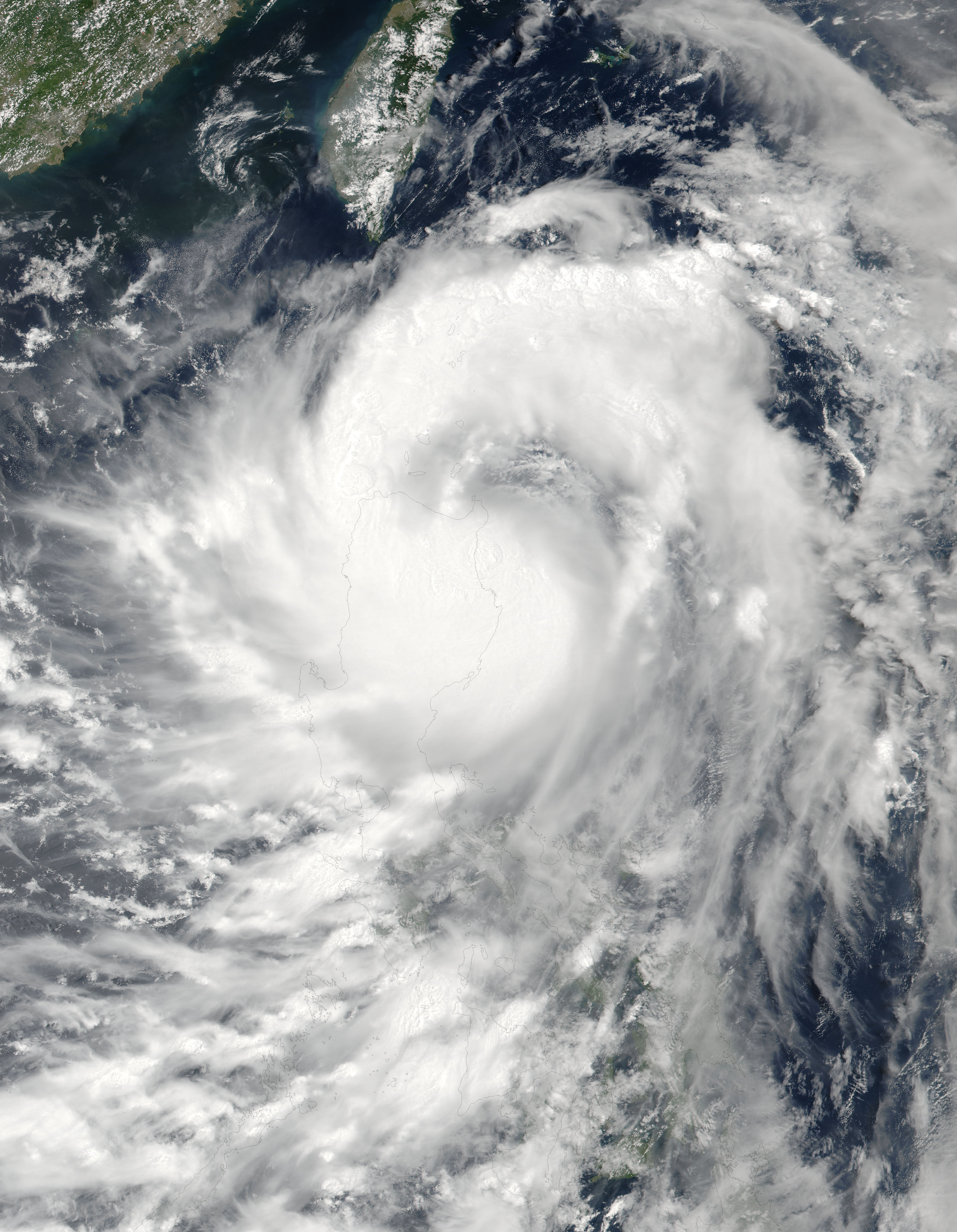
Severe Tropical Storm Nida over Luzon, Philippines on July 31

Before tropical storm Nida (known as Carina in the Philippines) made its landfall through Cagayan province, PAGASA raised a public signal warning number 2 throughout the Cordillera Administrative Region. While it lashes the Northeastern part of the Philippines, the provinces of Isabela, Cagayan, Quirino Province, Abra, Mt. Province, Benguet, Kalinga Province, and Ifugao Province reported that some of their major roads was not passable due to landslides. Despite the local governments of the said areas reported that there are no casualties, they still reported that some of them are injured during the typhoon. Damages in Ilocos Norte were estimated at ₱19.38 million (US$411,000).

=== Mainland China ===
The typhoon impacted five provinces across southern China (Guangdong, Guangxi, Guizhou, Hunan, and Yunnan), affecting 495,000 people. Of those affected, 37,000 required evacuation and 2,100 needed emergency assistance. Approximately 300 homes and 2,700 hectares (6,700 acres) of crops were destroyed while another 2,400 homes and 16,900 hectares (42,000 acres) of crops were damaged. 2 people were killed in mainland China, and total economic losses were counted to be ¥1.14 billion (US$172 million).

=== Hong Kong ===
The typhoon led to the cancellation of over 180 flights at the Hong Kong International Airport. Gale to storm force winds of up to 100 kilometres per hour downed numerous trees during the passage of the eyewall. Although the city was hit directly by the typhoon, the highest tropical cyclone warning signals were not necessary as the wind strength did not justify the issuing of higher signals, due to Nida weakening after landfall. However, the No. 8 tropical cyclone signal was kept in force for 16 hours.

=== Vietnam ===
A suspension bridge in Bát Xát district was washed away, leaving 16 households isolated. The storm also destroyed 17 homes in the country and damaged substantial areas of crops. Internet services in Vietnam were also slowed down after a submarine cable was cut during the storm. Nida killed 4 people in Northern Vietnam and left 7 others missing. Total economic losses in Vietnam were counted to be US$144 million.

== See also ==
- Weather of 2016
- Tropical cyclones in 2016
- Typhoon Nuri (2008)
- Tropical Storm Linfa (2015)
- Tropical Storm Pakhar (2017)
- Tropical Storm Ma-on (2022)
- Tropical Storm Talim (2023)
- Tropical Storm Wipha (2025)
