= November 2016 Vietnam tropical depression =

Storm

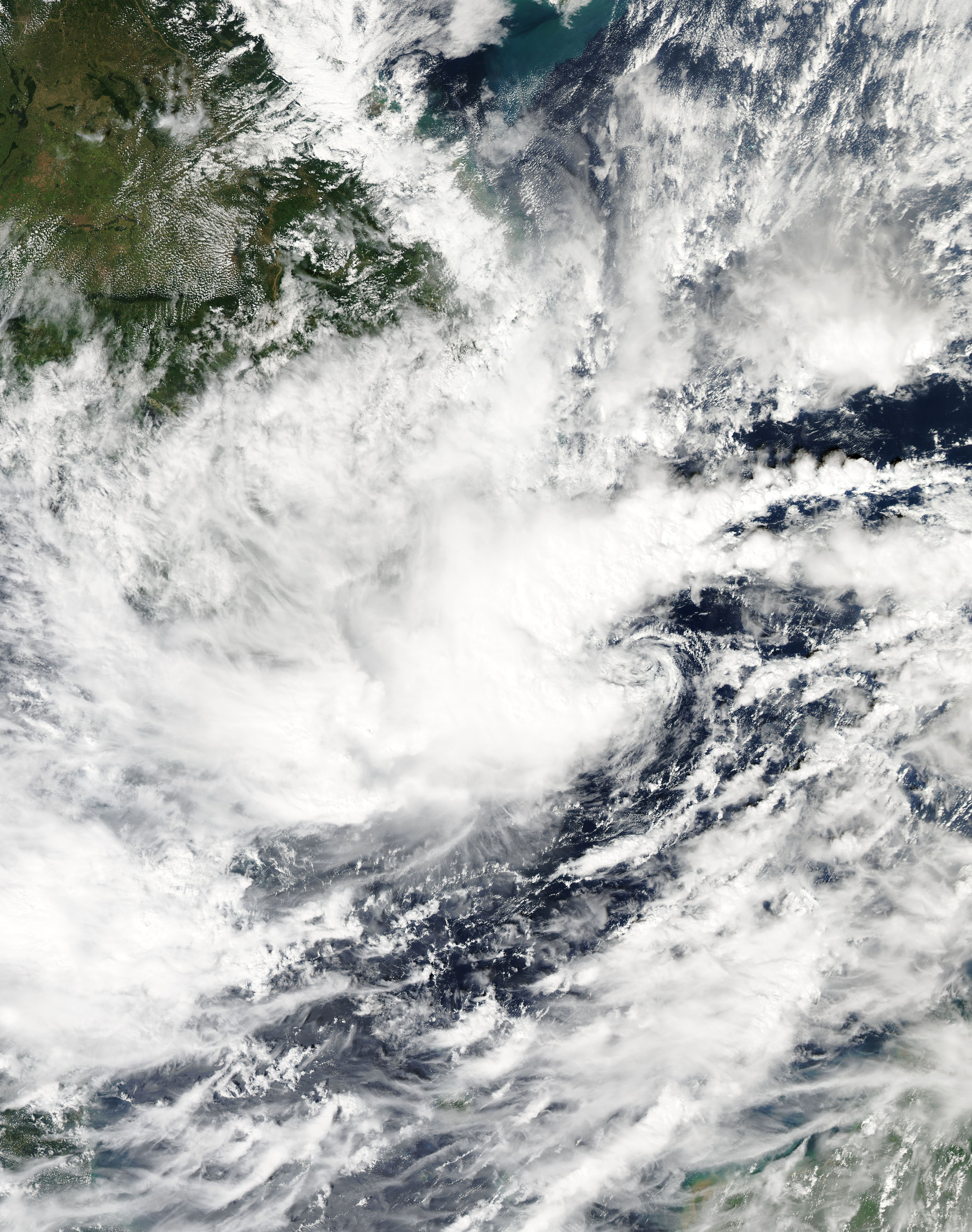
- The tropical depression near the southern coast of Vietnam on November 4

Meteorological history
- Formed: November 3, 2016
- Dissipated: November 6, 2016

Tropical depression
- 10-minute sustained (JMA)
- Highest winds: 55 km/h (35 mph)
- Lowest pressure: 1004 hPa (mbar); 29.65 inHg

Overall effects
- Fatalities: 15 confirmed, 6 missing
- Damage: $48.1 million (2016 USD)
- Areas affected: Vietnam, Cambodia, Thailand
- Part of the 2016 Pacific typhoon season

The November 2016 Vietnam tropical depression caused heavy flooding throughout central and southern Vietnam. Forming out from a low-pressure system on November 3, the Japan Meteorological Agency (JMA) began monitoring it as a tropical depression. With favorable conditions aloft and an increase of organization, the JMA predicted that it had a chance of becoming a tropical storm while the Joint Typhoon Warning Center (JTWC) in the same time issued a Tropical Cyclone Formation Alert on November 4. Due to its proximity to land and a circulation displaced from the deep convection, both the JMA and the JTWC canceled their warnings as it made landfall over in Southern Vietnam. The system continued moving westward over land and the JMA stopped tracking on the system on November 6.

Although the system did not reach tropical storm intensity, the system helped worsen the effects from the flooding that occurred during mid October. Reports after the storm had stated that a total of 15 people were dead while 6 are still missing. Large areas of cropland were inundated by the waters and numerous homes were damaged. Damages from the system were estimated at ₫1.073 trillion ($48.1 million USD). Some say that Vietnam had its worst flooding since 2011.

== Meteorological history ==
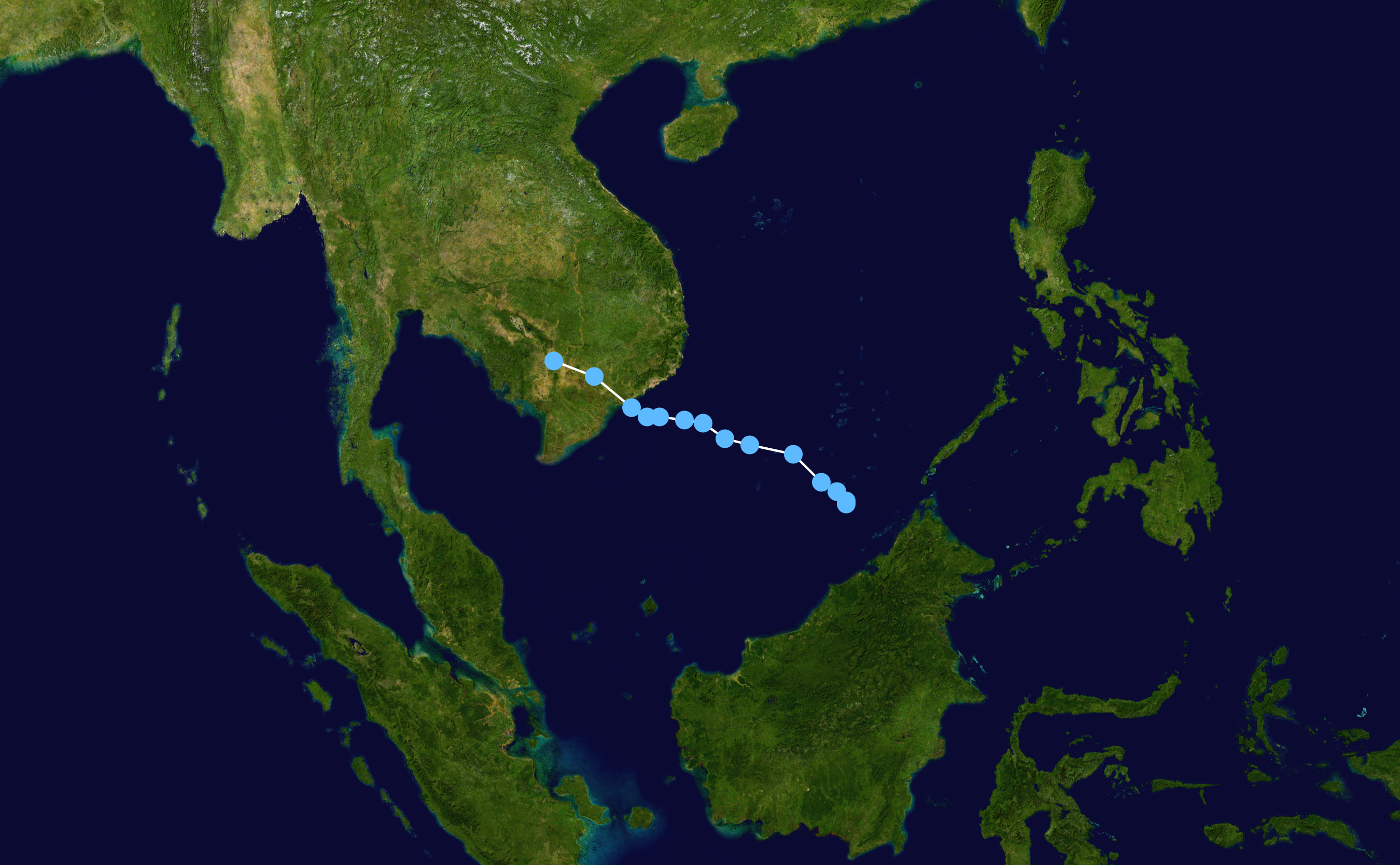
Map plotting the storm's track and intensity, according to the Saffir–Simpson scale Map key Saffir–Simpson scale Tropical depression (≤38 mph, ≤62 km/h) Tropical storm (39–73 mph, 63–118 km/h) Category 1 (74–95 mph, 119–153 km/h) Category 2 (96–110 mph, 154–177 km/h) Category 3 (111–129 mph, 178–208 km/h) Category 4 (130–156 mph, 209–251 km/h) Category 5 (≥157 mph, ≥252 km/h) Unknown Storm type Tropical cyclone Subtropical cyclone Extratropical cyclone, remnant low, tropical disturbance, or monsoon depression

On November 3, the JMA started to track a tropical depression with winds of 55 km/h (35 mph) that had just formed as an area of low pressure off the coast of Malaysia. By November 4, the JTWC started to track the disturbance, as it was located about 343 km (185 nmi) east of Ho Chi Minh City, since the system had a rapidly consolidating center with flaring convection. At that time, the depression was located in an area of low to moderate wind shear, very warm sea-surface temperatures and good divergence aloft.

Later that day, the JMA had analysed that the tropical depression had reached its maximum intensity with a minimum barometric pressure of 1004 hPa (29.65 inHg). Just before November 5, the JTWC issued a Tropical Cyclone Formation Alert (TCFA), while located atop of warm waters with temperatures of approximately 29 °C (84.2 °F). However, the next day, the JTWC cancelled their alert, as the system was weakening and nearing land, while increasing wind shear did not favor development. The depression made landfall over in Bình Thuận and Bà Rịa-Vũng Tàu in Southern Vietnam and continued moving westwards. The JMA stopped monitoring on the system over land early on November 6.

== Impact ==
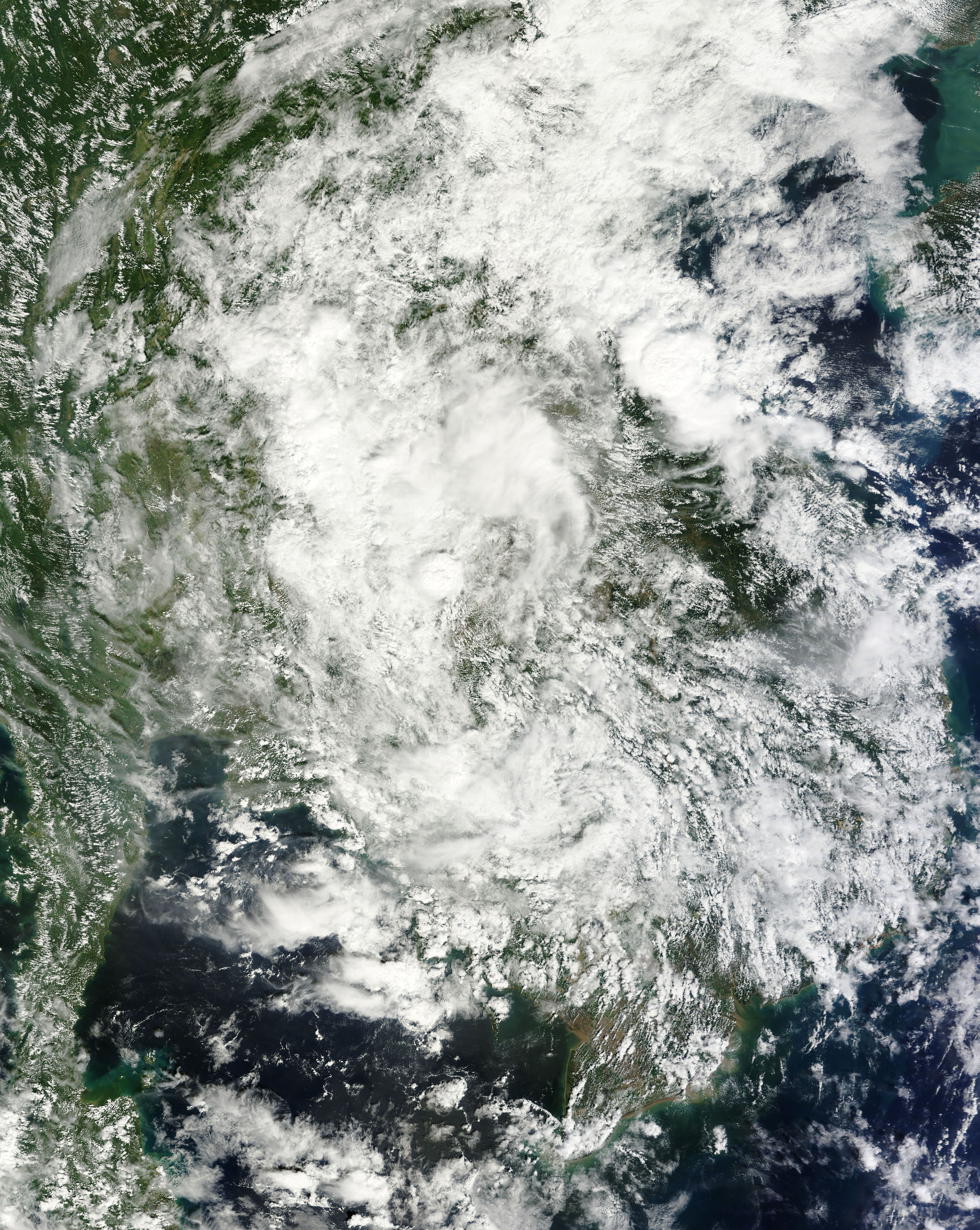
Satellite image of Mainland Southeast Asia and the remnants of the tropical depression on November 7

The flooding, escalated by the depression, started to occurred as early as October when the remnants of Tropical Storm Aere and Typhoon Sarika affected most of Vietnam. During October 15, it was reported that the low pressure triggered heavy rain with accumulations of about 300–900 mm (1–3 ft) recorded in coastal provinces with nine casualties. About 27,000 homes were flooded within the region. As of October 16, 11 people have been killed, with seven of them from Quảng Bình Province.

Almost immediately after formation, the depression, combined with the Northeast Monsoon, brought additional flooding to much of the nation. It was stated that the flooding at that time was caused by the system and cold air combined. A total of 42,100 houses were destroyed while 40,000 other dwellings in 12 provinces were inundated. Moreover, 12,000 hectares of crop were damaged; 40,000 cattle and poultry drowned. On November 3, two people were missing while seven people were injured in Quảng Bình. The provinces of Hà Tĩnh, Quảng Bình and Quảng Trị alone had a total of 20,000 homes submerged underwater. About 485 families were therefore been evacuated in low-lying areas. Moreover, officials at six hydroelectric dams in those areas started discharging water to avoid dam breaches. Reportedly, Phú Yên Province had the most damage of ₫337 billion (US$15.1 million). Floods, at that time, had washed away 250,000 cubic meters of soil on roads, while also damaging 15 bridges. Road damages were reported to be at ₫498 billion (US$22.3 million). The province of Phú Yên had also called for emergency aid of 1,000 tonnes of rice and over 1 tonne of medicines and medical supplies.

After a week, Khánh Hòa Province have asked the government officials to provide ₫226 billion (US$10.1 million) in recovery funds while Phú Yên Province have requested ₫105 billion (US$4.71 million) for road repairs. As of November 9, a total of 15 people have been killed from the flooding since the beginning of November with total damages up to ₫1.073 trillion (US$48.1 million). In all, 50 people had died from both the depression and prior flooding in mid-October.

== See also ==
- Weather of 2016
- Tropical cyclones in 2016
- September 2009 Vietnam tropical depression
- Tropical Depression 18W (2013)
- Tropical Storm Rai (2016)
- Tropical Storm Toraji (2018)
