= Tropical Storm Rai (2016) =

Pacific tropical storm in 2016

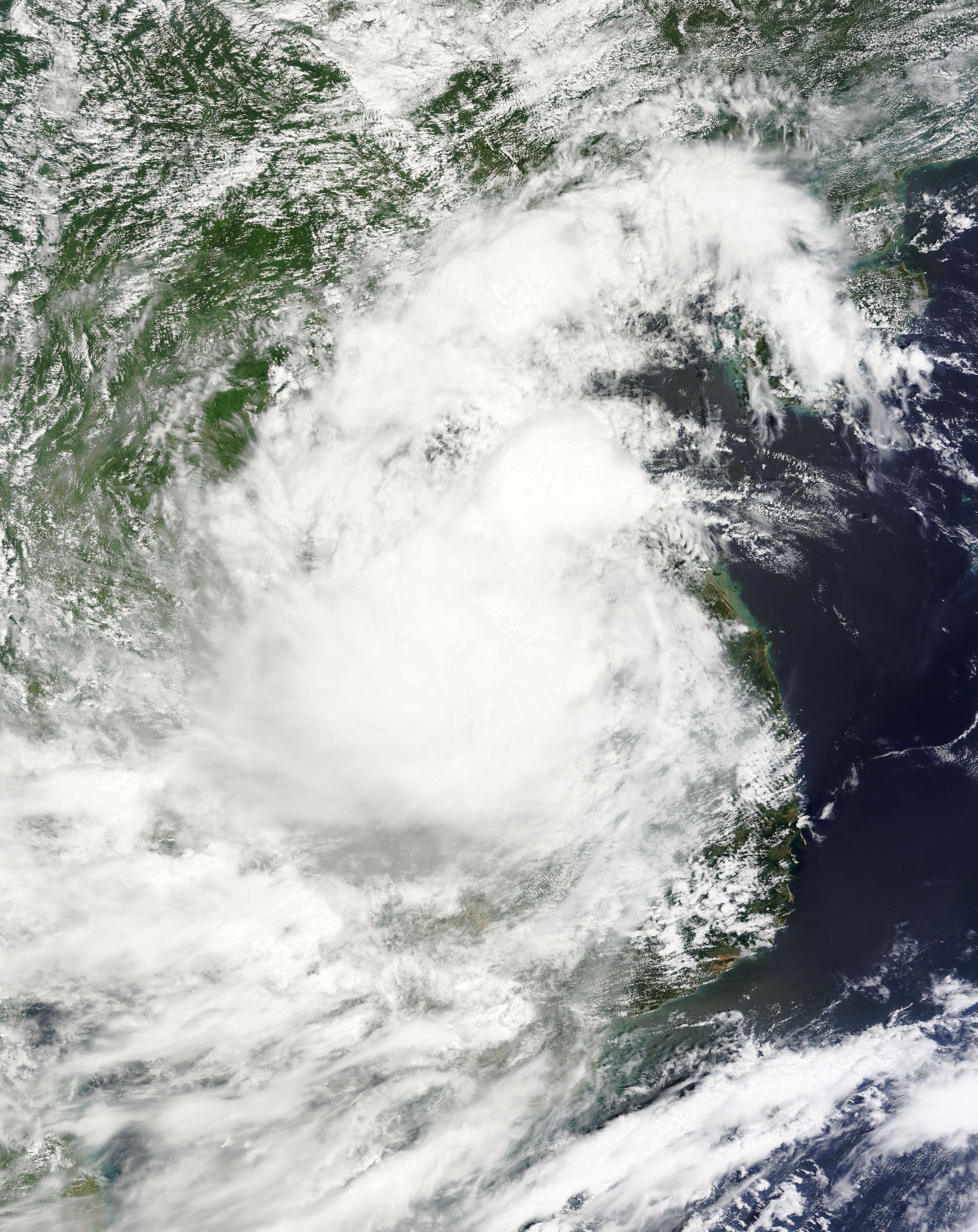
- Tropical Storm Rai over Vietnam on September 13

Meteorological history
- Formed: September 11, 2016
- Dissipated: September 13, 2016

Tropical storm
- 10-minute sustained (JMA)
- Highest winds: 65 km/h (40 mph)
- Lowest pressure: 996 hPa (mbar); 29.41 inHg

Tropical depression
- 1-minute sustained (SSHWS/JTWC)
- Highest winds: 55 km/h (35 mph)
- Lowest pressure: 1000 hPa (mbar); 29.53 inHg

Overall effects
- Fatalities: 14 total
- Damage: $74 million
- Areas affected: Vietnam, Laos, Thailand, Cambodia
- IBTrACS
- Part of the 2016 Pacific typhoon season

Tropical Storm Rai (Note: The name Rai (Yapese: raay, [ɽ͡rɑːj]) was contributed by the Federated States of Micronesia and refers to rai stones, large donut-shaped stone relics used as ceremonial gifts, in Yapese.) was a weak and short-lived tropical cyclone which affected Indochina in mid September 2016. Formed from a tropical disturbance on September 11, the system developed into a tropical storm (on the JTWC scale) and reached its peak intensity on September 12, before making landfall in Vietnam and affecting Laos, Thailand and Cambodia. In Vietnam total damage reached US$73.96 million.

== Meteorological history ==
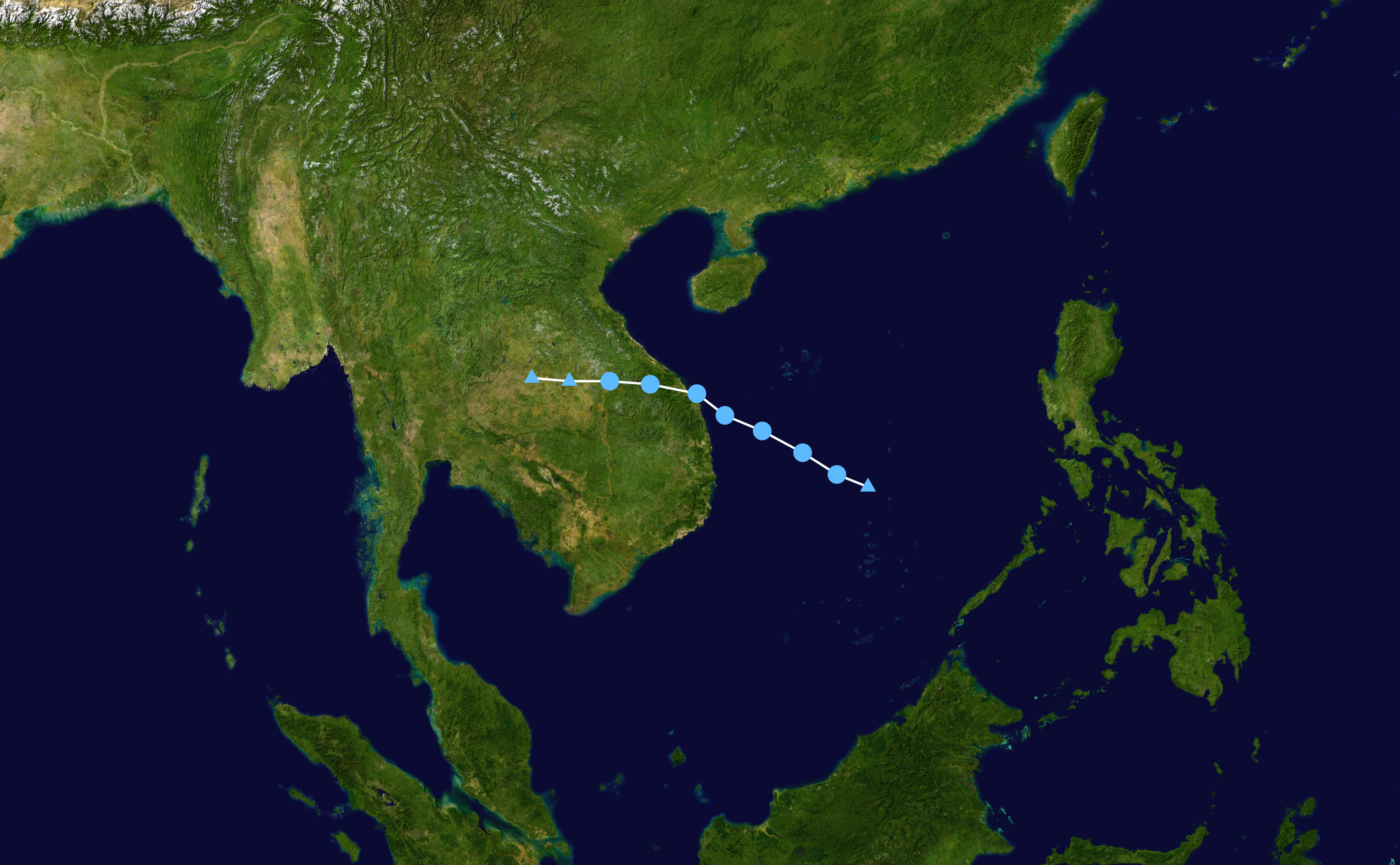
Map plotting the storm's track and intensity, according to the Saffir–Simpson scale Map key Saffir–Simpson scale Tropical depression (≤38 mph, ≤62 km/h) Tropical storm (39–73 mph, 63–118 km/h) Category 1 (74–95 mph, 119–153 km/h) Category 2 (96–110 mph, 154–177 km/h) Category 3 (111–129 mph, 178–208 km/h) Category 4 (130–156 mph, 209–251 km/h) Category 5 (≥157 mph, ≥252 km/h) Unknown Storm type Tropical cyclone Subtropical cyclone Extratropical cyclone, remnant low, tropical disturbance, or monsoon depression

During September 11, the Japan Meteorological Agency started to monitor a tropical depression, that had developed within an unfavourable environment for further development, about 860 km (535 mi) to the northeast of Ho Chi Minh City, Vietnam. The system had a broad low level circulation centre, with unorganized deep convection located along the southern edge of the system. During that day the system gradually developed further, before the Joint Typhoon Warning centre initiated advisories and classified it as Tropical depression 19W during the next day.

By the next day, the JTWC upgraded the system to a tropical depression with the given designation of 19W. Satellite then showed that the LLCC of 19W was broad and defined with some deep convective banding. However, its LLCC became exposed, though its deep convection remained in place. Hours later, the JMA had declared that 19W had strengthened into a tropical storm, with the name Rai. Although it has strengthened, the JTWC issued its final advisory without upgrading it to a tropical storm, whilst Rai made landfall over Central Vietnam, about 94 km (59 mi) southeast of the city of Da Nang. According to the JMA, Rai reached its maximum intensity only as a weak tropical storm over land, however they issued their last advisory and was downgraded into a tropical depression six hours later. The JMA tracked the system until early on September 14 when it was near the 100th meridian east.

== Preparations and impact ==
On late September 12, Tropical Storm Rai, known in Vietnam as Cơn bão số 4 (the 4th storm in 2016), made landfall in Quảng Nam Province and Quảng Ngãi Province in Central Vietnam. The storm killed 14 people in Vietnam. Heavy rains in Central Vietnam caused flooding and the bursting of the Bung River 2 hydroelectricity plant in Quảng Nam province of Vietnam, which released 28 million cubic meters of water and washed away 2 workers. Damage from the bursting was ₫5 billion (US$224,000). Four ships were sunk along central Vietnam's coastline and 2 others were left stranded, while 5 houses were completely destroyed and the roofs of 275 others were torn off. Total damages caused by Rai amounted to ₫1,649 billion (US$73.96 million).

On September 13, the Thai Meteorological Department issued a warning to people in 34 provinces in the North, Northeast and East to brace for heavy rain and stay tuned for weather updates, when Tropical Storm Rai moved through Laos and Thailand.

== See also ==
- Weather of 2016
- Tropical cyclones in 2016
- Other storms of the same name
- Tropical Depression 18W (2013)
- Tropical Storm Vamco (2015)
- Tropical Storm Aere (2016)
- November 2016 Vietnam tropical depression
