= Tropical Storm Vamco (2015) =

Pacific tropical storm in 2015

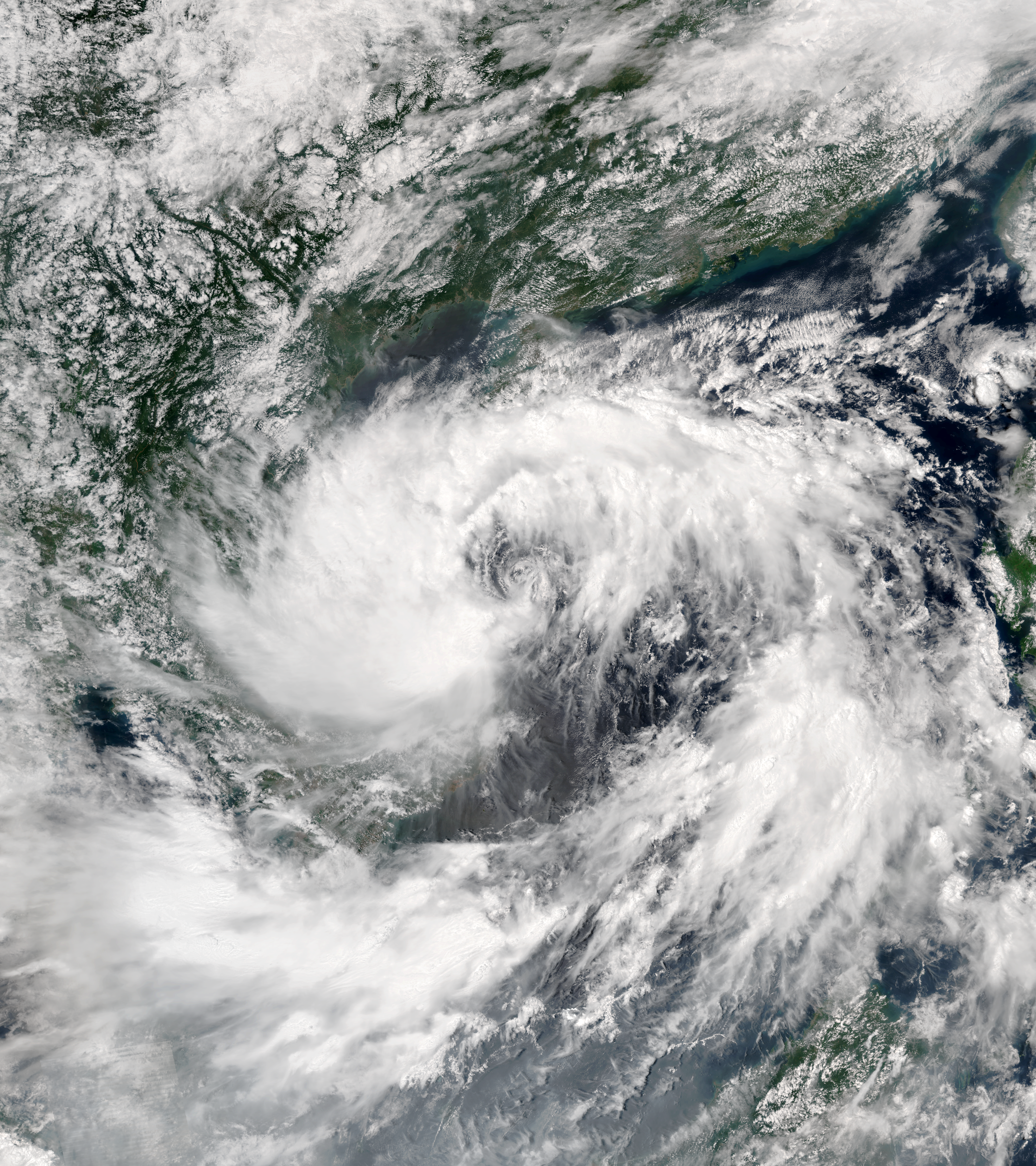
- Tropical Storm Vamco at peak intensity while approaching Vietnam on September 14

Meteorological history
- Formed: September 13, 2015
- Dissipated: September 15, 2015

Tropical storm
- 10-minute sustained (JMA)
- Highest winds: 65 km/h (40 mph)
- Lowest pressure: 998 hPa (mbar); 29.47 inHg

Tropical storm
- 1-minute sustained (SSHWS/JTWC)
- Highest winds: 65 km/h (40 mph)
- Lowest pressure: 996 hPa (mbar); 29.41 inHg

Overall effects
- Fatalities: 15 total
- Damage: $14.1 million (2015 USD)
- Areas affected: South China, Vietnam, Laos, Cambodia, Thailand
- IBTrACS
- Part of the 2015 Pacific typhoon season

Tropical Storm Vamco (Note: The name Vamco (Vietnamese: Vàm Cỏ, [vaːm˨˩ kɔ˧˩]) was contributed by Vietnam and refers to the Vàm Cỏ River in southern Vietnam.) was a weak tropical cyclone which affected Indochina in mid-September 2015. Formed from a tropical disturbance on September 13, the system developed into a tropical storm and reached its peak intensity on September 14. Vamco made landfall in Vietnam and affected Laos, Thailand and Cambodia. The storm caused flooding in these countries and damages amounted to US$14.1 million. Fifteen people died in the floods.

In Vietnam, Vamco was known as Cơn bão số 3 năm 2015 (3rd storm in 2015). Heavy rains caused by the storm in Central Vietnam ended the drought in this area, after many hot days because of the strong El Niño.

== Meteorological history ==
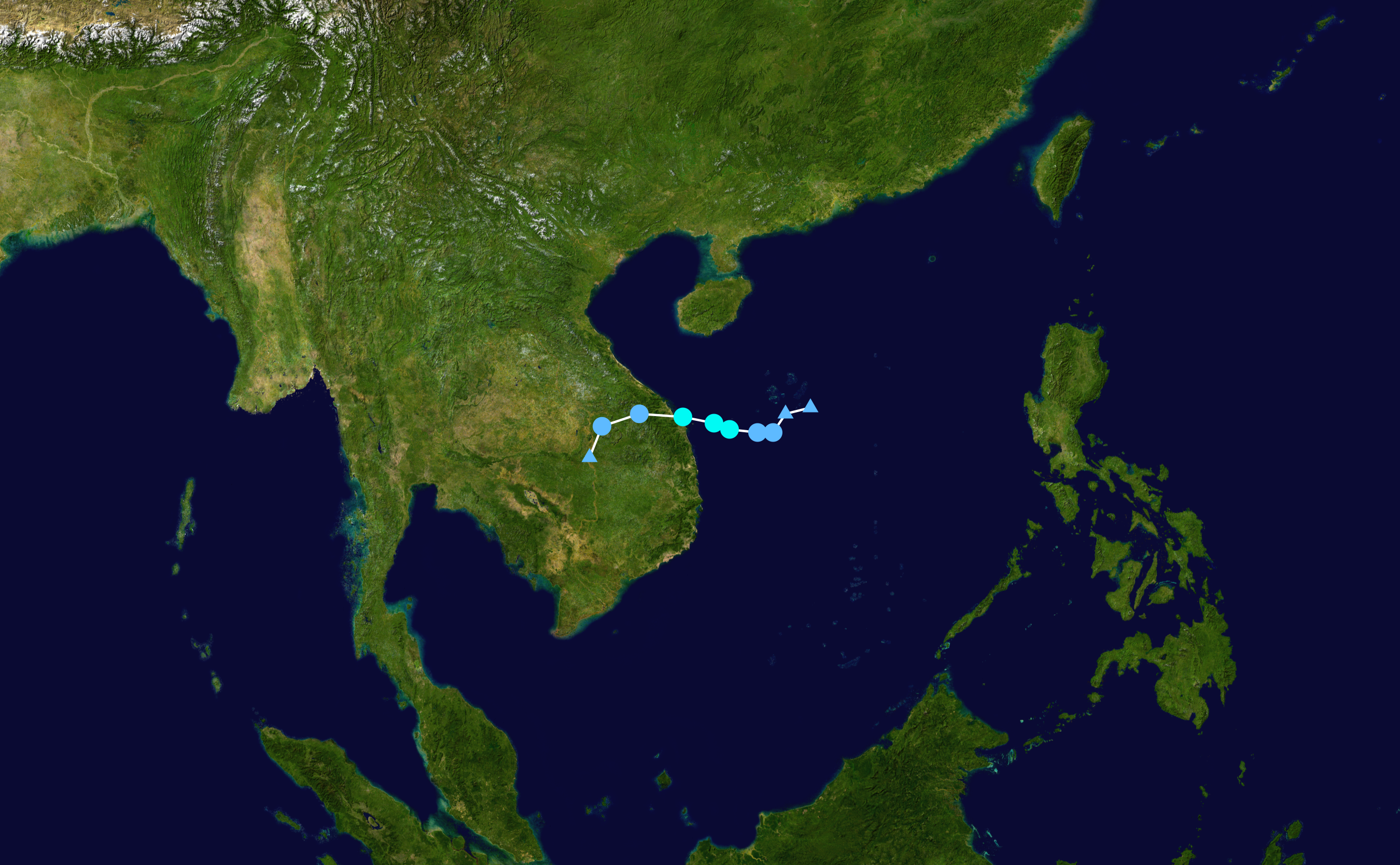
Map plotting the storm's track and intensity, according to the Saffir–Simpson scale Map key Saffir–Simpson scale Tropical depression (≤38 mph, ≤62 km/h) Tropical storm (39–73 mph, 63–118 km/h) Category 1 (74–95 mph, 119–153 km/h) Category 2 (96–110 mph, 154–177 km/h) Category 3 (111–129 mph, 178–208 km/h) Category 4 (130–156 mph, 209–251 km/h) Category 5 (≥157 mph, ≥252 km/h) Unknown Storm type Tropical cyclone Subtropical cyclone Extratropical cyclone, remnant low, tropical disturbance, or monsoon depression

The system that was to become Tropical Storm Vamco was first noted as a tropical disturbance during September 11, while it was located over the South China Sea, about 555 km (345 mi) to the west of Manila in the Philippines. At this time fragmented bands of atmospheric convection were trying to form around the system's low level circulation centre, which was located within a marginal environment for further development. Over the next couple of days the system gradually developed further, before it was classified as a tropical depression during September 13, by both the Japan Meteorological Agency and the United States Joint Typhoon Warning Center. With flaring deep convection surrounding its LLCC, the JTWC started issuing bulletins and was assigned the designation 19W. Thereafter, both the JMA and the JTWC upgraded 19W to a tropical storm, naming it Vamco. On September 14, deep convection slightly weakened and became displaced near its center, however the environment was still favorable at this moment. A few hours later, the JTWC reported that according to animations, the center of Vamco had become partially exposed and wind shear inhibited further development, which favorable conditions started to fade. Therefore, the JTWC issued its final warning. Vamco made landfall south of Da Nang, Vietnam, and the system was last noted as it dissipated over land on September 15.

== Impact ==
The outer bands of Vamco affected Hainan, causing a damage of ¥2 million (US$314,000) in economic losses.

On September 14, before Vamco made landfall, Da Nang suffered some damage from the storm. Over 500 trees were downed in this city and dozens of flights were cancelled.

Vamco made landfall in Quảng Nam Province, causing floods in central Vietnam. Flooding in Vietnam killed 11 people. Losses to fisheries in the Lý Sơn District exceeded ₫1 billion (US$45,000). Damage to the power grid in Vietnam reached ₫4.9 billion (US$218,000). In Quảng Nam Province, Vamco caused moderate damage. In Duy Xuyên District, agricultural losses exceeded ₫2 billion (US$89,000) and in Nông Sơn District total damage amounted to ₫1 billion (US$45,000). Officials in Thanh Hóa Province estimated total damages from the flooding by the storm had reached ₫287 billion (US$12.8 million). Heavy rains caused by the storm in Central Vietnam ended the drought in this area, after many hot days due to the strong El Niño.

Flooding in Cambodia affected thousands of residents and prompted numerous evacuations. The remnants of Vamco triggered flooding in 15 provinces across Thailand and killed two people. At least 480 homes were damaged and losses exceeded ฿20 million (US$556,000). Two fishermen died after their boat sank during the storm off the Ban Laem District while a third remains missing.

== See also ==
- Weather of 2015
- Tropical cyclones in 2015
- Other tropical cyclones named Vamco
- September 2009 Vietnam tropical depression
- Tropical Depression 18W (2013)
- Typhoon Nari (2013)
- Tropical Storm Aere (2016)
- Typhoon Rai (2021)
