= List of storms named Toraji =

The name Toraji (Korean: 도라지, [to̞ɾa̠d͡ʑi]) has been used for five tropical cyclones in the Western Pacific Ocean. The name was contributed by North Korea and refers a type of bellflower (Platycodon grandiflorus) in Korean.

- Typhoon Toraji (2001) (T0108, 11W, Isang) – impacted Taiwan and China, killing at least 200
- Tropical Storm Toraji (2007) (T0703, 03W) – struck Vietnam
- Severe Tropical Storm Toraji (2013) (T1317, 15W) – struck Japan
- Tropical Storm Toraji (2018) (T1827, 32W) – a weak system that struck Vietnam
- Typhoon Toraji (2024) (T2423, 26W, Nika) – a Category 1-typhoon that struck the Philippines

The name Toraji was retired following the 2024 Pacific typhoon season and was replaced with Gaeguri (Korean: 개구리, [kɛɡuɾi]), which means frog in Korean.
