= Typhoon Toraji (2001) =

Pacific typhoon in 2001

Typhoon Toraji (Isang)
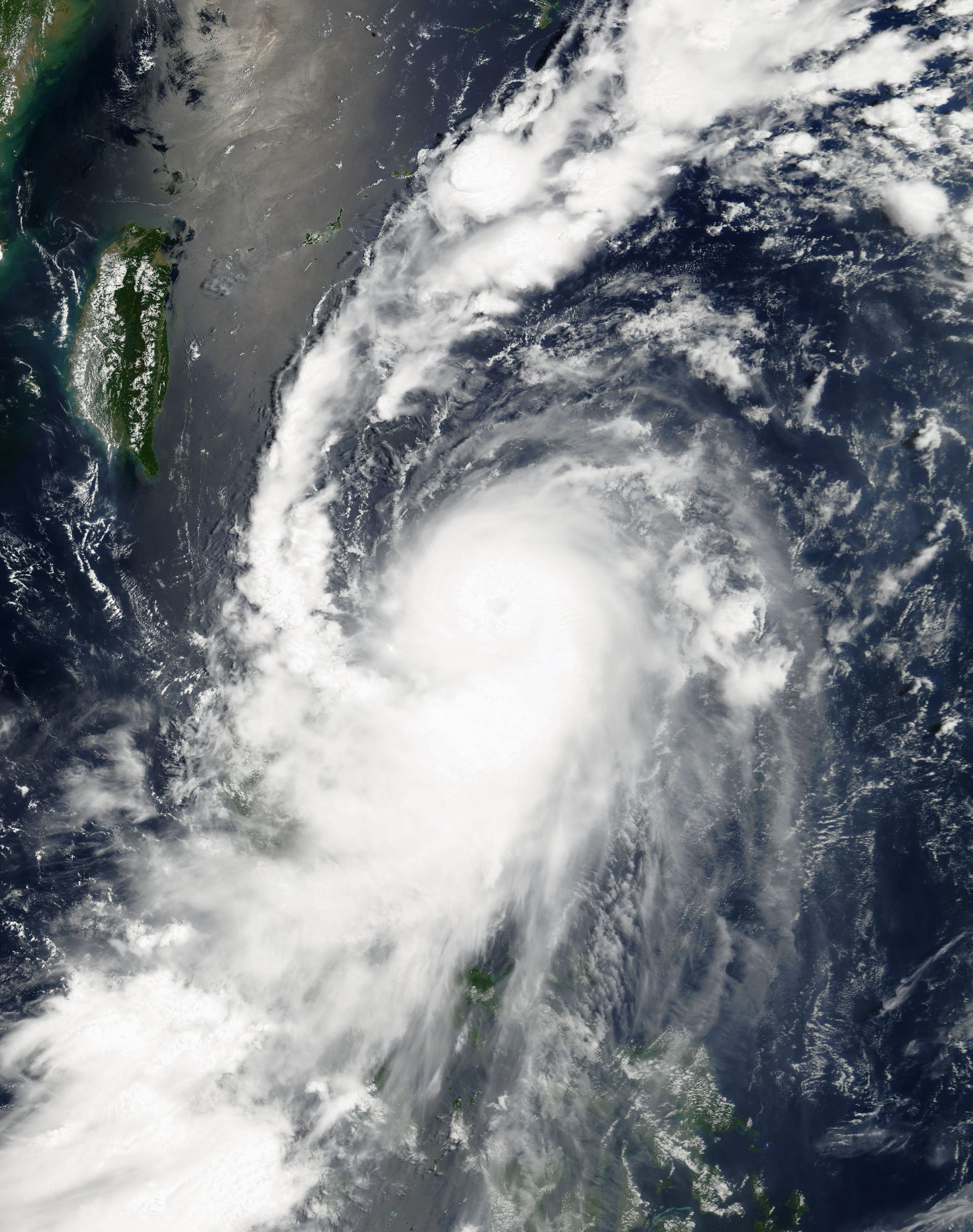
- Toraji strengthening prior to landfall over Taiwan on July 28

Meteorological history
- Formed: July 25, 2001
- Dissipated: August 1, 2001

Typhoon
- 10-minute sustained (JMA)
- Highest winds: 140 km/h (85 mph)
- Lowest pressure: 960 hPa (mbar); 28.35 inHg

Category 3-equivalent typhoon
- 1-minute sustained (SSHWS/JTWC)
- Highest winds: 185 km/h (115 mph)
- Lowest pressure: 944 hPa (mbar); 27.88 inHg

Overall effects
- Fatalities: 200 total
- Missing: 150
- Damage: $245 million (2001 USD)
- Areas affected: Philippines, Taiwan, Ryukyu Islands, South China
- IBTrACS
- Part of the 2001 Pacific typhoon season

Typhoon Toraji, known in the Philippines as Typhoon Isang, was one of the deadliest tropical cyclones to hit the island country of Taiwan, since 1961. The eight named storm and the third typhoon of the 2001 Pacific typhoon season, Toraji originated from an area of convection that persisted to the west of Guam. Moving north-northwestward over favorable conditions, the disturbance intensified to a tropical depression, while the JTWC issued a TCFA on the newly developed system. On July 26, the depression entered the Philippine Area of Responsibility, with the PAGASA naming it Isang. Strong easterly wind shear inhibited further development; however, as the shear relaxed, both the JTWC and PAGASA upgraded the system to a tropical storm with also the JMA following suit hours later. Now named Toraji, the storm slowly intensified, reaching typhoon status on the next day. Toraji continued to gain strength until it made landfall as a Category 2 typhoon near Taipei on July 29. Despite the rugged terrains of the country, the JTWC upgraded the system further to a Category 3, shortly before weakening as it moved offshore on Taiwan Strait. The JMA and PAGASA downgraded the typhoon to a tropical storm, with the latter issuing their final advisory as it moved out of their AOR. It continued to weaken, with the JTWC also downgrading the system to a tropical storm, before making landfall near Fuzhou on July 31 before it was last noted by the next day.

As Toraji hit southern Taiwan, it triggered landslides that destroyed houses. There were reports of flooding throughout the country and the nearby areas of Fuzhou City. Damages attributed from Toraji were estimated at $245 million (2001 USD) and there were over 200 individuals killed.

== Meteorological history ==
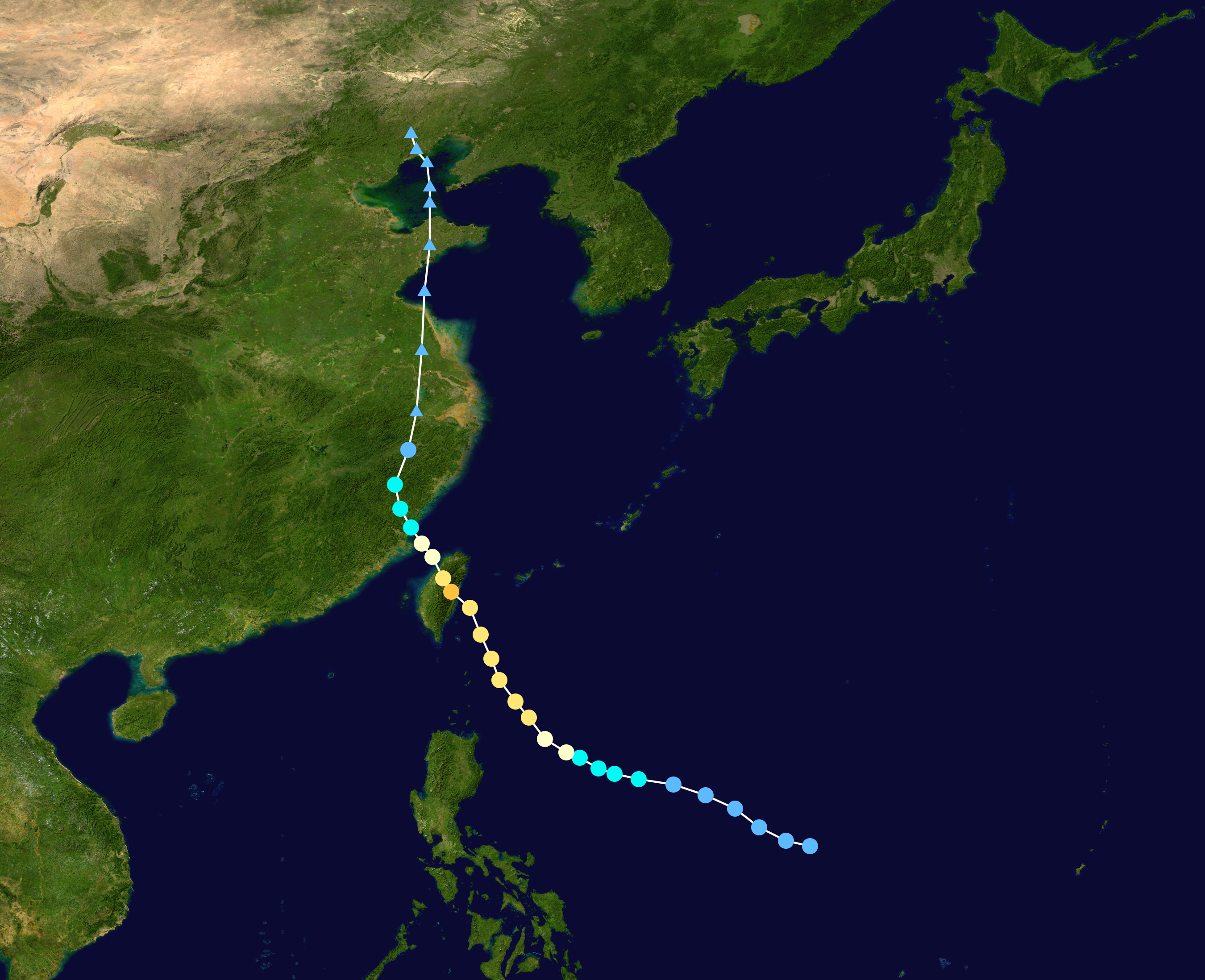
Map plotting the storm's track and intensity, according to the Saffir–Simpson scale Map key Saffir–Simpson scale Tropical depression (≤38 mph, ≤62 km/h) Tropical storm (39–73 mph, 63–118 km/h) Category 1 (74–95 mph, 119–153 km/h) Category 2 (96–110 mph, 154–177 km/h) Category 3 (111–129 mph, 178–208 km/h) Category 4 (130–156 mph, 209–251 km/h) Category 5 (≥157 mph, ≥252 km/h) Unknown Storm type Tropical cyclone Subtropical cyclone Extratropical cyclone, remnant low, tropical disturbance, or monsoon depression

The JMA issued a bulletin on July 24 for a developing area of convection that persisted to the west of Hagåtña, Guam. The convection was embedded in a monsoon trough in a marginally favorable environment. Slow development continued, and the JTWC soon issued a TCFA on the system later the next day. On the same day, the JTWC issued their first warning on Tropical Depression 11W, with its center located approximately 650 nm east-southeast of Luzon's northeastern tip. The depression soon entered the Philippine Area of Responsibility (PAR) early on July 26, assigning the name Isang from the PAGASA. The depression was moving north-northwestward at that time, with a partly exposed core underneath the deep convection's eastern edge. Due to the moderate wind shear impacting the newly formed system, the development was slow; however, the overall environment of Isang was favorable. On 18:00 UTC on July 26, the JMA upgraded the depression to a tropical storm, naming the system Toraji. (Note: The name Toraji (Korean: 도라지, [to̞ɾa̠d͡ʑi]) was contributed by North Korea and refers to a type of bellflower (Platycodon grandiflorus) in Korean.) On July 27, the JMA, JTWC, and the PAGASA all upgraded Toraji to a typhoon. It continued moving northwestward as it continued to approach Taiwan. On 18:00 UTC of July 29, the center of the typhoon made landfall, just south of Taipei as a Category 2 typhoon. By 0600 UTC on July 30, Typhoon Toraji had tracked through Taiwan and had passed out into the Formosa Strait. The storm was still classified as a typhoon by JTWC, but Toraji had been downgraded to a tropical storm by the other warning centers. Around 19:30 UTC on the next day, the weakening Toraji made landfall near Lianjiang and was subject to weakening. The last warning was given by JTWC on August 1, as it transitioned to an extratropical storm near Shanghai.

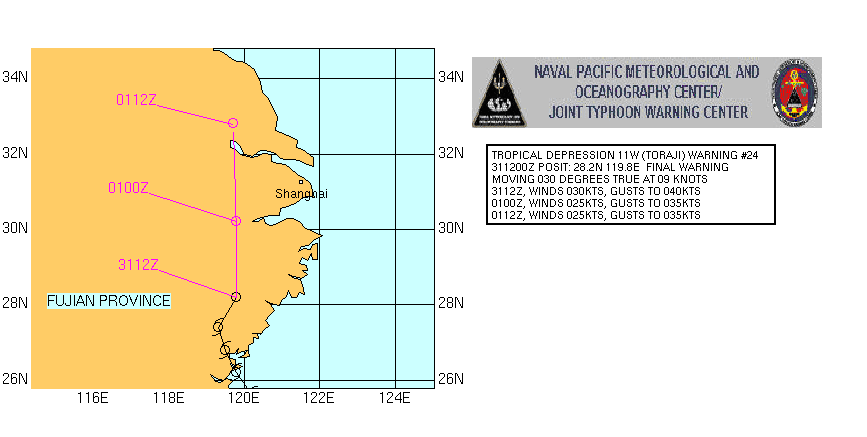
The final warning for Toraji by the JTWC on August 1

== Impact ==
According to different agencies and media reports from Taiwan and China, Typhoon Toraji left over 200 deaths and about 150 people missing.

=== Taiwan and China ===
Over 340,000 people were without electricity due to the typhoon. 21 people are killed and about 30 persons are missing in the town of Guangfu, in eastern Hualien County, Taiwan. The most badly affected areas in Taiwan were Hualien and Nantou's mountainous central district. Mudslides and floods swept houses, bridges, and mountain highways clear. The Agriculture Council of Taiwan reported that there could be $4 million in damage to land, livestock, and agricultural districts.

Despite Toraji striking Fuzhou City in China as a tropical storm, the damages, and fatalities attributed to the storm are unknown.

== See also ==
- Other tropical cyclones named Toraji
- Other tropical cyclones named Isang
- Typhoon Chebi (2001) – a typhoon that also made landfall, very near where Toraji made its final strike
- Tropical Storm Trami (2001) – a tropical storm that made a direct hit on Taiwan
- Typhoon Morakot (2009) – the deadliest typhoon to impact Taiwan in recorded history
- Typhoon Kong-rey (2024) – a stronger typhoon which had a similar trajectory to Toraji
