= Tropical Storm Toraji (2007) =

Pacific tropical storm in 2007

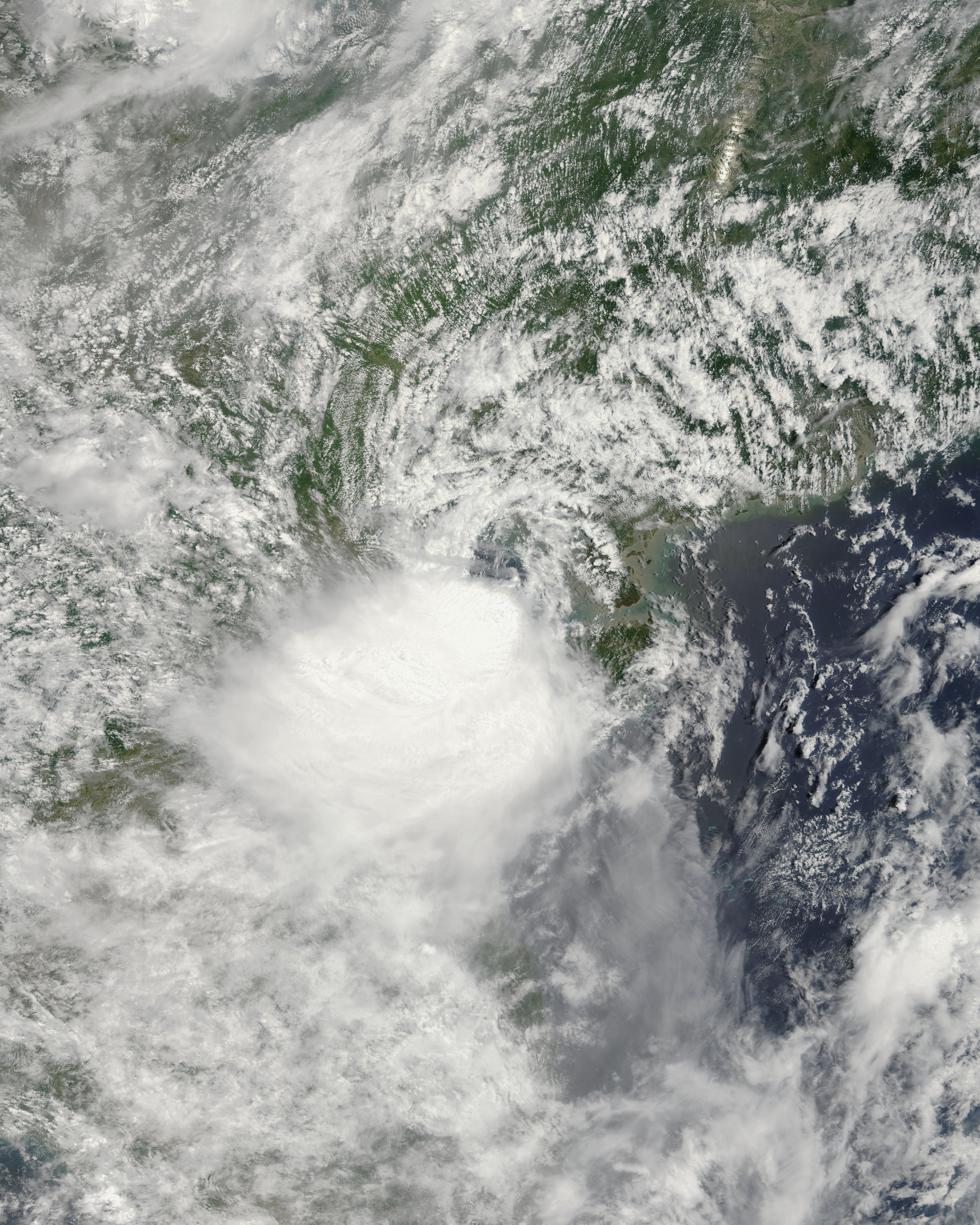
- Tropical Storm Toraji at peak intensity on July 5

Meteorological history
- Formed: July 4, 2007
- Dissipated: July 5, 2007

Tropical storm
- 10-minute sustained (JMA)
- Highest winds: 65 km/h (40 mph)
- Lowest pressure: 994 hPa (mbar); 29.35 inHg

Tropical storm
- 1-minute sustained (SSHWS/JTWC)
- Highest winds: 65 km/h (40 mph)
- Lowest pressure: 996 hPa (mbar); 29.41 inHg

Overall effects
- Fatalities: None reported
- Damage: $9.7 million (2007 USD)
- Areas affected: China; Vietnam
- IBTrACS
- Part of the 2007 Pacific typhoon season

Tropical Storm Toraji was a short-lived and minimal tropical cyclone that brought inundating rainfall to areas of Southeast Asia in early July 2007. The third named storm of the annual typhoon season, Toraji developed from an area of disturbed weather within the South China Sea on July 4. As a result of its northwesterly track, the tropical depression moved over Hainan shortly after tropical cyclogenesis. Upon its emergence into the Gulf of Tonkin on July 5, Toraji quickly intensified into a tropical storm with winds of 65 km/h (40 mph); (Note: All maximum sustained wind values are sustained for ten minutes and rounded to the nearest five unless otherwise noted, following the standard set by the World Meteorological Organization.) (Note: All currencies are converted to United States Dollars using Oanda with an exchange rate on July 5, 2007.) this would be the tropical cyclone's peak intensity for its entire duration. However, the JMA indicated that tropical storm intensity had been reached a day earlier. On the evening of July 5, Toraji made its final landfall on Dongxing, Guangxi before rapidly deteriorating inland and degenerating into a remnant low-pressure area by the following day.

During its two-day duration, Toraji brought heavy rainfall to areas of southeastern China and Vietnam. Prior to impacting China, 147,000 people were evacuated from potentially affected regions. In that country, the storm's effects were spread out over a 800,000–1,200,000 km^{2} (310,000–460,000 mi^{2}) area. The torrential rainfall produced by the tropical storm damaged agricultural land and destroyed several hundred homes, while damaging many more. Total damage in China was estimated at CN¥73 million ($9.6 million). (Note: All damage totals are in United States dollars unless otherwise noted.) Despite making landfall near the border of Vietnam and China, effects in the former were generally minimal. However, several fishing boats capsized offshore; these sinkings did not result in any deaths.

== Meteorological history ==
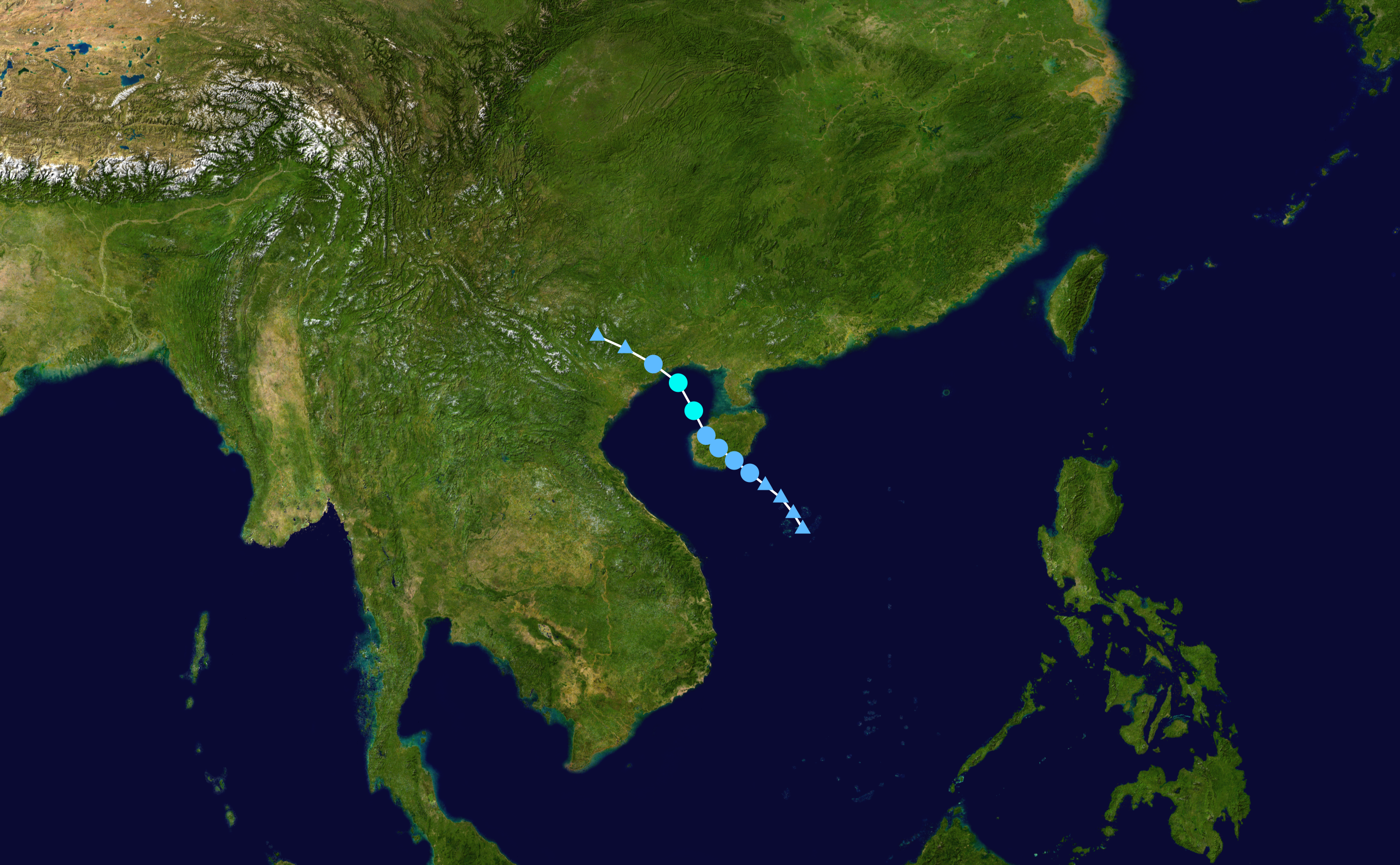
Map plotting the storm's track and intensity, according to the Saffir–Simpson scale Map key Saffir–Simpson scale Tropical depression (≤38 mph, ≤62 km/h) Tropical storm (39–73 mph, 63–118 km/h) Category 1 (74–95 mph, 119–153 km/h) Category 2 (96–110 mph, 154–177 km/h) Category 3 (111–129 mph, 178–208 km/h) Category 4 (130–156 mph, 209–251 km/h) Category 5 (≥157 mph, ≥252 km/h) Unknown Storm type Tropical cyclone Subtropical cyclone Extratropical cyclone, remnant low, tropical disturbance, or monsoon depression

In early July 2007, an area of disturbed weather began to persist in the South China Sea roughly 155 mi (250 km) southeast of Hainan. The Japan Meteorological Agency (JMA) classified the system as a tropical depression at 0000 UTC on July 3 after the storm had organized sufficiently, however, other tracking agencies did not indicate that tropical cyclogenesis had occurred at the time. However, the Joint Typhoon Warning Center (JTWC) began to monitor the disturbance for potential signs of tropical cyclogenesis at 0100 UTC later that day, At the time, the storm system was situated in an area of weak to moderate wind shear, exposing the disturbance's low-level circulation center. Despite the prevailing conditions and proximity to land, the storm continued to organize, and as such the JTWC issued a tropical cyclone formation alert for the system at 0130 UTC the following day.

As it tracked in a general northwesterly direction, intensification continued, and both the JMA and JTWC consequently upgraded the disturbance to tropical storm intensity at 0600 UTC on July 4, giving the storm the name Toraji. (Note: The name Toraji (Korean: 도라지, [to̞ɾa̠d͡ʑi]) was contributed by North Korea and refers to a type of bellflower (Platycodon grandiflorus) in Korean.) Meanwhile, the Hong Kong Observatory (HKO) upgraded the same system to tropical depression status. At the same time, Toraji made its first landfall on Hainan Island. According to the JMA, the tropical storm had winds of 65 km/h (40 mph) and a minimum barometric pressure of 996 mbar (hPa; 29.42 inHg). As the cyclone passed over the island, Toraji weakened marginally, and whilst the HKO and JMA maintained their prior intensities for the system, the JTWC downgraded Toraji to tropical depression status at 1800 UTC before a subsequent re-upgrade as the cyclone emerged into the Gulf of Tonkin early the following day. Once over open water, modest intensification ensued, with the storm reaching peak intensity at 1800 UTC on July 4 with winds still at 65 km/h (40 mph) and a pressure of 994 mbar (hPa; 29.36 inHg). Six hours later on the following day, the HKO upgraded Toraji to tropical storm intensity. After having tracked north-northwestward along the western periphery of a subtropical ridge, Toraji made its final landfall near Cẩm Phả, Vietnam at approximately 1200 UTC on July 5 at the same intensity. Six hours later, all three agencies downgraded Toraji to tropical depression intensity. By that time, the JTWC had ceased the issuance of tropical cyclone products on the storm. However, the JMA and HKO continued to monitor the system until 0000 UTC on July 5.

== Preparations and impact ==
Due to the impending threat of Toraji, Chinese officials evacuated over 147,000 people from areas potentially affected by the cyclone. Upon making its first landfall in China, Toraji became the first of six tropical cyclones to move ashore the country in the first three quarters of 2007. The system's effects were spread out over a region approximately 800,000–1,200,000 km^{2} (310,000–460,000 mi^{2}) in area. In Guangxi, Toraji caused extensive impacts. In Dongxing, a weather station clocked gusts peaking at 120 km/h (75 mph). Associated rains destroyed approximately 16,600 acres (6,700 ha) of farm and agricultural land, and the resulting flooding caused the collapse of 376 homes. An additional 946 residences sustained at least partial damage. In China, the total economic loss resulting from Toraji was estimated at approximately CN¥73 million ($9.6 million).

In preparation for the tropical storm, the Government of Vietnam redirected all boats back to port in Ha Long Bay. A hundred people were evacuated from low-lying areas prone to landslides. Off of Vietnam, late reports indicated that several small fishing vessels were sunk by Toraji in Quảng Ninh Province, located in the northern part of the country. However, no deaths resulted in these sinkings. On Bach Long Vi, a station recorded 152 mm (5.98 in) of rain. Further inland, damage from Toraji in Vietnam remained generally minimal. Throughout northern areas of the country, an average of 155 mm (6.1 in) of rain fell, leading to flooding and landslides. At least 27 homes were damaged and 13 others were destroyed by the storm, leaving millions of Vietnamese đồng in losses. A power station at a nearby military base was also damaged during the storm, causing roughly ₫40 million (US$2,240) in damage.

== See also ==
- Other tropical cyclones named Toraji
- Tropical Storm Mun (2019) – had similar track and intensity as Toraji
- Tropical Storm Mekkhala – Brought heavy rains and flooding to Southeastern Asia, particularly Hainan
- Tropical Storm Maysak (2026) – had similar track and affected same area in July 2026
