= List of storms named Vamco =

The name Vamco (Vietnamese: Vàm Cỏ, [vaːm˨˩ kɔ˧˩]) has been used for four tropical cyclones in the western North Pacific Ocean. The name was contributed by Vietnam and refers to the Vàm Cỏ River in southern Vietnam.

- Tropical Storm Vamco (2003) (T0311, 12W, Manang) – struck China.
- Typhoon Vamco (2009) (T0910, 11W) – Category 4-equivalent typhoon, churned in the open ocean.
- Tropical Storm Vamco (2015) (T1519, 19W) - struck Vietnam.
- Typhoon Vamco (2020) (T2022, 25W, Ulysses) - powerful Category 4-equivalent typhoon, made landfall on Luzon and in Vietnam.

The name Vamco was retired following the 2020 Pacific typhoon season and was replaced with Bang-Lang (Vietnamese: bằng lăng, [ʔɓaŋ˨˩ laŋ˧˧]), which means a giant crepe-myrtle (Lagerstroemia speciosa) in Vietnamese.

- Typhoon Bang-Lang (2026) (T2623, 20W) - a Category 1 typhoon that affected Wake Island
