= Tropical Storm Toraji (2018) =

Pacific tropical storm in 2018

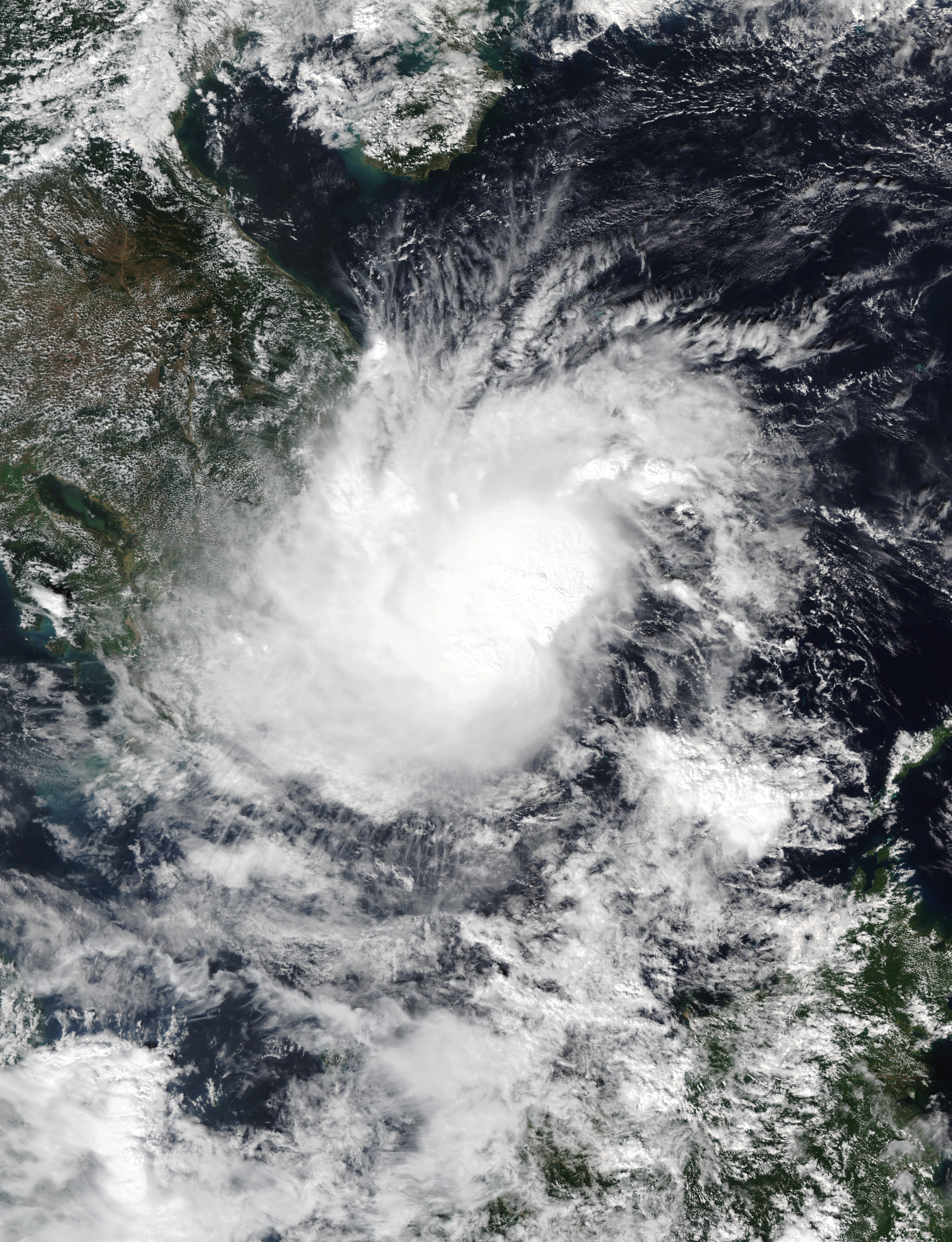
- Tropical Storm Toraji nearing landfall in Vietnam on November 17

Meteorological history
- Formed: November 16, 2018
- Dissipated: November 18, 2018 (Note: The Japan Meteorological Agency (JMA) is the Regional Specialized Meteorological Center of the Northwest Pacific basin, and therefore it is the JMA's data regarding Toraji's duration that is listed here. The US-based Joint Typhoon Warning Center (JTWC), which issues unofficial warnings for tropical cyclones in the Northwest Pacific, tracked Toraji until November 20.)

Tropical storm
- 10-minute sustained (JMA)
- Highest winds: 65 km/h (40 mph)
- Lowest pressure: 1004 hPa (mbar); 29.65 inHg

Tropical depression
- 1-minute sustained (SSHWS/JTWC)
- Highest winds: 55 km/h (35 mph)
- Lowest pressure: 1000 hPa (mbar); 29.53 inHg

Overall effects
- Fatalities: 32 total
- Damage: $53.9 million (2018 USD)
- Areas affected: Vietnam, Malaysia, Thailand
- IBTrACS
- Part of the 2018 Pacific typhoon season

Tropical Storm Toraji (Note: The name Toraji (Korean: 도라지, [to̞ɾa̠d͡ʑi]) was contributed by North Korea and refers to a type of bellflower (Platycodon grandiflorus) in Korean.) was a weak, short-lived system that impacted Vietnam in mid-November 2018. Forming as the twenty-seventh named storm of the 2018 Pacific typhoon season, Toraji developed as a tropical depression to the southeast of Vietnam on November 16. Quickly organising, the system strengthened into a tropical storm the next day. Toraji rapidly weakened thereafter early on November 18, when the storm made landfall over southeastern Vietnam, later dissipating. The storm's remnants moved into the Gulf of Thailand when Toraji re-organised back into a tropical depression on November 20. However Toraji quickly deteriorated on the same day as it moved closer to the Malay Peninsula.

Despite being a weak storm, Toraji brought heavy rainfall which lead to flash flooding and landslides, mostly in the southern provinces of Vietnam. This resulted in a total of 32 people dead, with the majority of them being in the Khanh Hoa province. Damages were toppled up to ₫1.24 billion (US$53.9 million).

== Meteorological history ==
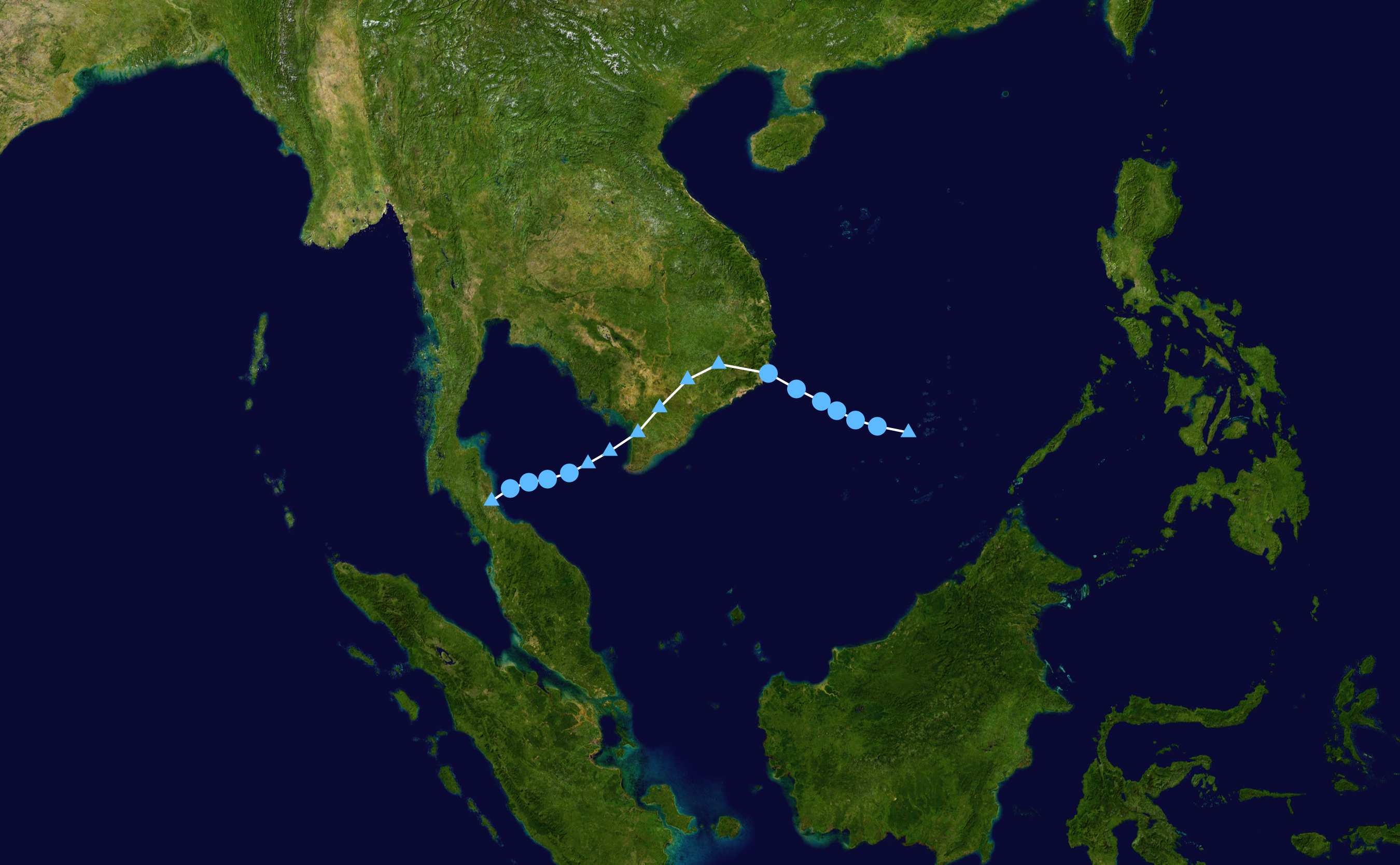
Map plotting the storm's track and intensity, according to the Saffir–Simpson scale Map key Saffir–Simpson scale Tropical depression (≤38 mph, ≤62 km/h) Tropical storm (39–73 mph, 63–118 km/h) Category 1 (74–95 mph, 119–153 km/h) Category 2 (96–110 mph, 154–177 km/h) Category 3 (111–129 mph, 178–208 km/h) Category 4 (130–156 mph, 209–251 km/h) Category 5 (≥157 mph, ≥252 km/h) Unknown Storm type Tropical cyclone Subtropical cyclone Extratropical cyclone, remnant low, tropical disturbance, or monsoon depression

On November 15, the Joint Typhoon Warning Center (JTWC) began monitoring on a tropical disturbance that had developed about 835 km (519 mi) to the east of Ho Chi Minh City, Vietnam. After being located in an area of favourable environments with very low vertical wind shear, the tropical disturbance gradually intensified, which prompted the Japan Meteorological Agency (JMA) to start classifying it as a tropical depression. Shortly thereafter, the JTWC issued a Tropical Cyclone Formation Alert (TCFA). By November 17, under the influence of high sea-surface temperatures and good upper-level outflow, the JMA immediately initiated advisories and upgraded the depression to a tropical storm, naming it Toraji. (Note: The name Toraji (Korean: 도라지, [to̞ɾa̠d͡ʑi]) was contributed by North Korea and refers to a type of bellflower (Platycodon grandiflorus) in Korean.) On 15:00 UTC of the same day, satellite imagery had depicted a large cluster of deep convection persisting near the system's low-level circulation center. This prompted the JTWC to begin issuing advisories as a tropical depression, with the designation of 32W.

Six hours after the JTWC began issuing advisories, the deep convection located near the storm's center became displaced and sheared. At this point, the JTWC no longer expected Toraji to intensify into a tropical storm, and hence, Toraji reached its 10-minute maximum sustained winds of 65 km/h (40 mph) with a barometric pressure of 1,004 mbar (29.6 inHg). At around 00:00 UTC of November 18, Toraji made landfall over the southeastern coast of Vietnam, about 28 km (17 mi) south of Cam Ranh Bay. Six hours later, Toraji began to weaken and the JMA downgraded the storm to a tropical depression. The JTWC followed suit three hours later when the system's center became elongated and the deep convection became disorganised. However, the JMA tracked Toraji until 12:00 UTC of the same day as it moved further over land.

The remnants of Toraji meandered over the southern portion of Vietnam for a couple of days until it turned toward the southwest and entering the Gulf of Thailand. By 09:00 UTC of November 20, satellite imagery showed a new burst of convection along convective banding wrapping into the system's center. This prompted the JTWC to re-issue advisories on Toraji. However, Toraji's convective signature did not last long within the JTWC's next advisory. Therefore, the JTWC issued its final advisory on Toraji on 21:00 UTC of the same day, as the storm made landfall on the Malay Peninsula.

== Preparations and impact ==
Toraji was the eighth tropical system to affect Vietnam in 2018, hence the local designation of Cơn bão số 8. Local authorities are preparing to evacuate vulnerable residents to safety. Fishing boats and ships were banned on setting sail in nearby areas of the Can Gio District. The National Center for Hydrometeorological Forecasting forecast that provinces over in the southern portion of Vietnam would experience rainfall of about 70–150 mm (2.8–5.9 in), along with heavy and scattered thunderstorms from November 17 through to 19. Any areas near rivers in the south and central regions were expected to have a higher-risk of flooding, with Binh Dinh and Phu Yen under Disaster Alert Level 1, while the rivers in Khanh Hoa and Binh Thuan were under Disaster Alert Level 2. Risks of landslides were greater–with mountainous, low-lying and even urban communities in the central regions getting the risk.

After the passage of the storm, Vietnam's southern provinces experienced vast areas of flash flooding. In the province of Khanh Hoa, a two-day rainfall from November 17–18 were measured to up to 200 mm (7.9 in). The city of Nha Trang experienced a rain total of 380 mm (15 in). Low-lying communities saw houses being submerged by more than one meter. To ensure the safety of the students from the damages, schools were closed on November 19, where an estimated total of 90,000 students were forced to stay at home. Villages over mountainous areas experiences landslides that buried homes. The main highway that linked Northern and Southern Vietnam was temporarily blocked along with interruptions of rail service due to heavy debris, where 400 train passengers have remained stranded. At least 17 people have perished from the storm in Nha Trang alone. The city's chairman criticised the local authorities for "late responses" to the damages caused, and the areas where landslides have killed people weren't included in the list of landslide-prone areas given to city authorities. A report a few months after the storm stated that a total of 20 people have died, with total damages measured at ₫1.24 billion (US$53.9 million).

== See also ==
- Other storm named Toraji
- Weather of 2018
- Tropical cyclones in 2018
- Tropical Depression Wilma (2013)
- November 2016 Vietnam tropical depression
- Typhoon Tembin (2017)
