= September 2009 Vietnam tropical depression =

Pacific tropical depression in 2009

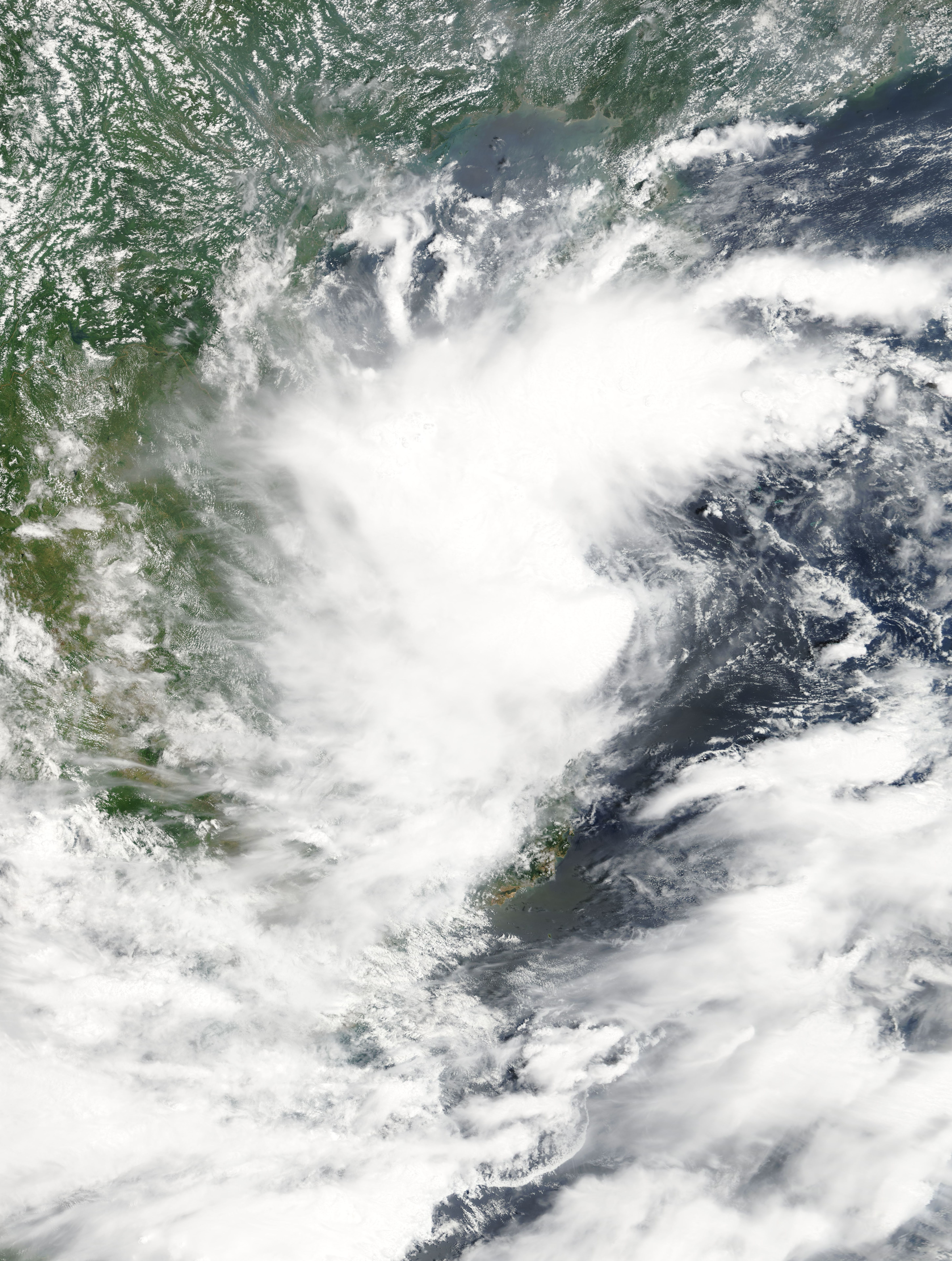
- The tropical depression off the coast of Vietnam on September 3

Meteorological history
- Formed: September 3, 2009
- Dissipated: September 9, 2009

Tropical depression
- 10-minute sustained (JMA)
- Highest winds: 55 km/h (35 mph)
- Lowest pressure: 1000 hPa (mbar); 29.53 inHg

Overall effects
- Fatalities: 13 total
- Damage: $32 million (2009 USD)
- Areas affected: Vietnam
- Part of the 2009 Pacific typhoon season

The September 2009 Vietnam tropical depression was a weak tropical depression that caused deadly flooding throughout central Vietnam in early September. Forming out of an area of low pressure on September 3, the depression hardly intensified as it meandered off the coast of Vietnam. Initially situated in a favorable environment, convective banding features began to develop and shower and thunderstorm activity formed near the center. On September 4, the Joint Typhoon Warning Center issued a Tropical Cyclone Formation Alert; however, a sudden increase in wind shear caused the system to rapidly become disorganized, leading to the cancellation of the alert the next day. The system continued to slowly track off the coast of Vietnam, nearly dissipating on September 5, before becoming better organized. However, the depression remained weak, with the JTWC reporting on September 7 that the depression had dissipated, though the Japan Meteorological Agency (JMA) continued to issue advisories until the depression dissipated during September 9.

Although the depression did not make landfall, the outer rainbands of the storm led to heavy rainfall throughout central Vietnam, peaking at 430 mm (17 in). The ensuing floods killed at least six people and left three others missing. Large areas of cropland were inundated by the waters and numerous homes were damaged.

== Meteorological history ==
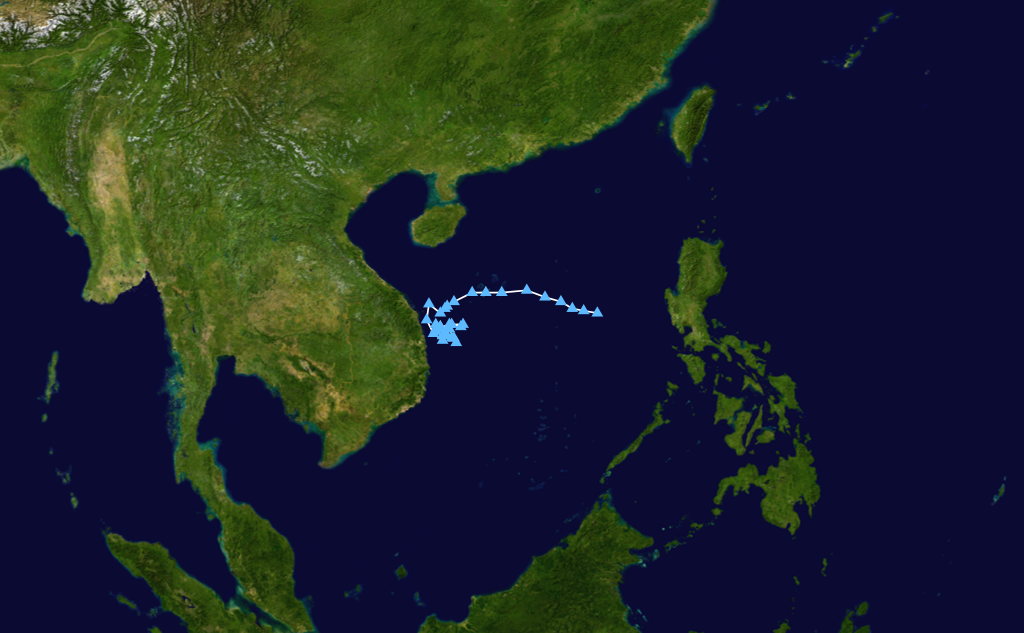
Map plotting the storm's track and intensity, according to the Saffir–Simpson scale Map key Saffir–Simpson scale Tropical depression (≤38 mph, ≤62 km/h) Tropical storm (39–73 mph, 63–118 km/h) Category 1 (74–95 mph, 119–153 km/h) Category 2 (96–110 mph, 154–177 km/h) Category 3 (111–129 mph, 178–208 km/h) Category 4 (130–156 mph, 209–251 km/h) Category 5 (≥157 mph, ≥252 km/h) Unknown Storm type Tropical cyclone Subtropical cyclone Extratropical cyclone, remnant low, tropical disturbance, or monsoon depression

The tropical depression originated from an area of low pressure in the South China Sea on September 1. Scattered convection was associated with the system, with the center devoid of showers and thunderstorms, as the low slowly tracked westward in a weak steering environment. Weak outflow had formed along the northern edge of the system; however, intensification was not anticipated. The following day, convection began to form around the center of circulation and weak diffluence was noted around the system due to an anticyclone to the north. With low wind shear, convective banding features began to develop and the possibility of the system becoming a tropical cyclone increased. Early on September 3, the JMA began issuing advisories on the cyclone, classifying it as a tropical depression, the twentieth depression to be monitored by the JMA during the season.

Although the system had a partially exposed low-level circulation center, the Joint Typhoon Warning Center (JTWC) issued a Tropical Cyclone Formation Alert (TCFA) as the depression was likely to intensify as it was situated over high sea surface temperatures and in a favorable environment. However, by September 4, wind shear quickly increased and dislocated all of the convection associated with the depression from the center of circulation. This led to the JTWC canceling their TCFA as the environment was no longer favorable for development. The following day, the JTWC declared that the system had dissipated and was no longer a suspect area for tropical cyclone development as the system was virtually stationary off the coast of Vietnam. The JMA, on the other hand, continued to monitor the cyclone as a tropical depression. Although previously declaring that the system dissipated early on September 6, the JTWC began monitoring the re-developing system later that day. Convective banding had reformed, wind shear had decreased and the cyclone had less interaction with land as it slowly moved further into the South China Sea. However, late on September 8, both agencies declared that the depression had dissipated off the coast of Vietnam.

== Impact ==
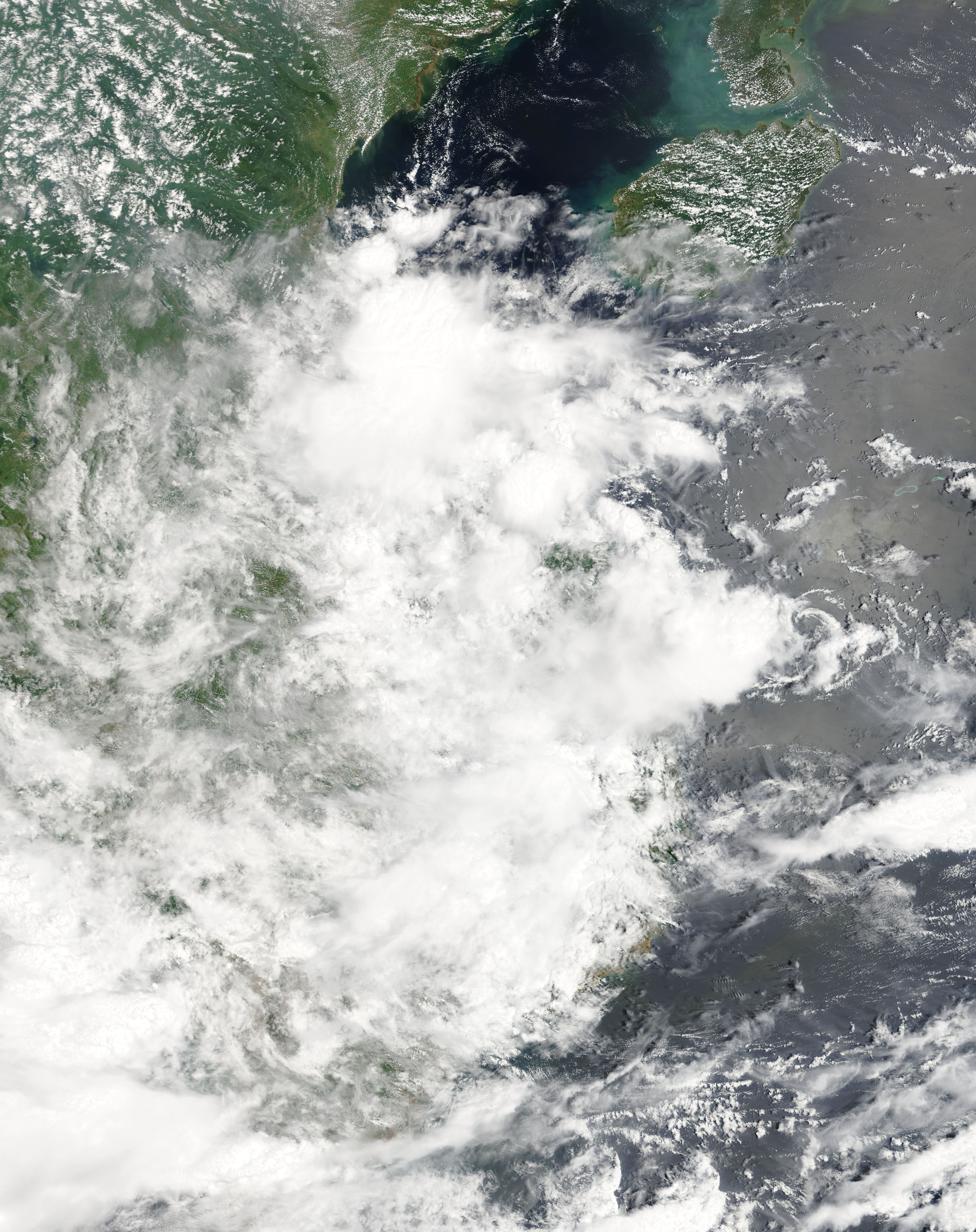
The tropical depression on September 5.

At least six people were killed, three were left missing and nine were injured by the depression throughout Vietnam. Rainfall from the storm exceeded 430 mm (17 in), triggering widespread flash flooding. A maximum of 540 mm (21 in) fell in Huế. Sixty-one tons of fish were swept away during the floods and 8,700 hectares of rice fields were destroyed. The city of Da Nang sustained the worst flooding from the storm, with some areas reporting flood depths of .8 m (2.6 ft). Schools throughout the area were closed as many residents were unable to pass through flooded streets. A sixth grader drowned in the city after the boat he was on overturned in flood waters. In Huế, a two-year-old drowned in flood waters on September 4. A large section of highway 14B, connecting Nam Đông and Huế was washed away. In Quảng Ngãi Province, two fishermen were left missing and five other people were injured by the storm. At least three homes sustained severe damage. Residents throughout Quảng Trị Province were advised to evacuate to safer areas as numerous landslides threatened homes.

Numerous bridges were washed away by flood waters exceeding 1.5 m (4.9 ft), isolating several communities. In the Sơn Tịnh District, 76 structures were destroyed by flooding and high winds. More than 200 homes were inundated by up to 0.7 m (2.3 ft) of flood waters in the communities of Hoa Tho Dong and Hoa Phat. At least one ship sank and officials lost contact with two others; officials stated that 1,178 boats were in the South China Sea in the storm. In the valleys of Tam Kỳ and Phú Ninh, nearly 1,000 homes were inundated by water. Roughly 20% of the 373,000 students starting school were told to remain home as their schools were closed due to flood waters. By September 7, officials in Quảng Nam Province estimated that property damages from the depression had reached 20 billion (VND; $1.12 million USD) and agricultural losses amounted to 25 billion (VND; $1.4 million USD). Throughout other regions, at least 100 structures were damaged and more than 20,000 hectares of crops were submerged in flood waters. Damages to irrigation systems throughout the county amounted to 3 billion (VND; $168,000 USD). Total damages from the system in Vietnam were estimated at 542 billion (VND; $32 million USD) and 13 people were dead.

== See also ==
- November 2016 Vietnam tropical depression
- Tropical Depression 18W (2013)
- Typhoon Mirinae (2009)
- Tropical Storm Kajiki (2019)
