= Tropical Depression 18W (2013) =

Pacific tropical depression in 2013

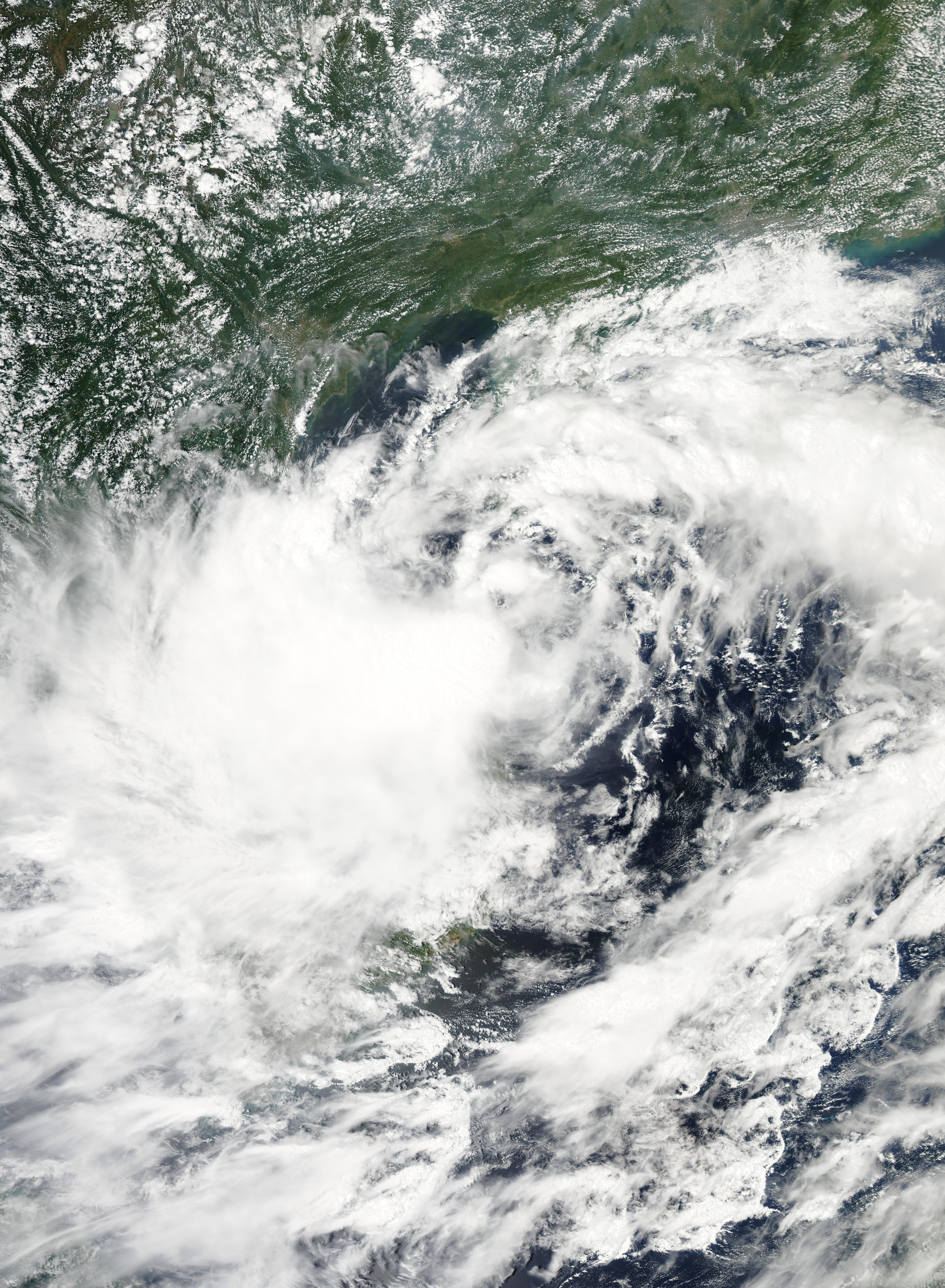
- Tropical Depression 18W on September 18

Meteorological history
- Formed: September 16, 2013
- Dissipated: September 21, 2013

Tropical depression
- 10-minute sustained (JMA)
- Highest winds: 55 km/h (35 mph)
- Lowest pressure: 996 hPa (mbar); 29.41 inHg

Tropical depression
- 1-minute sustained (SSHWS/JTWC)
- Highest winds: 45 km/h (30 mph)
- Lowest pressure: 1004 hPa (mbar); 29.65 inHg

Tropical storm
- 2-minute sustained (NCHMF)
- Highest winds: 65 km/h (40 mph)
- Highest gusts: 95 km/h (60 mph)
- Lowest pressure: 996

Overall effects
- Fatalities: 27
- Damage: $96.6 million (2013 USD)
- Areas affected: Vietnam, Laos, Thailand
- IBTrACS
- Part of the 2013 Pacific typhoon season

Tropical Depression 18W in Vietnam as Storm No. 8 of 2013 (Vietnamese: Bão số 8 năm 2013) was a tropical depression that impacted Vietnam, Laos and Thailand during mid September 2013. The system was first noted as a tropical depression on September 16, 2013, while it was located within the South China Sea to the south east of Hanoi in Vietnam. Over the next two days the system gradually developed further, before it was reported by the Vietnamese National Centre for Hydro Meteorological Forecasting that the system had developed into their eighth tropical storm of 2013. However, other meteorological agencies did not report that the system had developed into a tropical storm.

In Vietnam, flooding triggered by the storm killed at least seven people and 5,000 homes were damaged or destroyed. Severe flooding took place in neighboring Laos where at least 10,000 structures were damaged and losses reached $61 million (United States dollars).

== Meteorological history ==
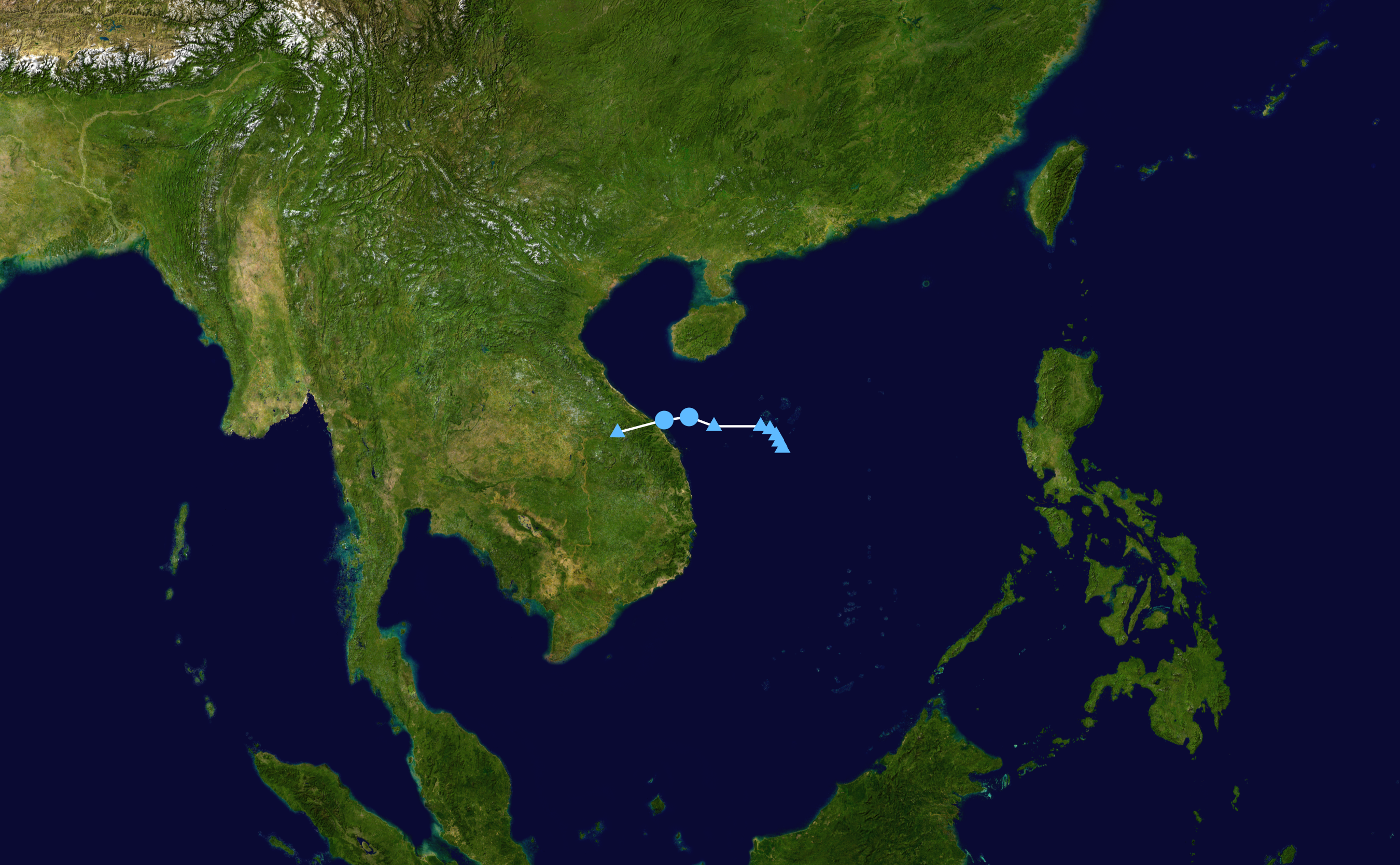
Map plotting the storm's track and intensity, according to the Saffir–Simpson scale Map key Saffir–Simpson scale Tropical depression (≤38 mph, ≤62 km/h) Tropical storm (39–73 mph, 63–118 km/h) Category 1 (74–95 mph, 119–153 km/h) Category 2 (96–110 mph, 154–177 km/h) Category 3 (111–129 mph, 178–208 km/h) Category 4 (130–156 mph, 209–251 km/h) Category 5 (≥157 mph, ≥252 km/h) Unknown Storm type Tropical cyclone Subtropical cyclone Extratropical cyclone, remnant low, tropical disturbance, or monsoon depression

On September 16, the Japan Meteorological Agency (JMA) and the Vietnam's National Centre for Hydro-Meteorological Forecasting (NCHMF) reported that a tropical depression had developed within an area of low to moderate vertical windshear, about 1,000 km (620 mi) to the southeast of Hà Nội, Vietnam. Over the next two days the depression gradually developed further as it moved westwards, before the VNCHMF reported during September 17, that the system had developed into their eighth tropical storm of the season. Later that day as vertical windshear over the system decreased slightly, the Joint Typhoon Warning Center (JTWC) issued a Tropical Cyclone Formation Alert. During the next day after the depressions low level circulation center had started to consolidate, the JTWC initiated advisories and designated the system as Tropical Depression 18W. During that day the system moved westwards along the southern edge of the subtropical ridge of high pressure, before the JTWC issued its final warning on the system later that day after the depression had made landfall on Vietnam, near the port city of Da Nang. Over the next couple of days the system continued to move westwards and moved through Vietnam, Laos and Thailand, before it was last noted on September 21 over the Thai province of Phetchabun.

== Impact ==
=== Vietnam ===
On September 17, one of the deputy prime ministers of Vietnam Hoàng Trung Hải, asked the Central Committee for Flood and Storm Control and the National Committee for Search and Rescue, to be prepared for the system impacting Vietnam. He also asked local authorities and border guards to call on vessels, between Quang Binh and Phu Yen provinces to take shelter and evacuate people in vulnerable areas to higher places. Several ministries and agencies were tasked to inspect the safety of dams and reservoirs in response to possible flooding.

During September 18, the system made landfall on Vietnam with provinces from Thừa Thiên–Huế and Quảng Nam provinces affected by a moderate rain, heavy rain and flooding

Storm and rain storm caused the provinces of Khanh Hoa to Nghe An and north west Highlands, along with a flood to 10 dead and 12 missing, 6 wounded.Đắk Lắk Province suffered the worst of people and property, with 5 dead and 7 missing. More than 2,000 home houses were flooded, 2,100 households in Ea Sup district emergency relocation. Thousands of hectares of rice and crops damaged. Many roads were flooded Ea Sup districts of fragmentation in some areas.

In Hà Tĩnh, due to the storm, in Hà Tĩnh heavy rain, wind tugging at category 6 to 7 of Beaufort scale and tornadoes cause more damage to the people. The total damage caused by a tornado more than VND 500 million (US$24,000). In Nghe An, 13 people killed by floods, total damage reached VND 392 billion (US$18.6 million). In Nam Dong (Thua Thien Hue Province), the total damage caused about VND 1.9 billion (US$90,000).

In Da Nang and Quảng Nam Province, Department of Education and Training at two local students have to leave school to avoid the storm. Total damage in Vietnam reached 817.91 billion dong (US$35.6 million).

=== Other areas ===
Within Laos severe flooding was reported with at least 10,000 structures damaged and economic losses reaching $61 million. The depression also produced heavy rainfall, within north-eastern, central and eastern parts of Thailand. Flash flooding was reported within the provinces of Kamphang Phet, Tak, Nan, Phetchabun, Phitsanulok, Khon Kaen, Ubon Ratchathani, Surin, Si Sa Ket, Nakhon Ratchasima, Amnat Charoen, Buri Ram, Nakhon Sawan, Lop Buri, Kanchanaburi, Sa Kaeo, Prachin Buri and Nakhon Nayok.

== Aftermath ==
Many meteorology departments stated that the system was a tropical depression, but the Vietnamese Meteorological and Hydrological Administration would state that the system had peaked as a tropical storm.

Mr. Bui Minh Tang confirms Da Nang city for the entire school students after the storm ends because of the Center's newsletter afternoon September 18 is reasonable, because this time there's heavy rain, but on 19 September is back to school "bit careful".

== See also ==
- Weather of 2013
- Tropical cyclones in 2013
- Typhoon Xangsane (2006)
- September 2009 Vietnam tropical depression
- Typhoon Ketsana (2009)
- Tropical Storm Vamco (2015)
- Tropical Storm Rai (2016)
- Tropical Storm Sinlaku (2020)
