= 2016 Pacific typhoon season =

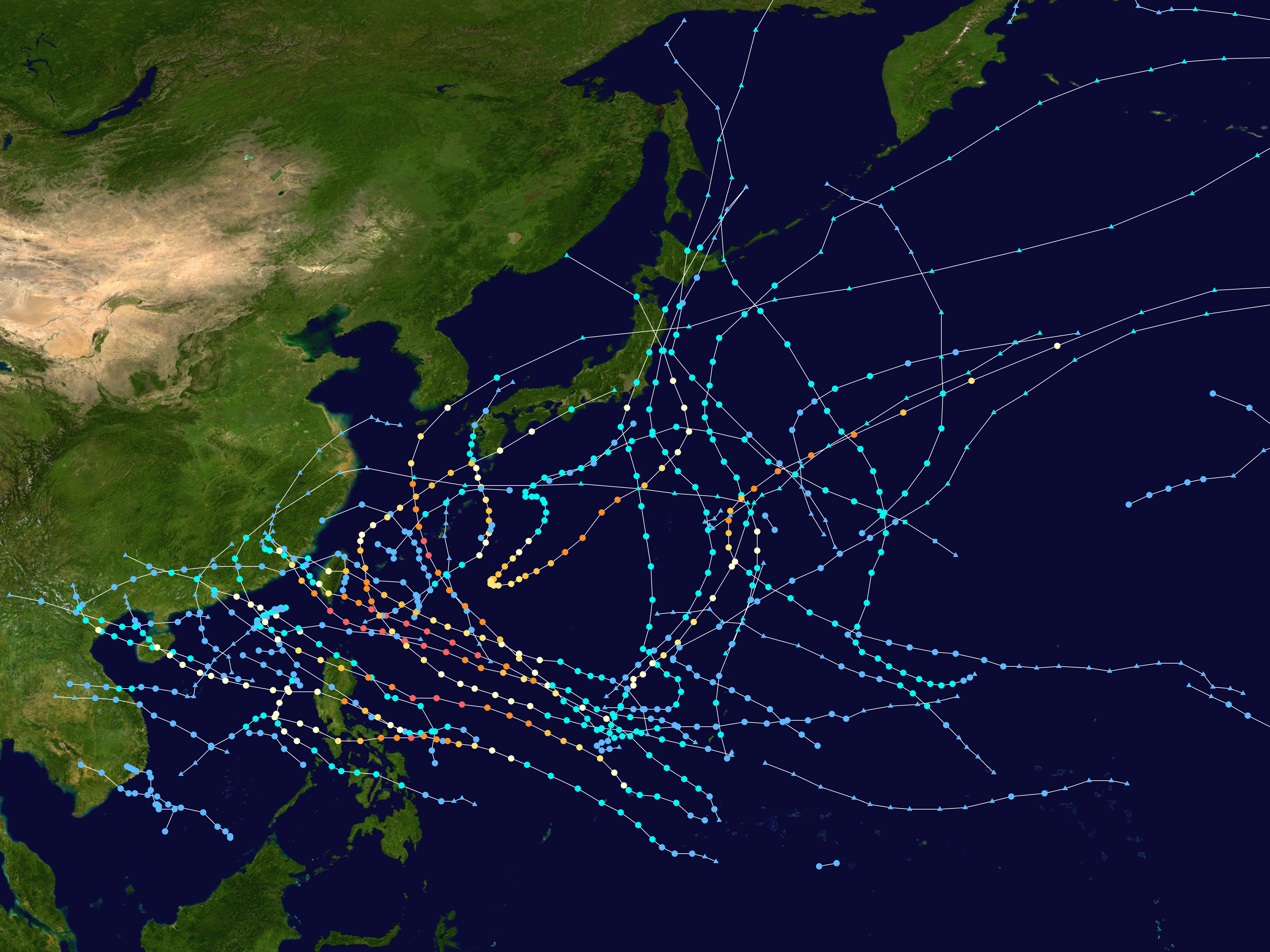
- Season summary map

Seasonal boundaries
- First system formed: May 25, 2016
- Last system dissipated: December 28, 2016

Strongest storm
- Name: Meranti
  - Maximum winds: 220 km/h (140 mph) (10-minute sustained)
  - Lowest pressure: 890 hPa (mbar)

Seasonal statistics
- Total depressions: 51
- Total storms: 26
- Typhoons: 13
- Very strong typhoons: 10
- Violent typhoons: 5
- Total fatalities: 942 total
- Total damage: $16.96 billion (2016 USD)

Related articles
- Timeline of the 2016 Pacific typhoon season; 2016 Atlantic hurricane season; 2016 Pacific hurricane season; 2016 North Indian Ocean cyclone season

The 2016 Pacific typhoon season featured the fourth-latest start to a Pacific typhoon season since reliable records began. It was an slightly above-average season, with a total of 26 named storms, 13 typhoons, and six super typhoons. The season ran throughout 2016, though typically most tropical cyclones develop between May and November. The season's first named storm, Nepartak, developed on July 3, while the season's last named storm, Nock-ten, dissipated on December 28.

The development of Nepartak made the second-latest time within a season for the first named storm to develop and ended a 199-day period (from December 17, 2015 – July 3, 2016) during which no named storm was active in the basin. Tropical Storm Mirinae reached peak intensity while making landfall over the Red River Delta, causing very severe damage in Northern Vietnam. By the end of August, three storms had hit the Japanese island of Hokkaidō, the most since 1951. In September, Typhoon Meranti reached peak intensity with a minimum pressure of 890 hPa, becoming one of the most intense tropical cyclones on record. Typhoon Chaba became the strongest typhoon to strike South Korea since 2012. Tropical Storm Aere and a tropical depression brought the worst flooding in Vietnam since 2011. The last storm of the season, Typhoon Nock-ten, became the strongest tropical cyclone ever recorded worldwide on Christmas Day (December 25) since at least 1960, in terms of 1-minute maximum sustained winds.

The scope of this article is limited to the Pacific Ocean to the north of the equator between 100°E and 180th meridian. Within the northwestern Pacific Ocean, there are two separate agencies that assign names to tropical cyclones which can often result in a cyclone having two names. The Japan Meteorological Agency (JMA) (Note: The Japan Meteorological Agency is the official Regional Specialized Meteorological Center for the western Pacific Ocean.) will name a tropical cyclone should it be judged to have 10-minute sustained wind speeds of at least 65 km/h (40 mph) anywhere in the basin, whilst the Philippine Atmospheric, Geophysical and Astronomical Services Administration (PAGASA) assigns names to tropical cyclones which move into or form as a tropical depression in the Philippine Area of Responsibility (PAR) located between 135°E and 115°E and between 5°N–25°N regardless of whether or not a tropical cyclone has already been given a name by the JMA. Tropical depressions that are monitored by the United States' Joint Typhoon Warning Center (JTWC) (Note: The Joint Typhoon Warning Center is a joint United States Navy – United States Air Force task force that issues tropical cyclone warnings for the western Pacific Ocean and other regions.) (Note: A super typhoon is an unofficial category used by the Joint Typhoon Warning Center (JTWC) for a typhoon with winds of at least 240 km/h (150 mph).) are given a number with a "W" suffix.

== Seasonal forecasts ==
TSR forecasts Date	Tropical storms	Total Typhoons	Intense TCs	ACE	Ref
Average (1965–2015)	26	16	9	298	
May 7, 2016	22	13	6	217	
July 6, 2016	22	13	7	239	
August 8, 2016	22	13	7	231	
Other forecasts Date	Forecast Center	Period		Systems	Ref
January 8, 2016	PAGASA	January — March		1–2 tropical cyclones	
January 8, 2016	PAGASA	April — June		1–3 tropical cyclones	
June 28, 2016	CWB	January 1 — December 31		19–23 tropical storms	
July 15, 2016	PAGASA	July — September		5–11 tropical cyclones	
July 15, 2016	PAGASA	October — December		4–9 tropical cyclones	
	Forecast Center	Tropical cyclones	Tropical storms	Typhoons	Ref
Actual activity:	JMA	51	26	13	
Actual activity:	JTWC	30	26	17	
Actual activity:	PAGASA	14	13	9	

During the year several national meteorological services and scientific agencies forecast how many tropical cyclones, tropical storms, and typhoons will form during a season and/or how many tropical cyclones will affect a particular country. These agencies included the Tropical Storm Risk (TSR) Consortium of University College London, PAGASA and Taiwan's Central Weather Bureau. Some of the forecasts took into consideration what happened in previous seasons and the El Niño conditions that were observed during the previous year. The first forecast of the year was released by PAGASA during January 2016, within its seasonal climate outlook for the period January – June. The outlook noted that one to two tropical cyclones were expected between January and March, while one to three were expected to develop or enter the Philippine Area of Responsibility between April and June.

During March the Hong Kong Observatory predicted that the typhoon season in Hong Kong would be near-normal, with four to seven tropical cyclones passing within 500 km (310 mi) of the territory compared to an average of six, which was revised to five to eight tropical cyclones in August. On May 7, Tropical Storm Risk issued its first forecast for the season and predicted that it will be a quiet season, with 22 tropical storms, 13 typhoons, and 6 intense typhoons developing during the year, while an ACE Index of 217 was also forecast. Ahead of the Thailand rainy season starting during May, the Thai Meteorological Department predicted that two tropical cyclones would move near Thailand during 2016. They predicted that there was a high chance that the first tropical cyclone would move past northern and north-eastern Thailand during August or September. The second tropical cyclone was predicted to move past Southern Thailand during October and November. On June 28, Taiwan's Central Weather Bureau predicted that between 19 and 23 tropical storms would develop over the basin, while two — four systems were expected to affect Taiwan itself.

On July 6, TSR released their second forecast for the season. They predicted mostly the same numbers as the previous forecast, but raised the number of intense typhoons to 7. PAGASA issued their second and final forecast for the year on July 15, within its seasonal climate outlook for the period July – December. The outlook noted that between five and eleven tropical cyclones were expected between July and September, while four to nine were expected to develop or enter the Philippine Area of Responsibility between October and December. TSR issued their final forecast for the season on August 8, sustaining the tropical cyclone numbers, however its ACE was slightly lowered than the previous forecast.

== Season summary ==
Costliest known Pacific typhoon seasons
Rank	Total damages	Season
1	$38.54 billion	2019
2	$38.06 billion	2023
3	$30.59 billion	2018
4	$29.62 billion	2024
5	$26.45 billion	2013
6	$21.05 billion	2012
7	$18.77 billion	2004
8	$17.44 billion	1991
9	$17.18 billion	2000
10	$16.96 billion	2016

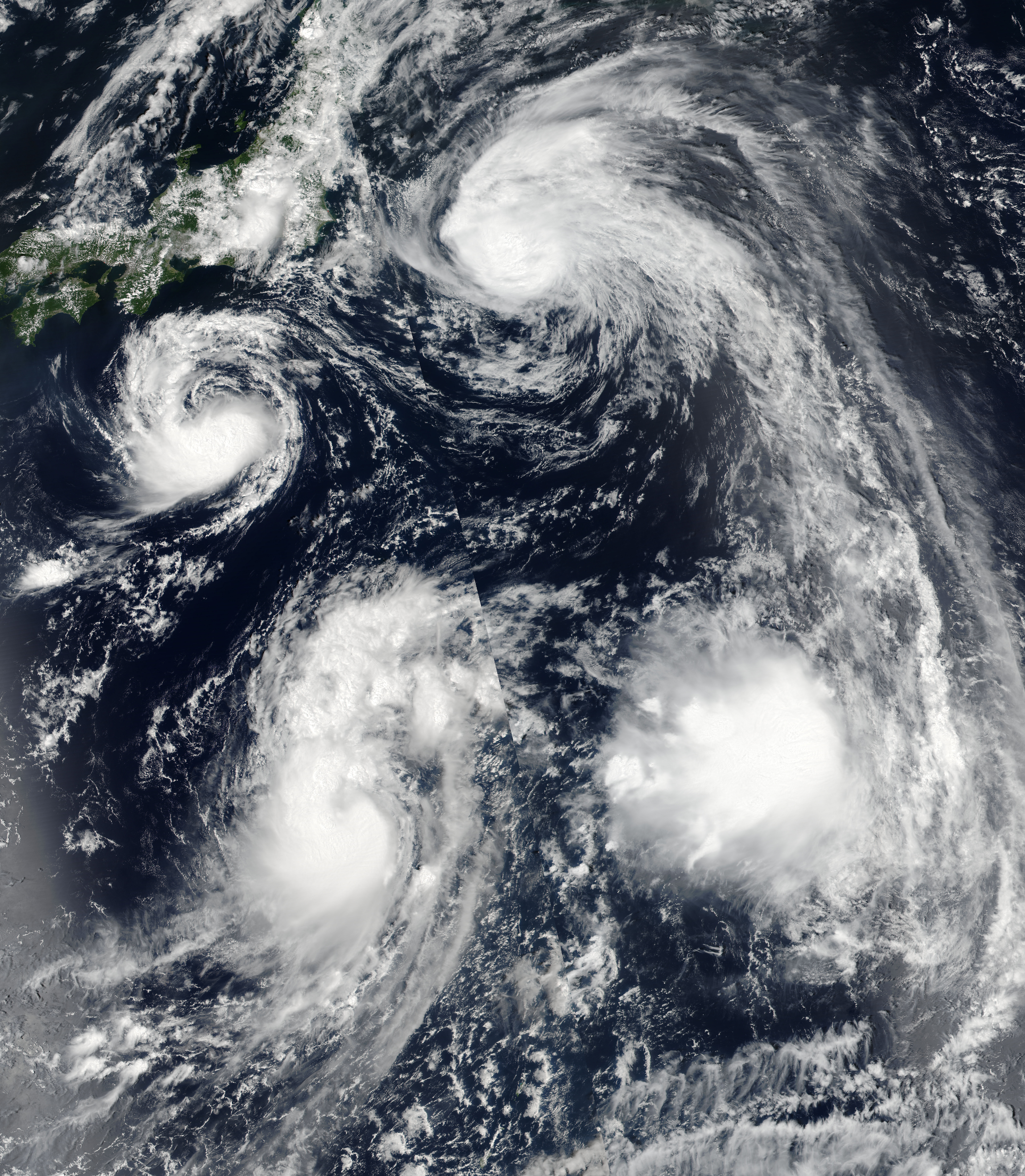
A trio of storms southeast of Japan on August 20; Lionrock (left), Mindulle (bottom-left) and Kompasu (top)

Despite the season's late start, the 2016 season was a normal and active season with a total of 53 tropical depressions, of which 26 became tropical storms. After five months of inactivity, the first tropical depression developed on May 26, making it the fifth-latest season for a system to form. According to existing records only four other seasons started later—the 1973, 1983, 1984, and 1998 seasons. Tropical activity throughout the basin became marginally favorable for development, and two tropical depressions developed during June. On July 3, Nepartak became the first named tropical storm, making it the second-latest first named storm on record. Nepartak's naming ended a 199-day period (from December 17, 2015, to July 2, 2016) during which no named storm was active within the basin; this period tied the 199-day period from December 22, 1997, to July 8, 1998. Nepartak reached Category 5 super typhoon intensity before making landfall in Taiwan and East China, causing a total of US$1.52 billion of damage. In late July, Tropical Storm Mirinae reached its peak intensity while making landfall over Red River Delta in Northern Vietnam. The storm caused a total of US$334 million of damage (Note: All damage totals are valued as of 2016 and in United States dollars, unless otherwise noted.) in Hainan and Vietnam. Later, Nida reached near typhoon strength; it affected the Philippines, South China and Vietnam, but its damage was lower than that of Mirinae. The season became more active in August, with 7 named storms. Except Dianmu, which affected South China, Indochina, all of the tropical cyclones in August affected Japan and the Russian Far East. By the end of August, three storms (Chanthu, Lionrock and Kompasu) had hit the Japanese island of Hokkaidō, the most since 1951. Lionrock was a large, powerful, long-lived and erratic tropical cyclone which caused significant flooding and casualties in North Korea and Japan in late August.

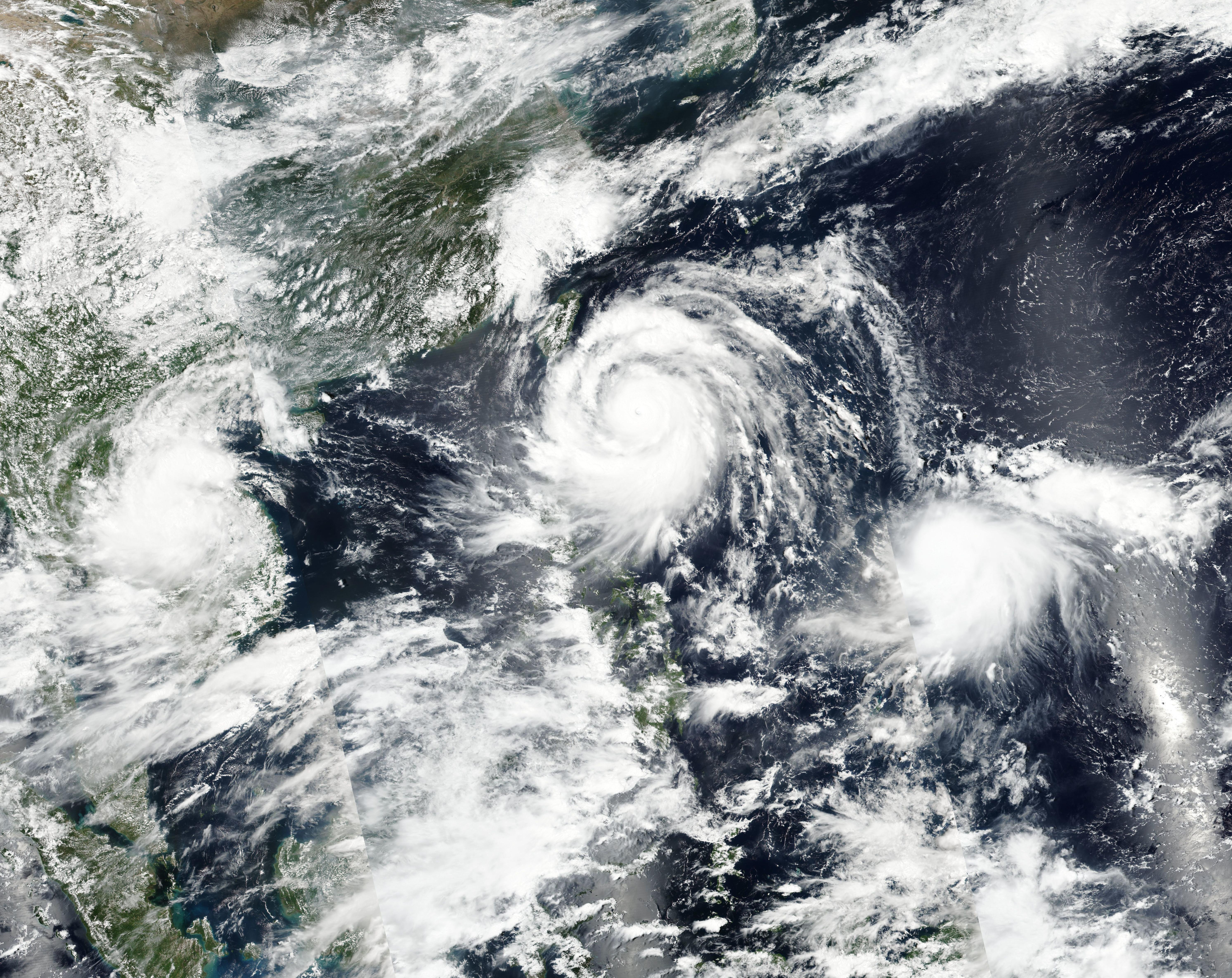
Three storms active during September 13: Rai (left), Meranti (center) and Malakas (right)

In September, Typhoon Meranti became the strongest typhoon in terms of pressure since Typhoon Megi in 2010, as well as the strongest typhoon in terms of sustained winds since Typhoon Haiyan in 2013, and the second-strongest tropical cyclone worldwide in 2016, only behind Cyclone Winston, in terms of pressure. Typhoon Megi reached its peak intensity as a Category 3 typhoon while making landfall over Taiwan. Both Meranti and Megi made landfall in Fujian, China, and they caused a total of US$3.6 billion of damage. Rai became a weak tropical storm before it made landfall in Vietnam, Laos and Thailand in mid-September, causing flooding and moderate damage. Typhoon Malakas impacted Japan with a total of nearly $740 million of damage as a Category 4 typhoon. In late September and early October, Typhoon Chaba reached Category 5 super typhoon intensity and became the strongest tropical cyclone to make landfall in South Korea since Sanba in 2012. Chaba also caused 7 deaths in the country. A tropical depression formed east of the International Date Line on October 3, and entered the basin before developing into Typhoon Songda. Songda struck the Pacific Northwest region of the United States and Canada as a powerful extratropical cyclone. Severe Tropical Storm Aere affected parts of Southeast Asia in mid-October, including the worst flooding in Vietnam since 2010, causing a total of US$209 million of damage. Later, Typhoon Sarika became a powerful typhoon, and affected the Philippines, China and Vietnam, causing severe damage as well as severe flooding in southern China. After Sarika, Typhoon Haima reached Category 5 super typhoon strength before impacting the Philippines and China, causing a total of US$1.93 billion in damages. Haima was the most severe tropical cyclone to affect Hong Kong in October since 1995. In early November, a tropical depression made landfall in Southern Vietnam and caused heavy flooding throughout central and southern Vietnam, causing moderate damage. In late December, Nock-ten became the strongest Christmas tropical cyclone on record anywhere in the world since at least 1960 in terms of 1-minute sustained winds, before impacting the Philippines.

The Accumulated Cyclone Energy (ACE) index for the 2016 Pacific typhoon season as calculated by Colorado State University using data from the Joint Typhoon Warning Center was 261.9 units. Broadly speaking, ACE is a measure of the power of a tropical or subtropical storm multiplied by the length of time it existed. It is only calculated for full advisories on specific tropical and subtropical systems reaching or exceeding wind speeds of 39 miles per hour (63 km/h).

== Systems ==
=== Tropical Depression 01W ===
- Tropical depression (JMA)
- Tropical depression (SSHWS)
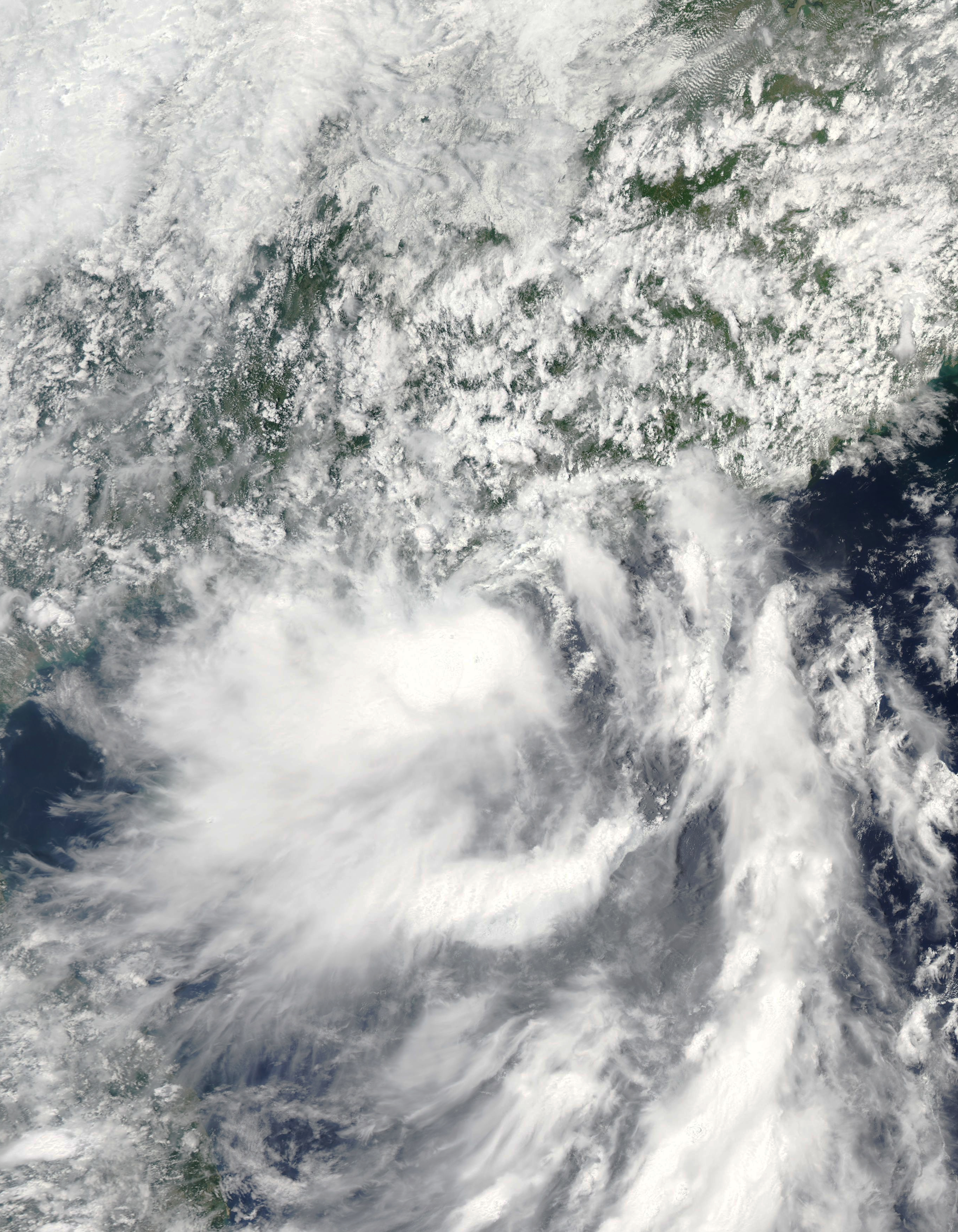
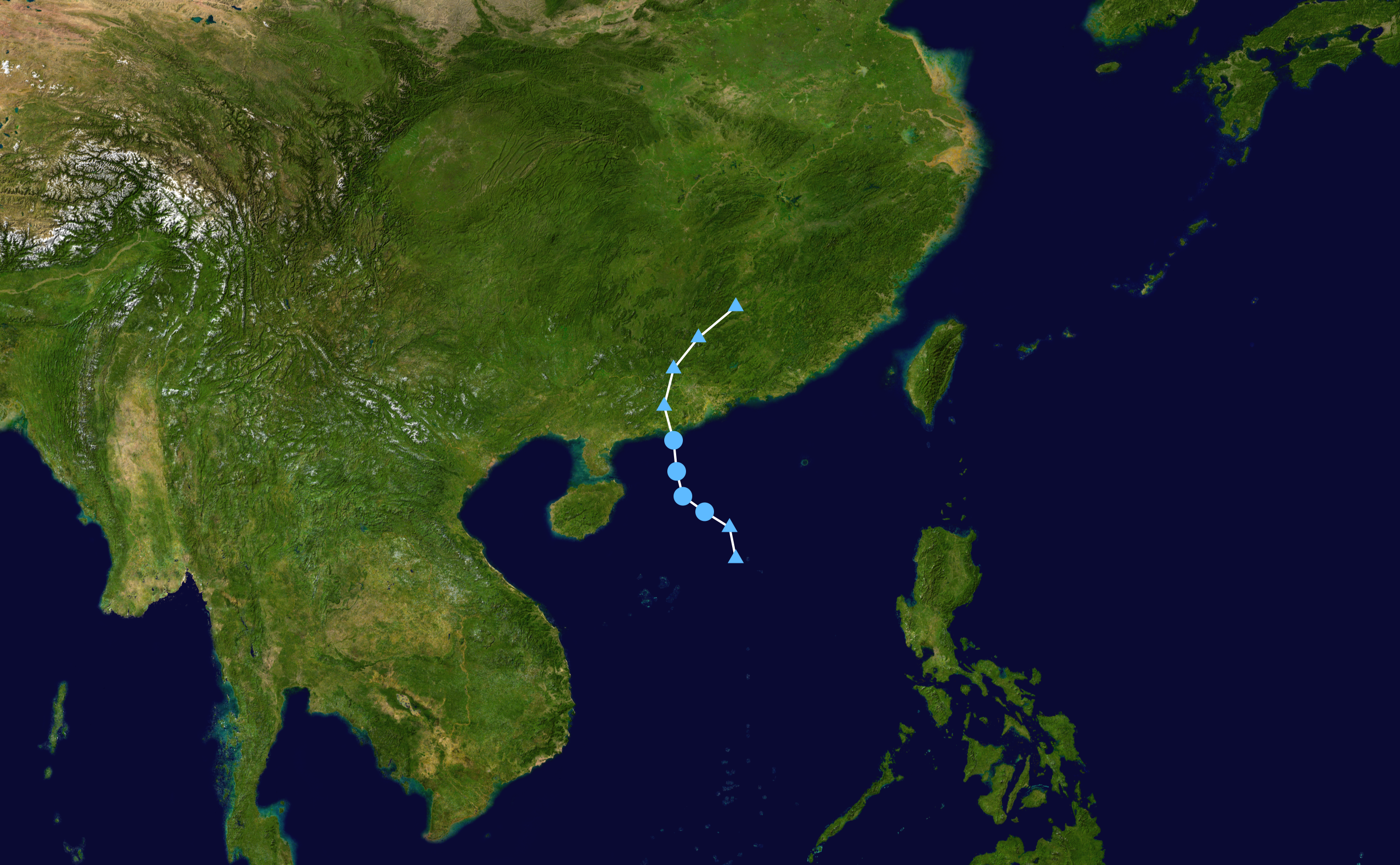
- Duration: May 25 – May 27
- Peak intensity: <55 km/h (35 mph) (10-min); 1000 hPa (mbar)

During May 25, Tropical Depression 01W developed over the northern South China Sea, about 600 km (375 mi) to the south of Hong Kong, China. The system subsequently moved north-westwards and slightly developed further, before it made landfall near Yangjiang in Guangdong, China during the next day. The system subsequently quickly weakened and degenerated into an area of low pressure during May 27.

The system brought squally and heavy rain to the Pearl River Delta, including parts of Hong Kong, Macau and Guangdong province, where a bridge was destroyed by flooding and two people were injured. At the Macau Ferry Terminal, two passengers were injured as a vessel collided with the terminal, while there was no significant damage reported within Hong Kong. Damage in China were at CN¥60 million (US$9.14 million).

=== Tropical Depression Ambo ===
- Tropical depression (JMA)
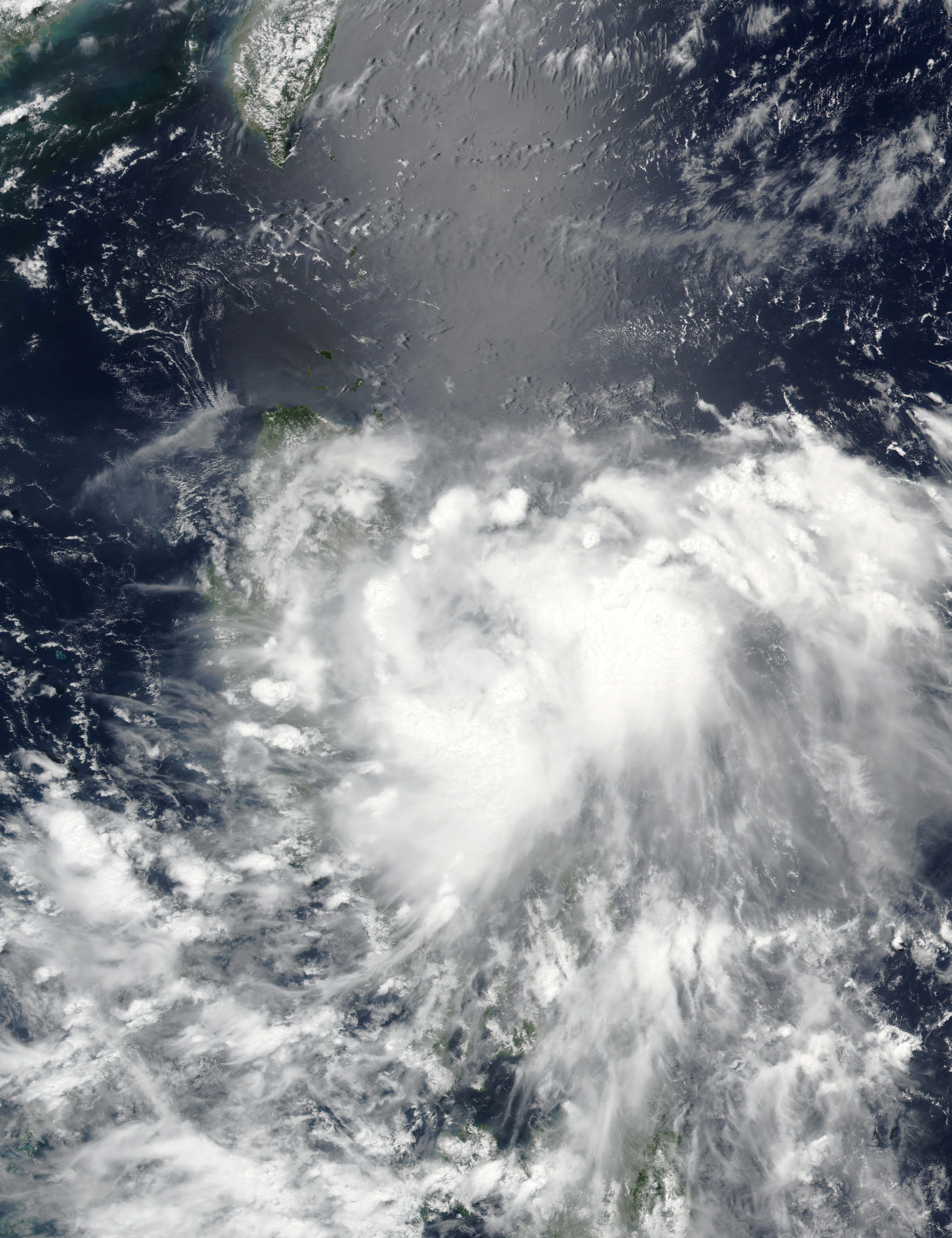
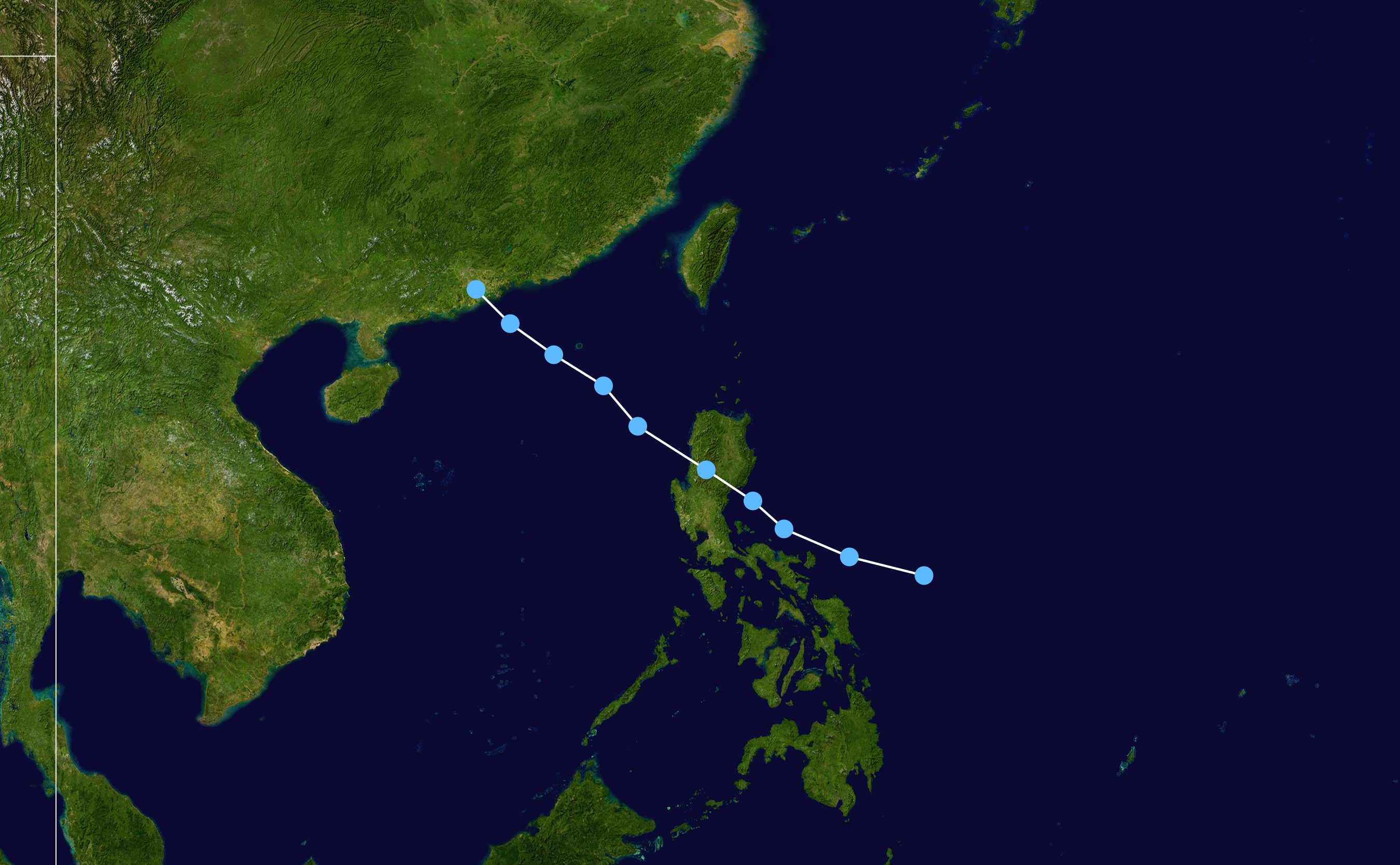
- Duration: June 25 – June 28
- Peak intensity: 55 km/h (35 mph) (10-min); 1004 hPa (mbar)

Early on June 26, the JMA and PAGASA reported that Tropical Depression Ambo had developed over the Philippine Sea, about 555 km (345 mi) to the east of Manila on the island of Luzon in the Philippines. The system was located within an environment that was thought to be favourable for further development, with low vertical wind shear and a fair outflow. However, the depression's broad low level circulation centre was moving north-westwards quickly, which meant that the circulation's southern edge could not close off and was exposed. The system subsequently made landfall on Luzon in Philippines later that day, where according to PAGASA it quickly weakened into a low-pressure area. However, the JMA continued to monitor the system as a tropical depression throughout June 27, as it emerged into an unfavourable environment for further development in the South China Sea. The depression subsequently made landfall on China's Guangdong Province, before it was last noted during June 28, as it dissipated over land.

Several sea-trips in the Philippine island province of Catanduanes were cancelled with a total of seven passengers, three rolling cargoes and a sea vessel stranded at the port of Virac.

=== Typhoon Nepartak (Butchoy) ===
- Violent typhoon (JMA)
- Category 5 super typhoon (SSHWS)
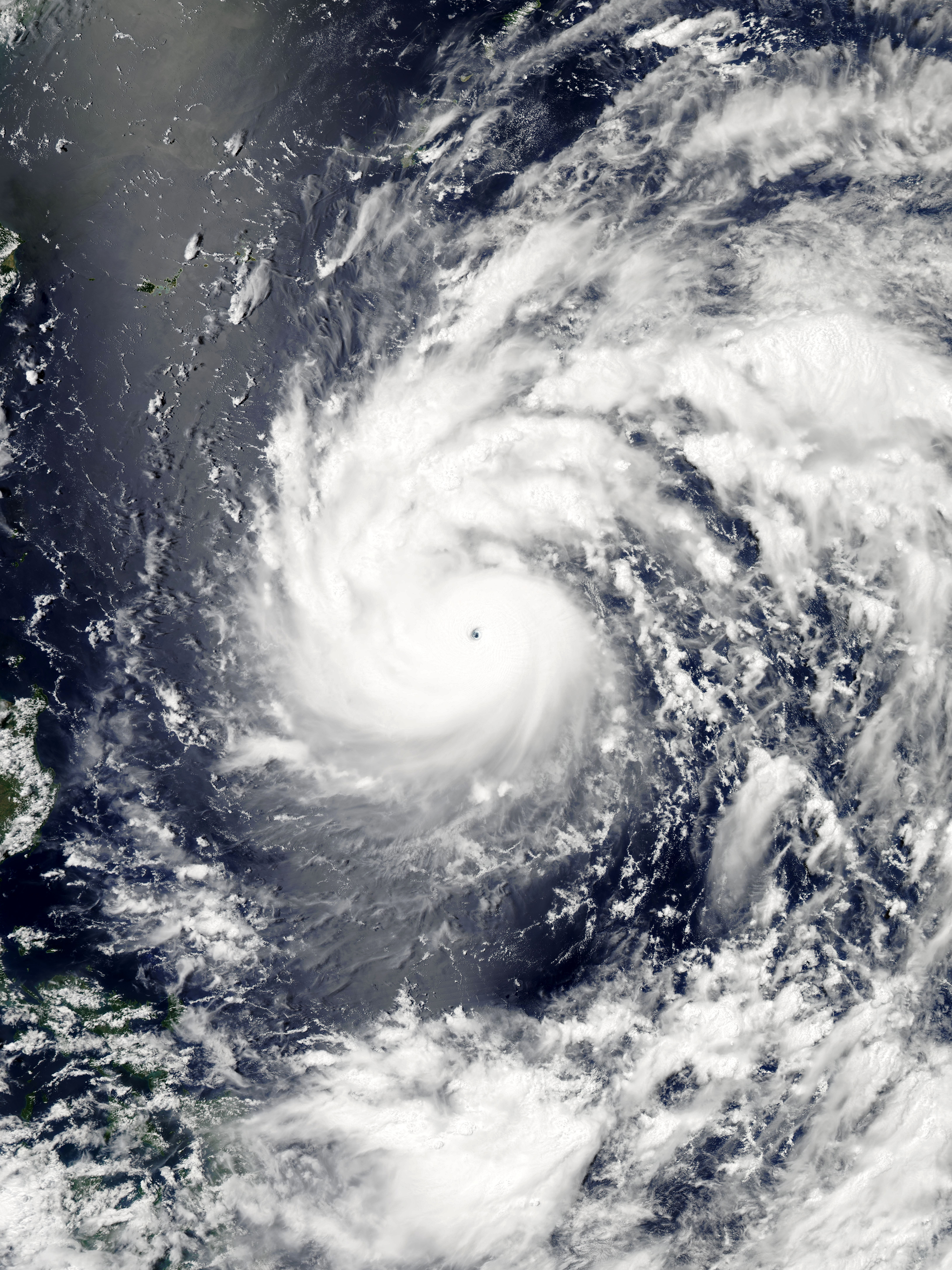
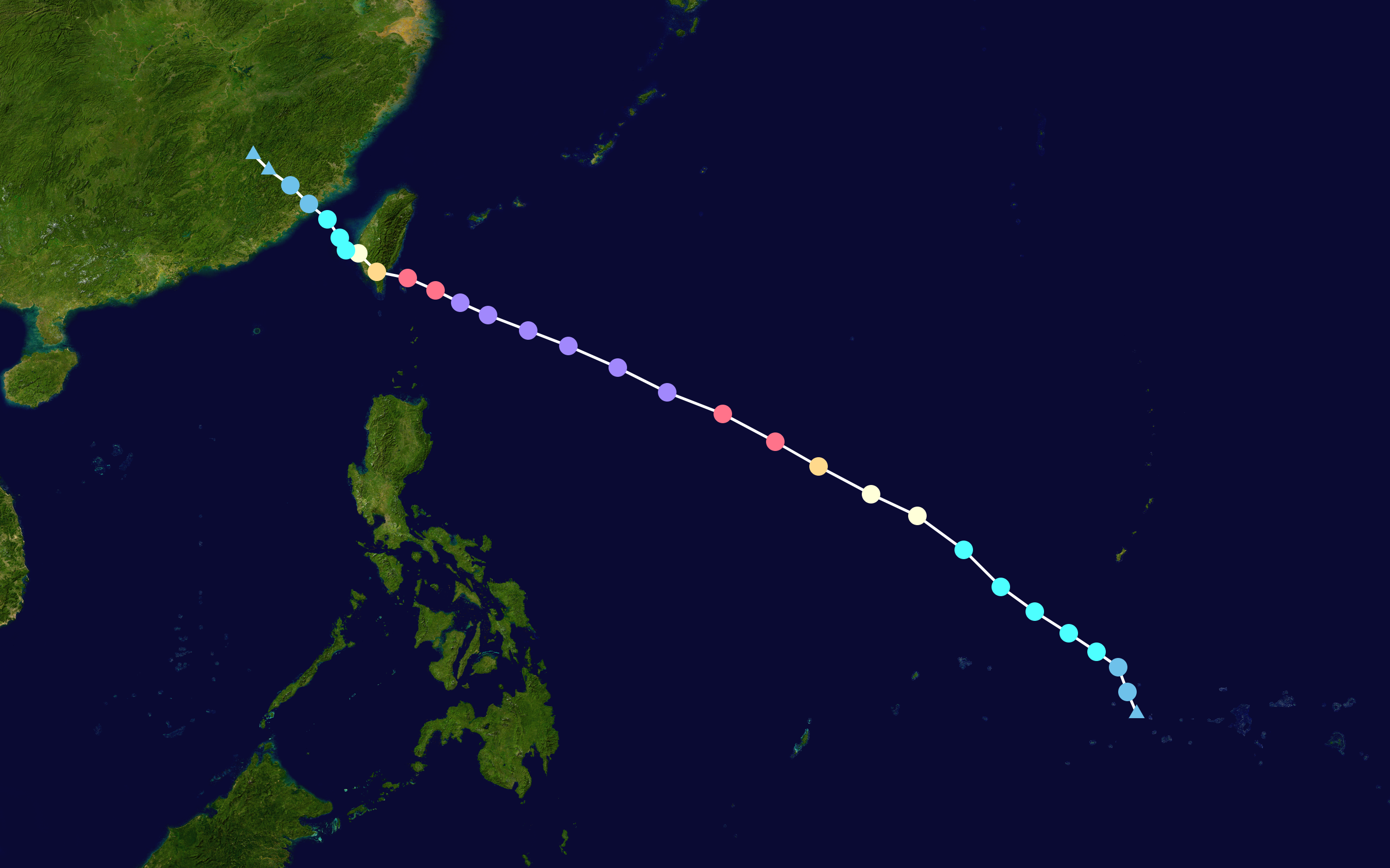
- Duration: July 2 – July 10
- Peak intensity: 205 km/h (125 mph) (10-min); 900 hPa (mbar)

On July 2, a tropical depression formed 780 km (480 mi) to the southeast of Yap State. The following day, the depression became a tropical storm, receiving the name Nepartak. By July 4, organization increased and Nepartak intensified into a severe tropical storm. At that time, PAGASA assigned the local name Butchoy as it entered their area of responsibility. Early on July 5, Nepartak started to undergo rapid intensification, reaching typhoon strength. Nepartak soon reached Category 5 super typhoon intensity. (Note: Tropical cyclones reaching Category 3 (111 miles per hour or 179 kilometers per hour) and higher on the five-level Saffir–Simpson wind speed scale are considered major hurricanes.) During the course of July 6, Nepartak reached its peak intensity with 10-minute sustained winds of 205 km/h (125 mph) and a minimum barometric pressure of 900 mbar. Nepartak started weakening during the next day, before making landfall in Taitung City on July 8. Nepartak weakened to a tropical storm as it made its second landfall in Shishi, Fujian. Nepartak rapidly deteriorated over land and fully dissipated on July 10.

Two people drowned on July 7 after being washed out to sea by strong winds in Taiwan. A total of seven major highways were damaged in Taiwan, too. At least 10 people were killed and 11 others were reported missing across Fujian and Jiangxi. At least 3,144 homes were destroyed and 15,800 hectares (39,000 acres) of crops were damaged; total economic losses reached ¥2.2 billion (US$320 million). Overall, Nepartak killed a total of 86 people, mostly from Fujian Province, and caused a total of ¥9.99 billion (US$1.49 billion) of damage.

=== Tropical Depression 03W ===
- Tropical depression (JMA)
- Tropical depression (SSHWS)
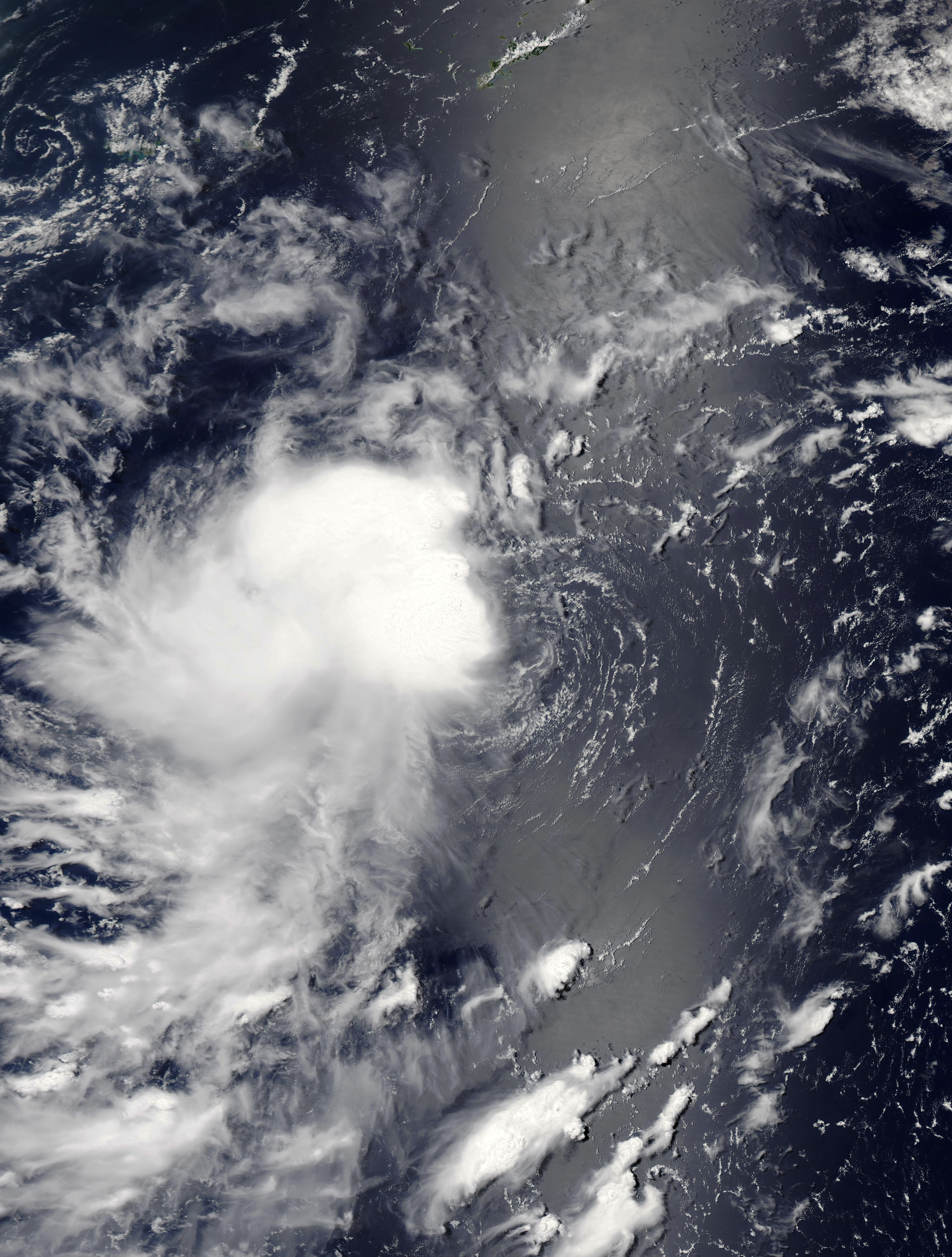
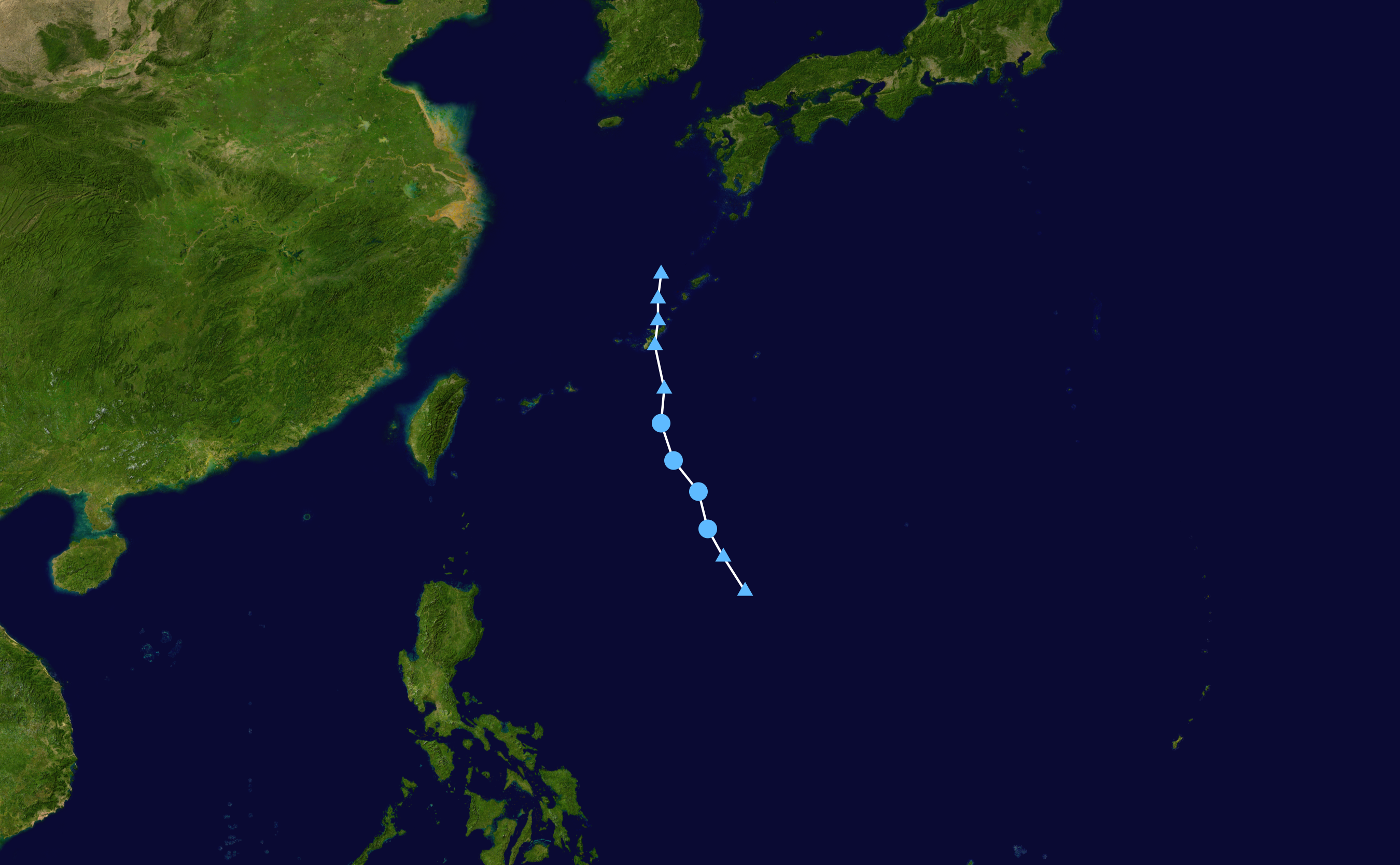
- Duration: July 15 – July 20
- Peak intensity: 55 km/h (35 mph) (10-min); 1006 hPa (mbar)

During July 14, a tropical disturbance developed about 400 km (250 mi) to the west-northwest of Guam. At this time atmospheric convection surrounding the system was flaring, over the system's weak but developing low level circulation center. However, as a subtropical ridge of high pressure extended a significant amount of dry air over the disturbance, conditions were assessed to be marginally favorable for further development of the system. Over the next couple of days the system gradually developed further as it moved north-westwards and was classified as a tropical depression by the JMA during July 15. After the system had consolidated further, it was classified as Tropical Depression 03W by the JTWC during July 17. However, the system weakened during that day as it moved polewards, along the western edge of the subtropical ridge of high pressure, into an area of increasing vertical wind shear. As a result, the JTWC expected the system to quickly dissipate and issued their final advisory later that day. However, over the next couple of days the system continued to move northwards and impacted the Ryukyu Islands, before it was last noted by the JMA during July 20.

=== Tropical Storm Lupit ===
- Tropical storm (JMA)
- Tropical storm (SSHWS)
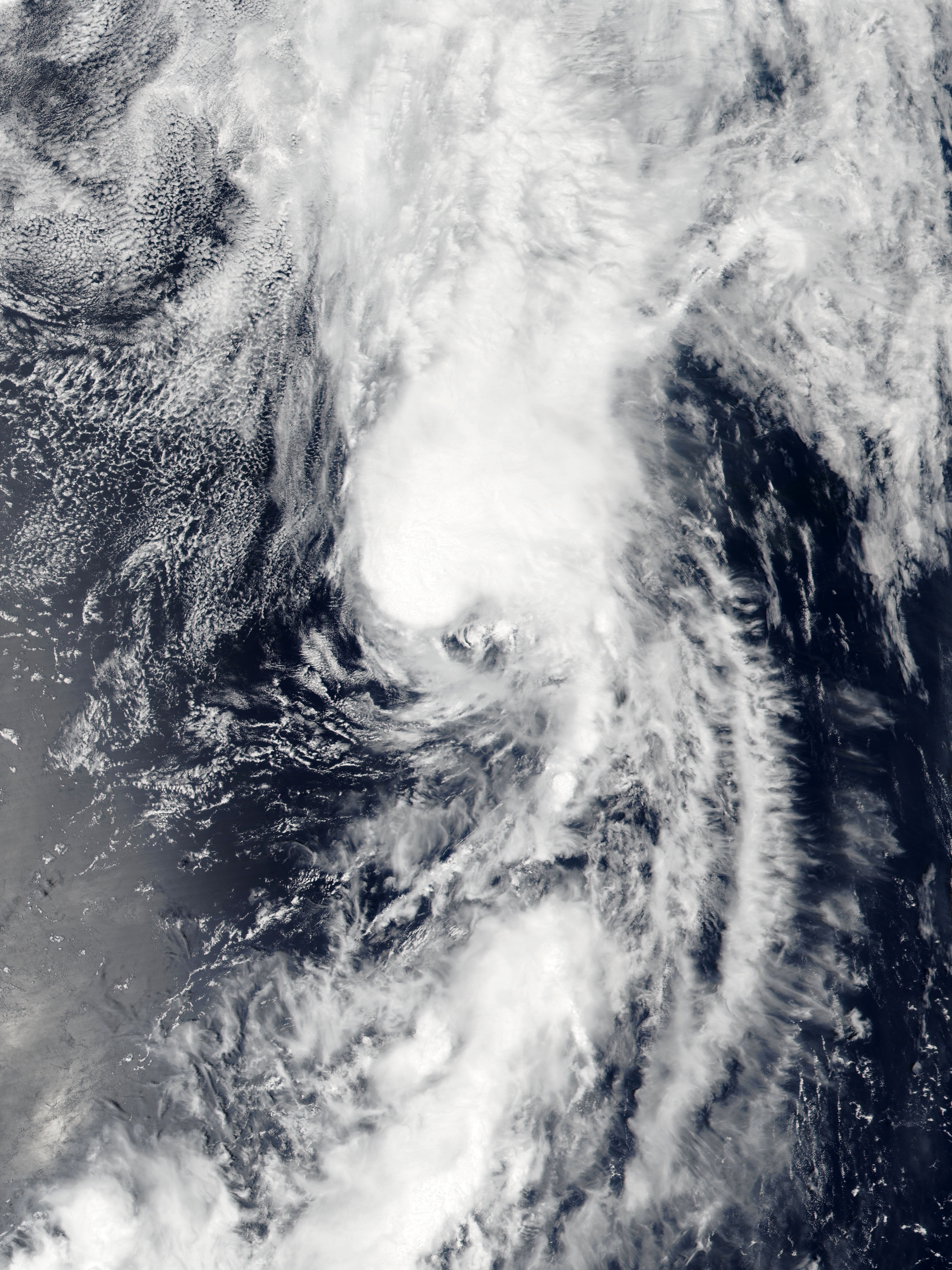
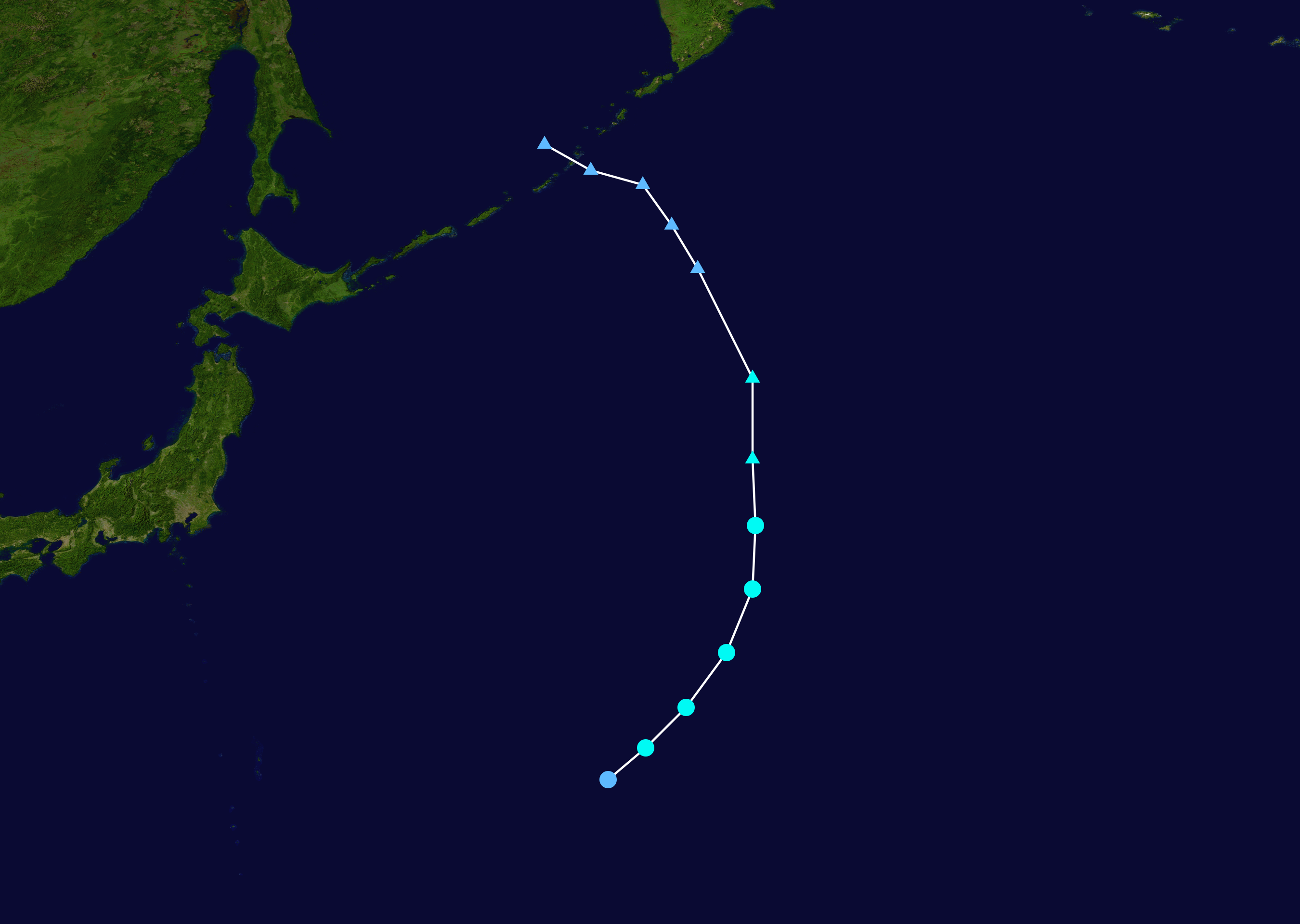
- Duration: July 22 – July 24
- Peak intensity: 75 km/h (45 mph) (10-min); 1000 hPa (mbar)

During July 21, a subtropical disturbance developed at the tailend of a mid-latitude trough of low pressure, about 775 km (480 mi) to the east of Iwo-To. Over the next day, deep atmospheric convection developed over the system's elongated low level circulation center, before it was classified as a tropical depression by the JMA during July 22. Over the next day, as the storm moved north-northeastwards around a subtropical ridge of high pressure, its structure improved as it developed a warm core and consolidated. The hybrid system was subsequently classified as Tropical Storm 04W by the JTWC during July 23, before the JMA named it Lupit later that day. Over the next day, Lupit peaked with sustained winds of 75 km/h (47 mph), as it went through an extratropical transition and took on frontal characteristics. Lupit subsequently became extratropical during July 24, before it dissipated during July 26, as it moved into the Sea of Okhotsk.

=== Severe Tropical Storm Mirinae ===
- Severe tropical storm (JMA)
- Category 1 typhoon (SSHWS)
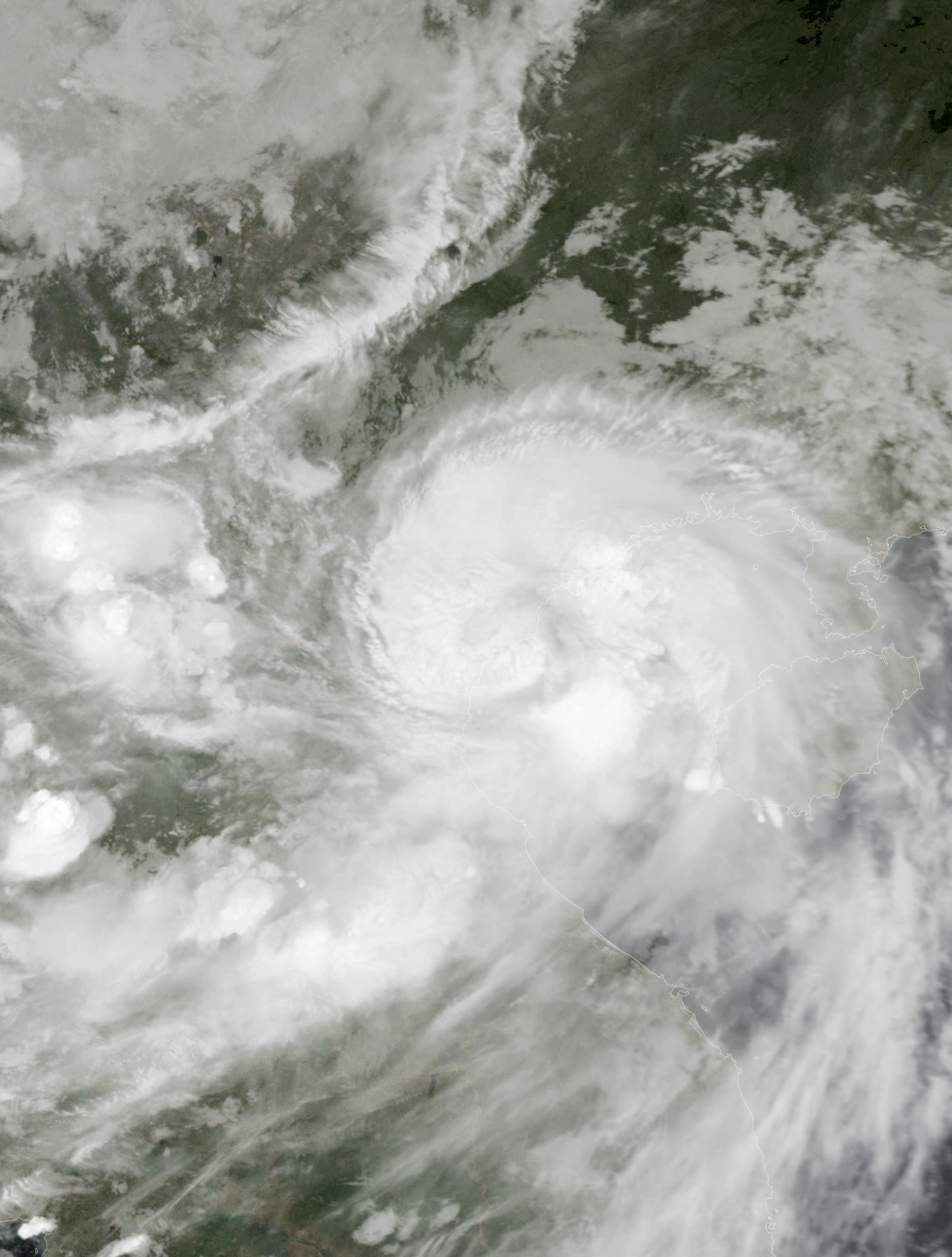
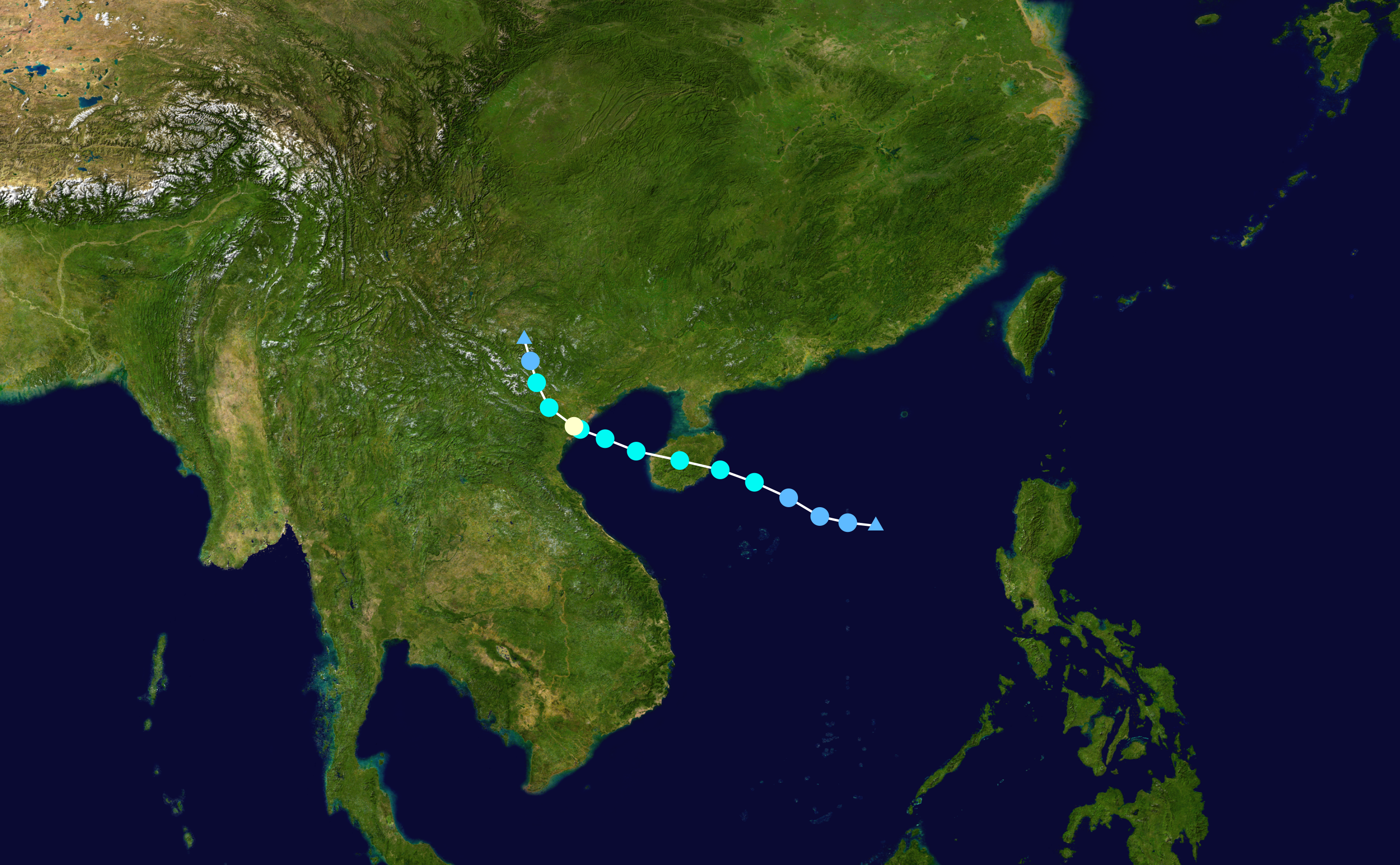
- Duration: July 25 – July 28
- Peak intensity: 100 km/h (65 mph) (10-min); 980 hPa (mbar)

Mirinae was first noted as a tropical depression during July 25, as it moved off the west coast of Luzon into the South China Sea, about 300 km (185 mi) to the east of the Paracel Islands. The next day, it was named Mirinae after it became a tropical storm. Mirinae subsequently weakened slightly as it made landfall later that day, near Wanning and crossed Hainan Island. It re-intensified on moving into the Gulf of Tonkin. The system reached its peak intensity as a severe tropical storm on July 27, with 10-minute sustained winds of 95 km/h (59 mph). The system made landfall about 110 km (70 mi) to the south of Hanoi in northern Vietnam later that day. Mirinae subsequently weakened gradually over northern Vietnam, before it dissipated to the north of Hanoi. On mainland Vietnam, a weather station in Văn Lý (Nam Định) recorded sustained winds of 119 km/h (74 mph) with gusts reaching 144 km/h (89 mph), while another station in Ba Lạt (Thái Bình) recorded wind gusts of 169 km/h (105 mph).

In Hainan, economic losses caused by the storm reached 300 million yuan (US$45 million). By July 29, the storm had left five people dead and five others missing in Vietnam. Severe damage to infrastructure was reported in Northern Vietnam, with damage to power lines causing blackouts and power cuts in some areas. Mirinae also sank 12 boats, destroyed the roofs of 1,425 houses and uprooted about 5,000 trees. Damages in Vietnam amounted to ₫7.229 trillion ($323.9 million).

=== Severe Tropical Storm Nida (Carina) ===
- Severe tropical storm (JMA)
- Category 1 typhoon (SSHWS)
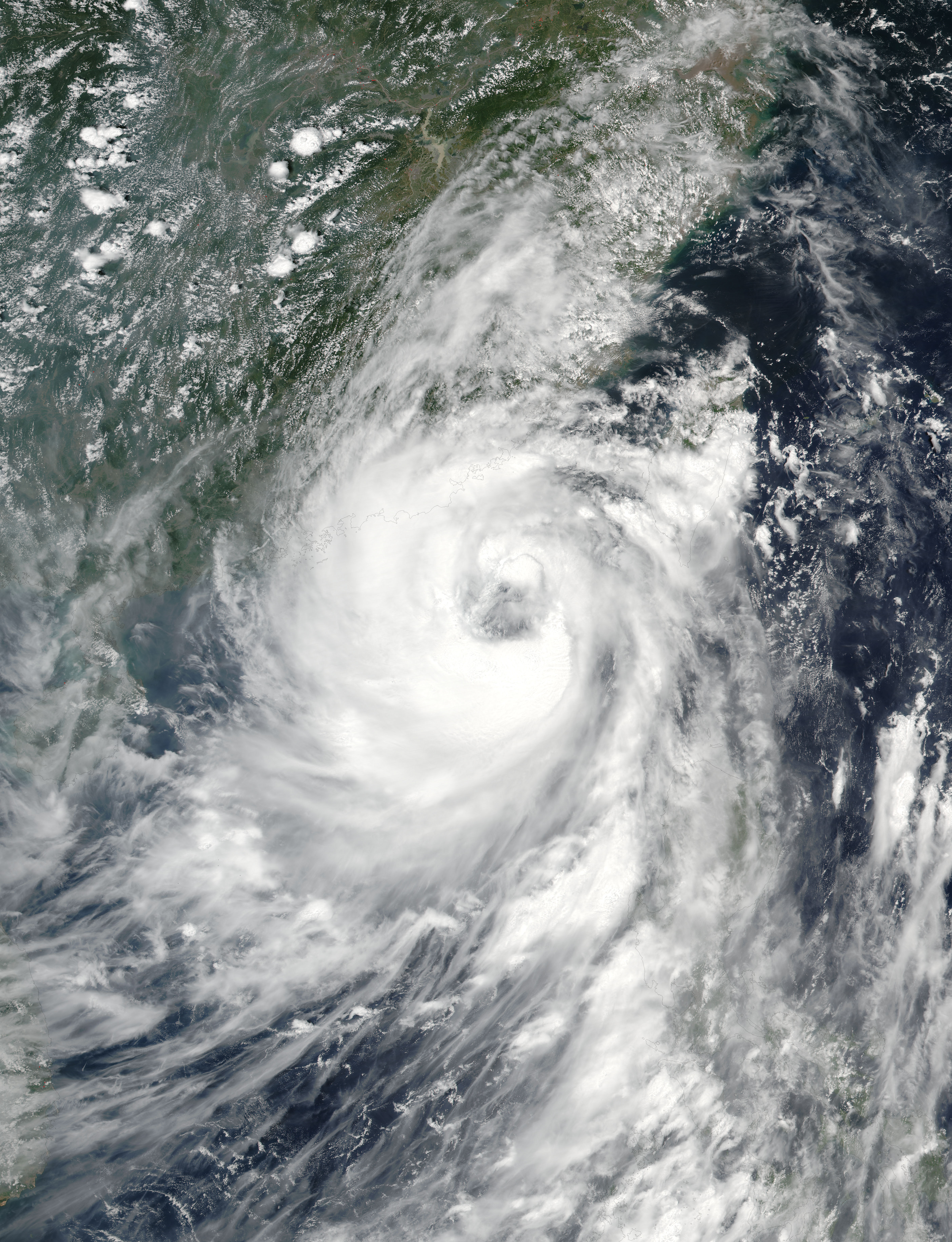
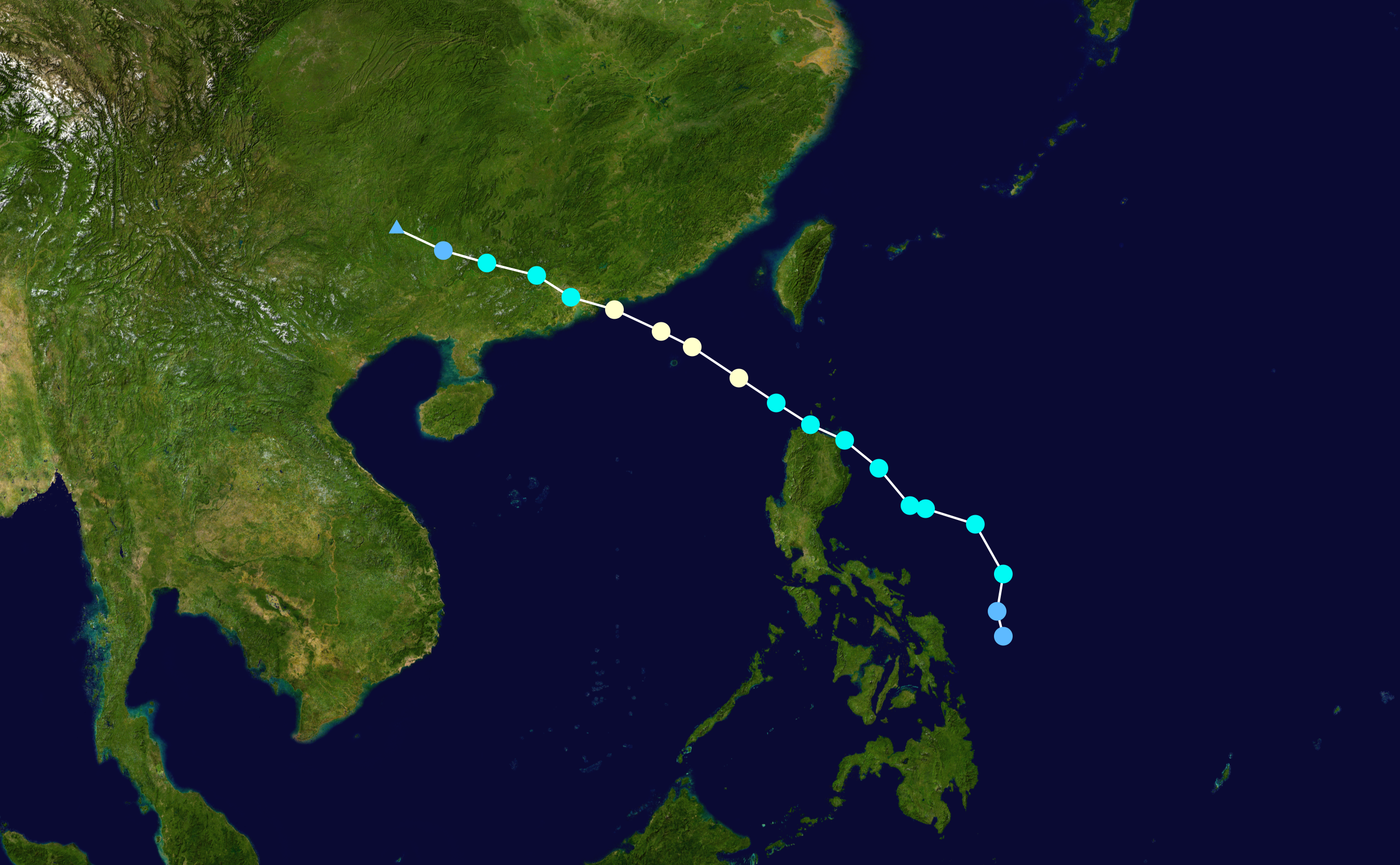
- Duration: July 29 – August 3
- Peak intensity: 110 km/h (70 mph) (10-min); 975 hPa (mbar)

During July 28, a tropical depression developed about 1,020 km (635 mi) to the east-southeast of Manila in the Philippines. Over the next day as the system moved north-northwestwards under the influence of a subtropical ridge of high pressure, deep convection started wrapping into the system's low level circulation center. During that day PAGASA assigned the local name Carina.

On July 31, Nida made landfall over the area between Baggao and Gattaran of the Cagayan province in the Philippines at 13:20 PST (05:20 UTC) as a severe tropical storm. At 03:35 CST on August 2 (19:35 UTC on August 1), Nida made landfall over Dapeng Peninsula of Shenzhen, Guangdong, China as a severe tropical storm.

While it lashes the Northeastern part of the Philippines, the provinces of Isabela, Cagayan, Quirino Province, Abra, Mt. Province, Benguet, Kalinga Province, and Ifugao Province reported that some of their major roads was not passable due to landslides. Despite the local governments of the said areas reported that there are no casualties, they still reported that some of them are injured during the typhoon. Damages in Ilocos Norte were estimated at ₱19.38 million (US$411,000).

=== Severe Tropical Storm Omais ===
- Severe tropical storm (JMA)
- Category 1 typhoon (SSHWS)
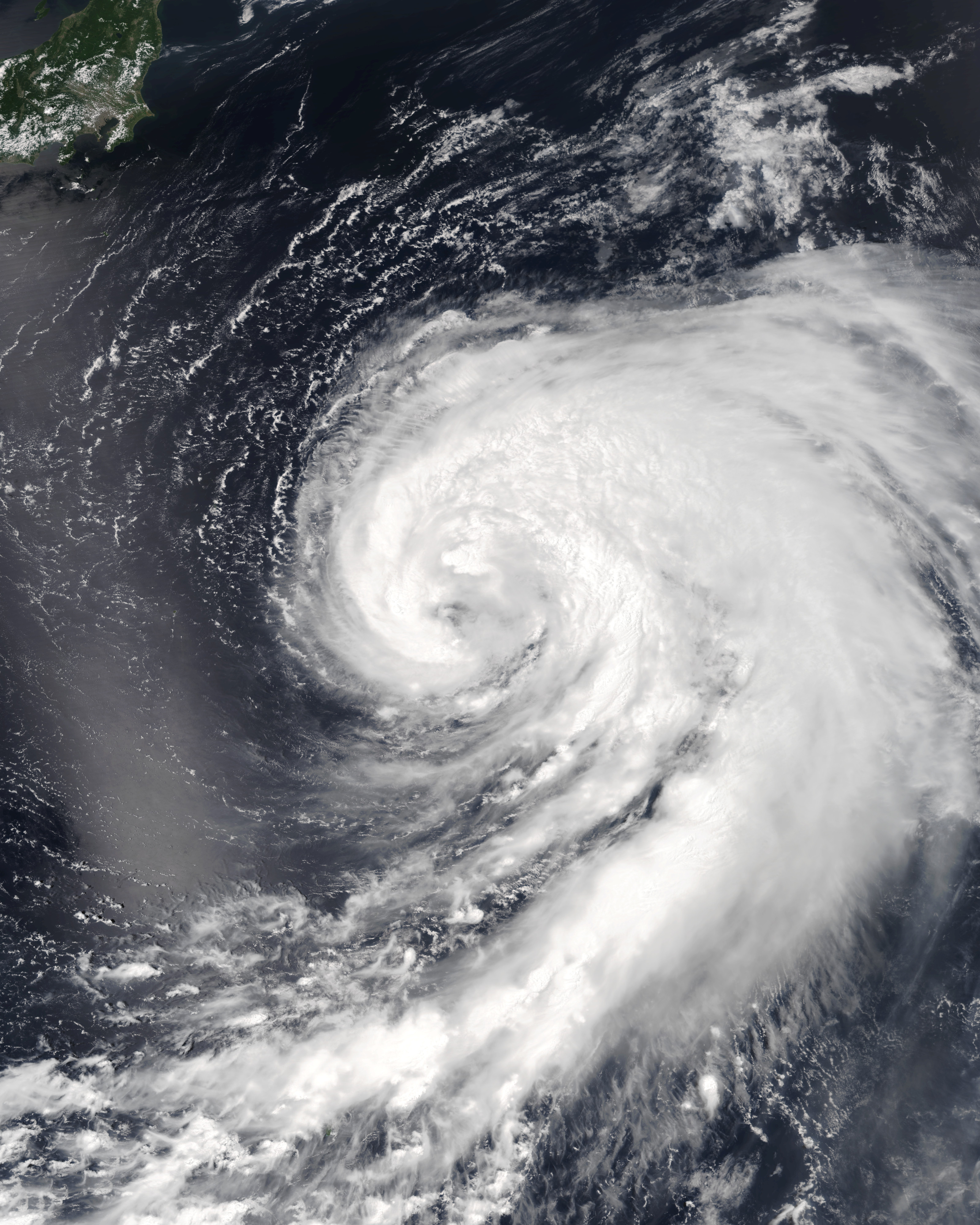
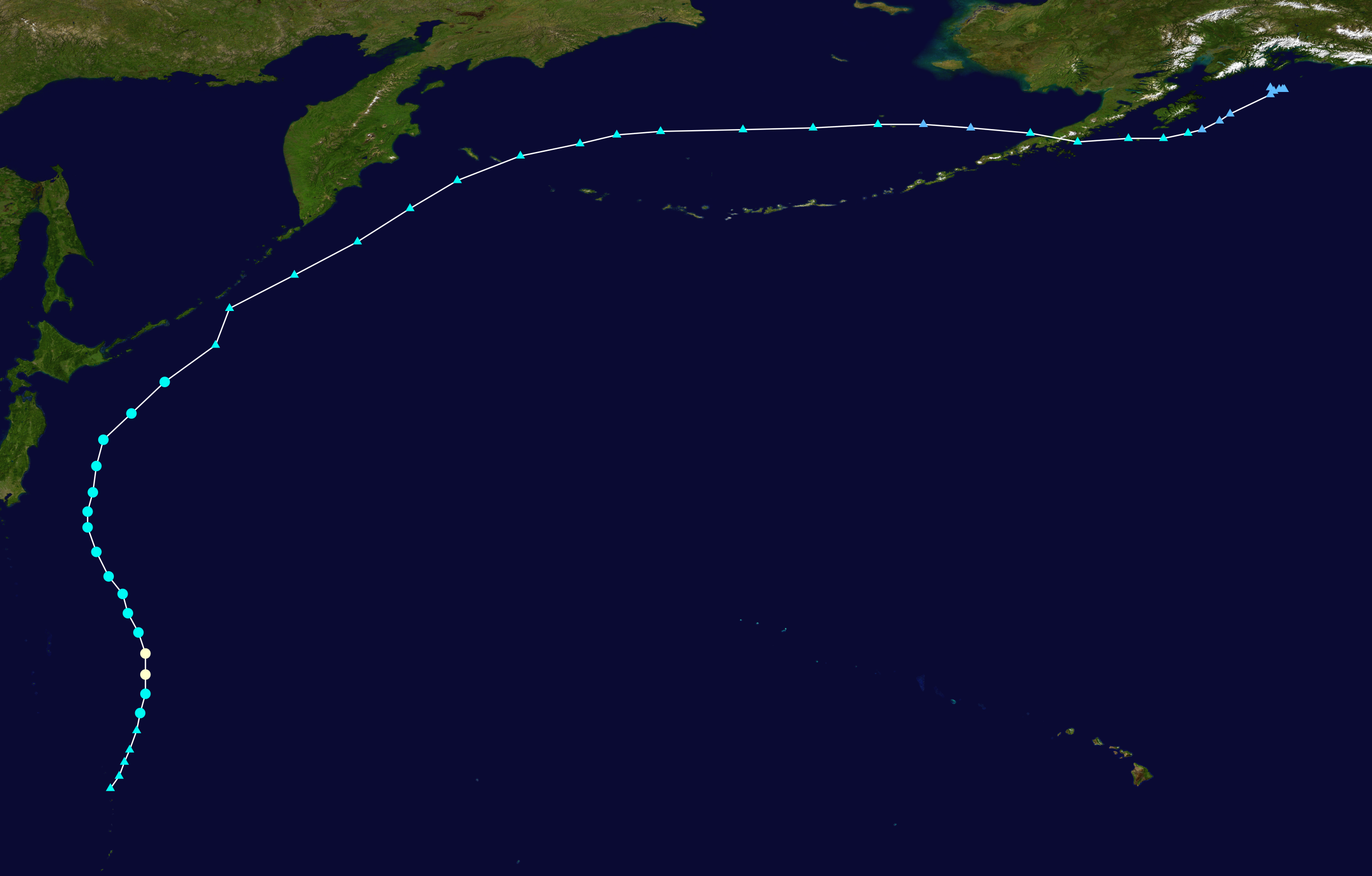
- Duration: August 2 – August 9
- Peak intensity: 110 km/h (70 mph) (10-min); 975 hPa (mbar)

During August 2, the JMA started to monitor a tropical depression that had developed within a favourable environment for further development, about 565 km (350 mi) to the northeast of Hagåtña, Guam. The system had a broad and weak low level circulation centre, which had atmospheric convection flaring around the system's outer edge. Over the next couple of days the system slowly moved north-eastwards, before it was classified as Tropical Storm 07W by the JTWC and named Omais by the JMA during August 4.

A high-pressure system kept Omais to the east of Japan producing hot and steamy conditions across Japan approximately about 1000 people were taken to hospital due to heat stroke as the heat index climbed well into the 40s.

On August 9, Omais transitioned to an extratropical cyclone as it moved over cooler waters of the northwestern Pacific Ocean, Omais fully dissipated on August 10.

=== Tropical Storm Conson ===
- Tropical storm (JMA)
- Tropical storm (SSHWS)
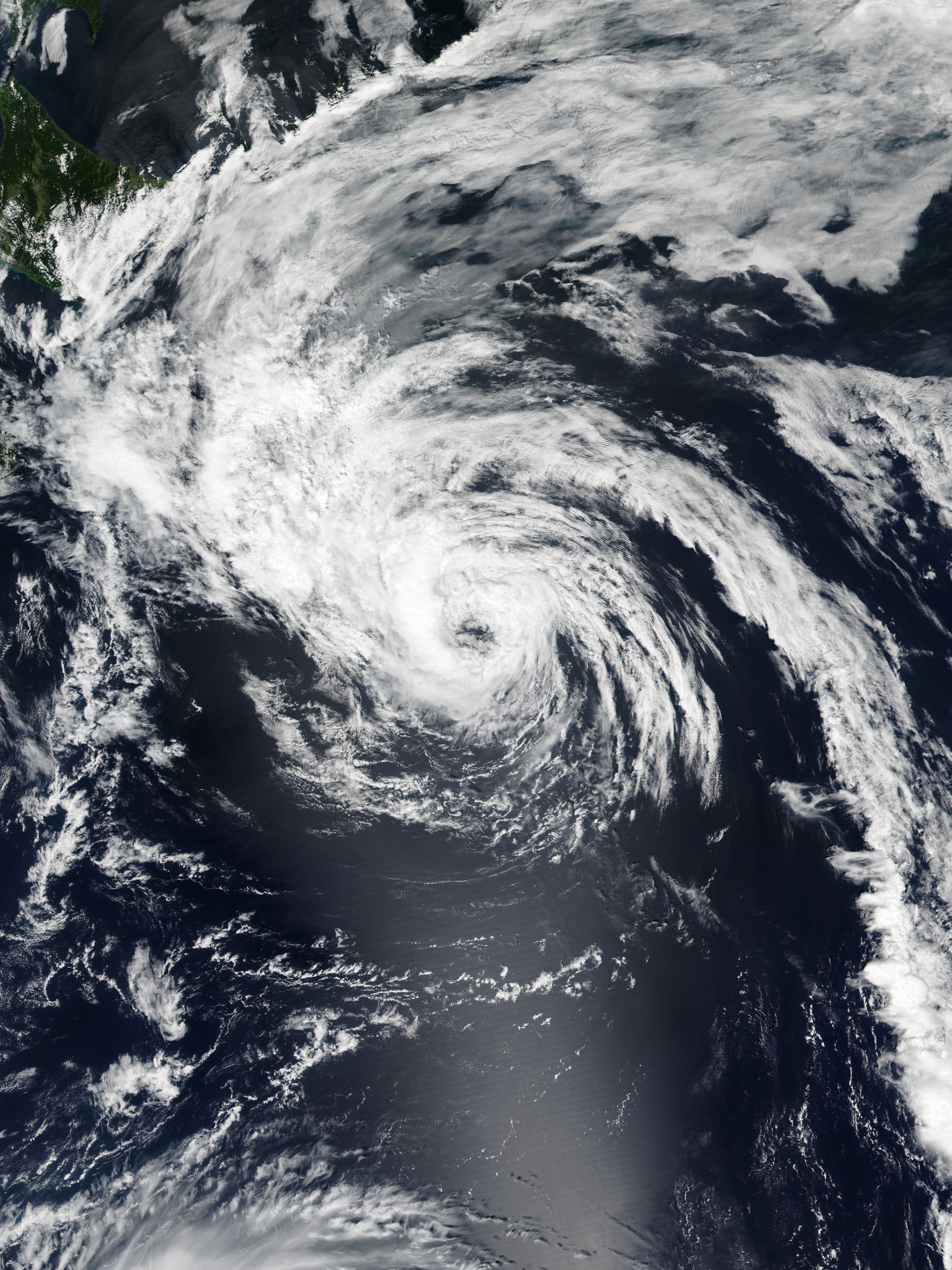
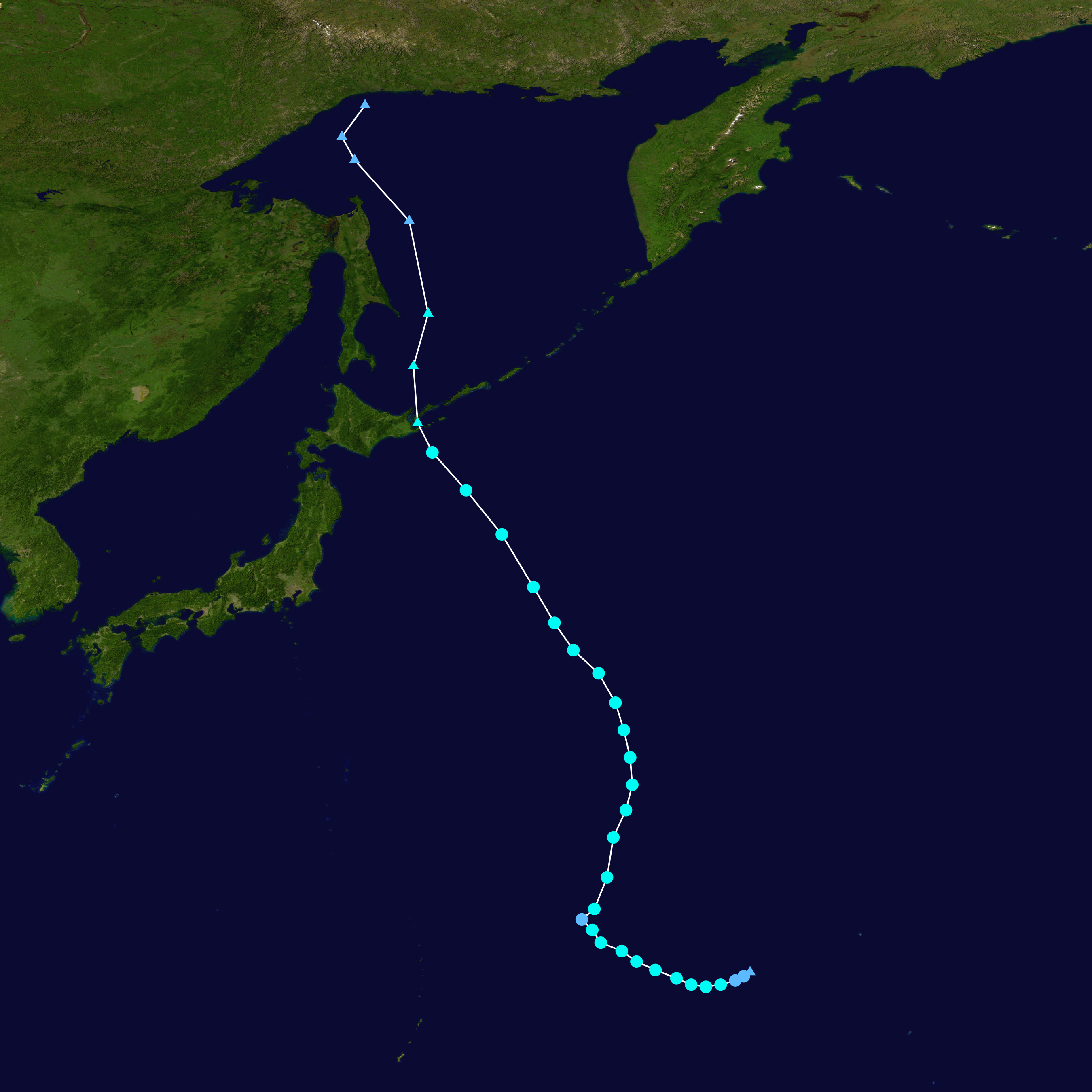
- Duration: August 7 – August 15
- Peak intensity: 85 km/h (50 mph) (10-min); 985 hPa (mbar)

On August 7, the JMA started to monitor a tropical depression that had developed about 390 km (240 mi) to the west of Wake Island. Over the next day the system gradually developed further as it moved south-westwards, before the JTWC classified it as Tropical Depression 08W during August 8. Later that day, the JMA upgraded 08W to a tropical storm, naming it Conson. Despite some moderate wind shear, Conson slowly intensified and later reached severe tropical storm strength on August 10. The JTWC later stated that deep convection was forming near the center of Conson, however shortly thereafter, convection became disorganized.

By August 11, convection once re-intensified again, however its LLCC became exposed, causing the JTWC to lower its intensity to lower-end of tropical storm strength. The JMA also downgraded Conson to a tropical storm. During the next day, satellite image showed that the convective structure of Conson was beginning to deteriorate as it started to interact with drier air, suppressing convection. The center of Conson became much broader and exposed early on August 13. While moving northwestward, Conson became better defined than before, however its convection was more shallow as it started to interact will cooler sea-surface temperatures and drier air. By August 14, the JTWC issued their final warning on Conson as it started to undergo its extratropical transition with a result of a strong wind shear and the interaction of the mid-latitude baroclinic zone. The JMA tracked Conson until it fully transitioned into an extratropical cyclone on August 15 and made landfall near Nemuro Peninsula. Its remnants were tracked until midday of August 16.

=== Severe Tropical Storm Chanthu ===
- Severe tropical storm (JMA)
- Tropical storm (SSHWS)
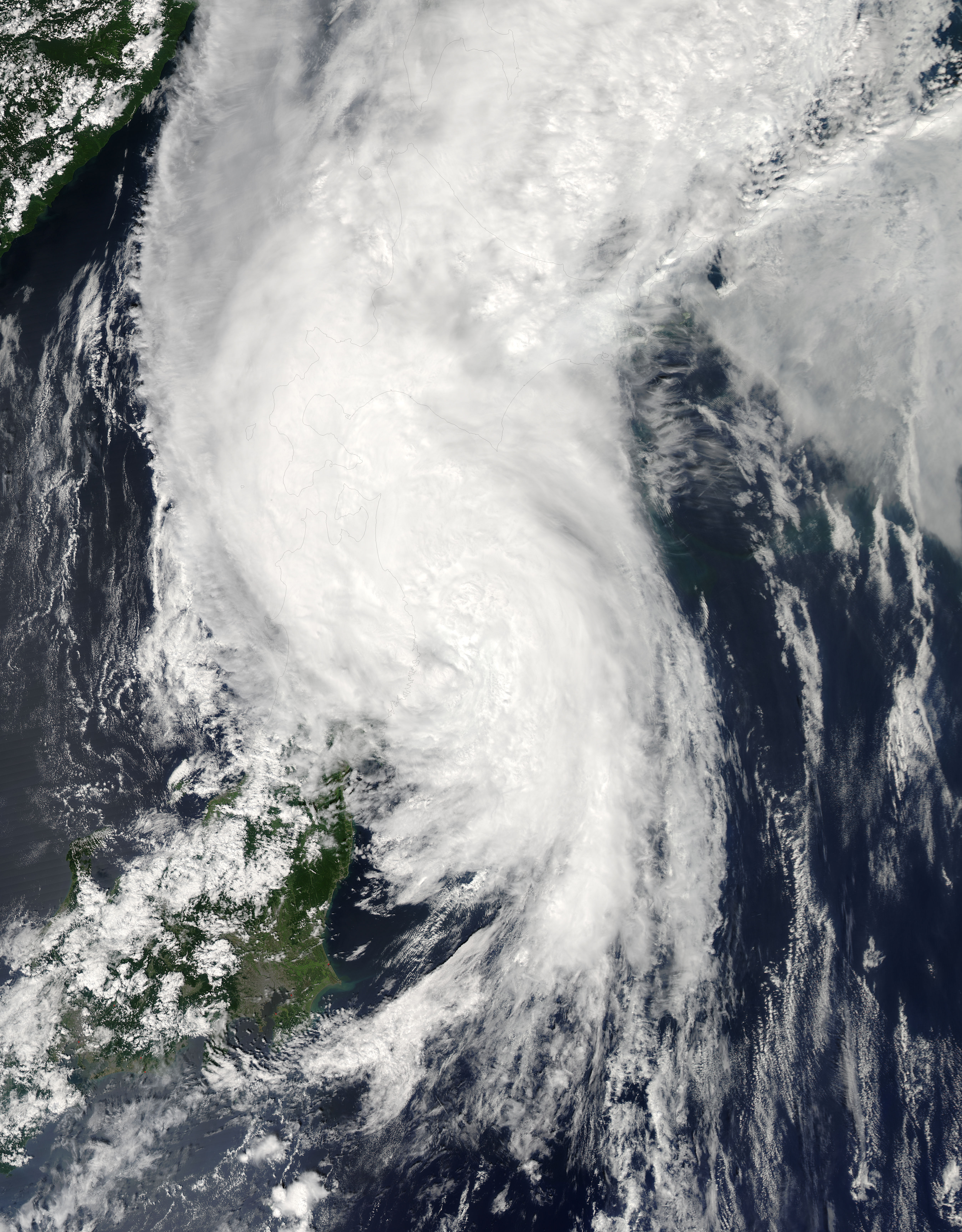
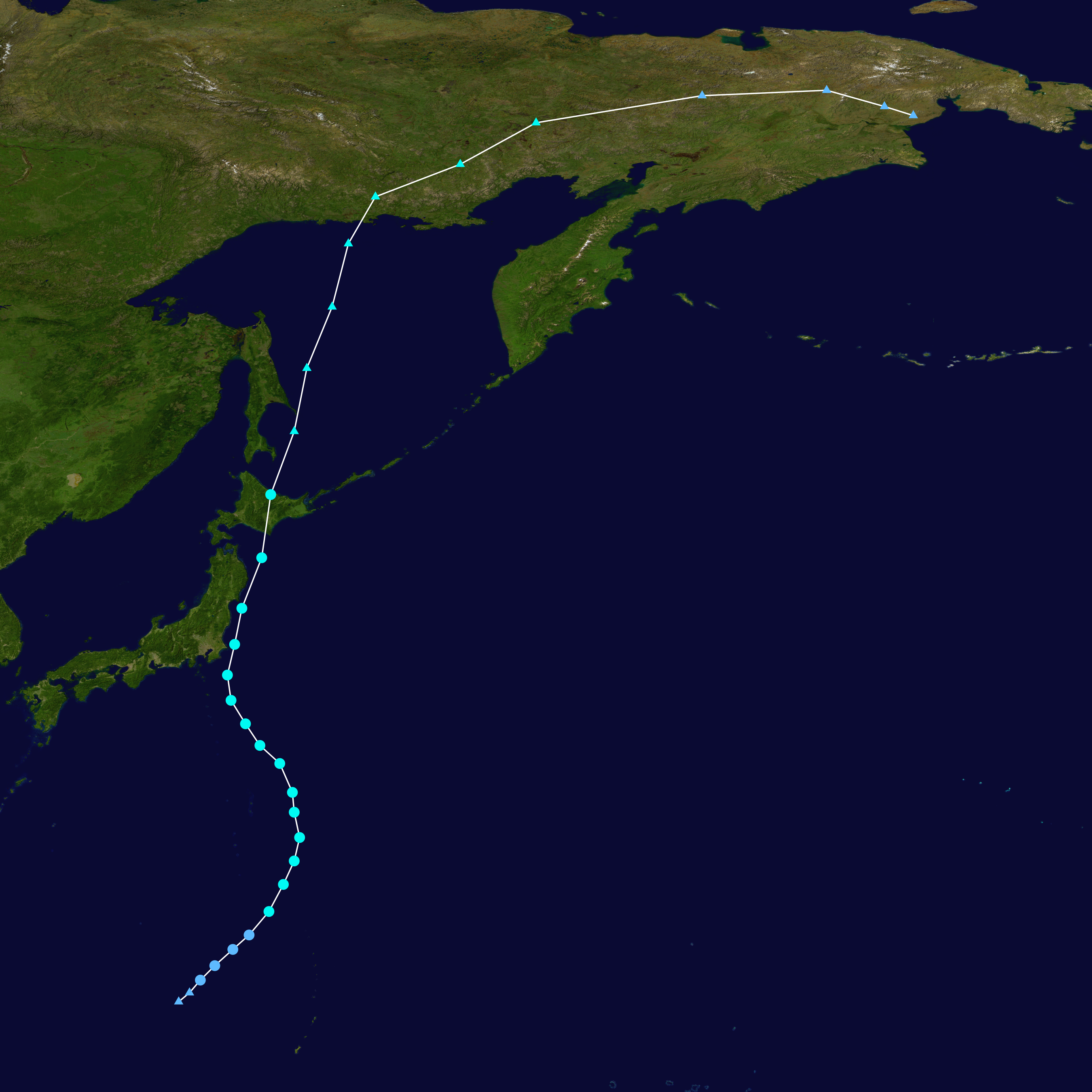
- Duration: August 12 – August 17
- Peak intensity: 100 km/h (65 mph) (10-min); 980 hPa (mbar)

During August 11, the JMA started to track a tropical depression, whereas the JTWC issued a Tropical Cyclone Formation Alert, as it was located about 695 km (432 mi) west-northwest of Guam. After meandering eastwards, the JTWC designated the system as 09W, while the JMA immediately upgraded 09W to a tropical storm and assigned it the name Chanthu on August 13. The JTWC followed suit early on August 14. With an improving LLCC, Chanthu rapidly developed into a severe tropical storm from the JMA, as it was later located over in an area of favorable environments of strengthening. Despite a high chance of strengthening and a well-defined LLCC, Chanthu stopped generating convection as the JMA downgraded it to a tropical storm.

Later that day, flaring convection was associated with its LLCC as it was beginning its extratropical transition while interacting with mid-latitude flow. Therefore, early on August 17, Chanthu once again reached severe tropical storm strength as it attained its peak intensity with a minimal pressure of 980 millibars (28.94 inHg), while east of the Japanese archipelago of Honshu. Shortly thereafter, the JTWC issued its final warning on Chanthu. The JMA issued its final warning a few hours later as it made landfall over Cape Erimo of Hokkaido, Japan, at peak intensity.

Agricultural damage in Japan were at ¥9.49 billion (US$94.7 million).

=== Tropical Storm Dianmu ===
- Tropical storm (JMA)
- Tropical storm (SSHWS)
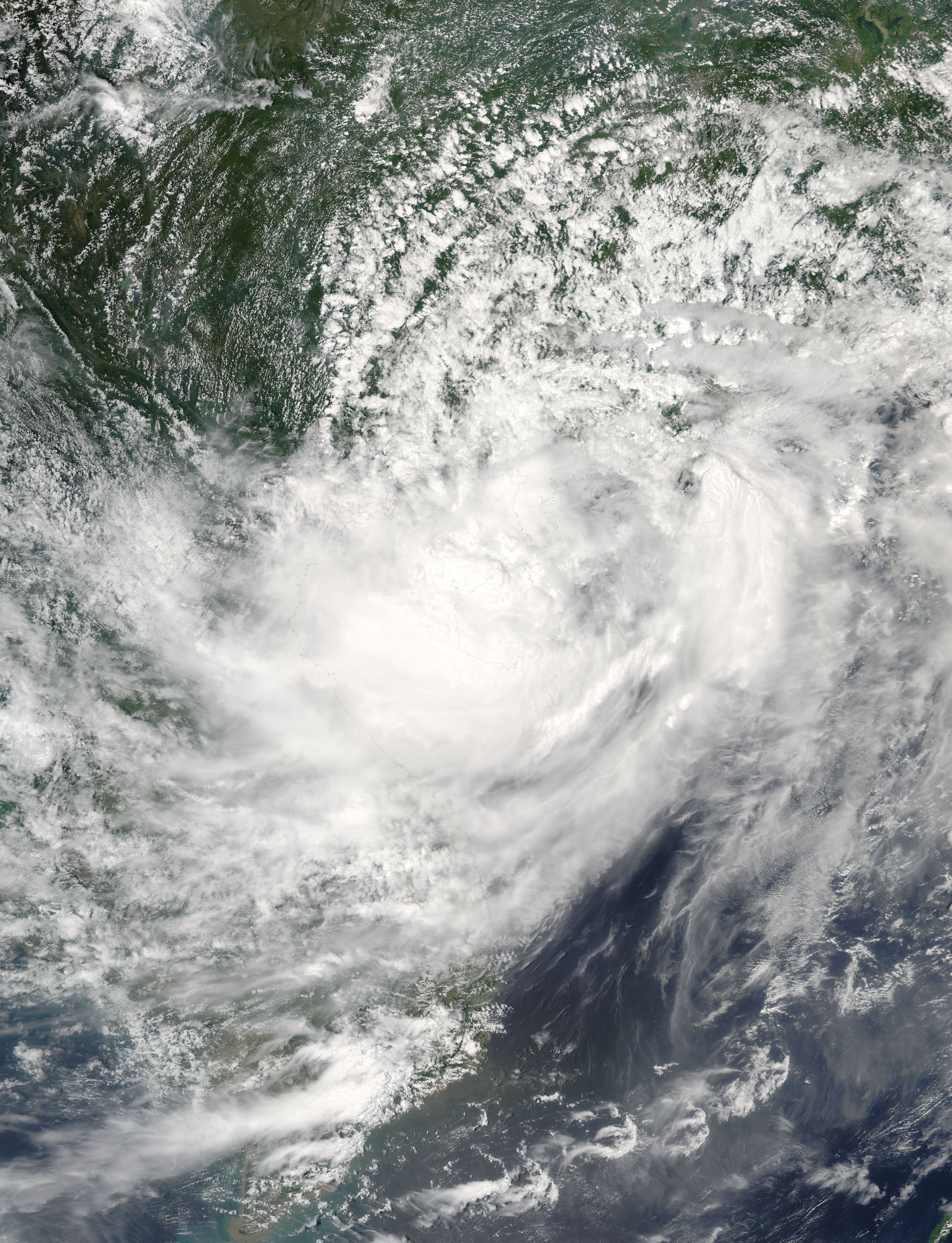
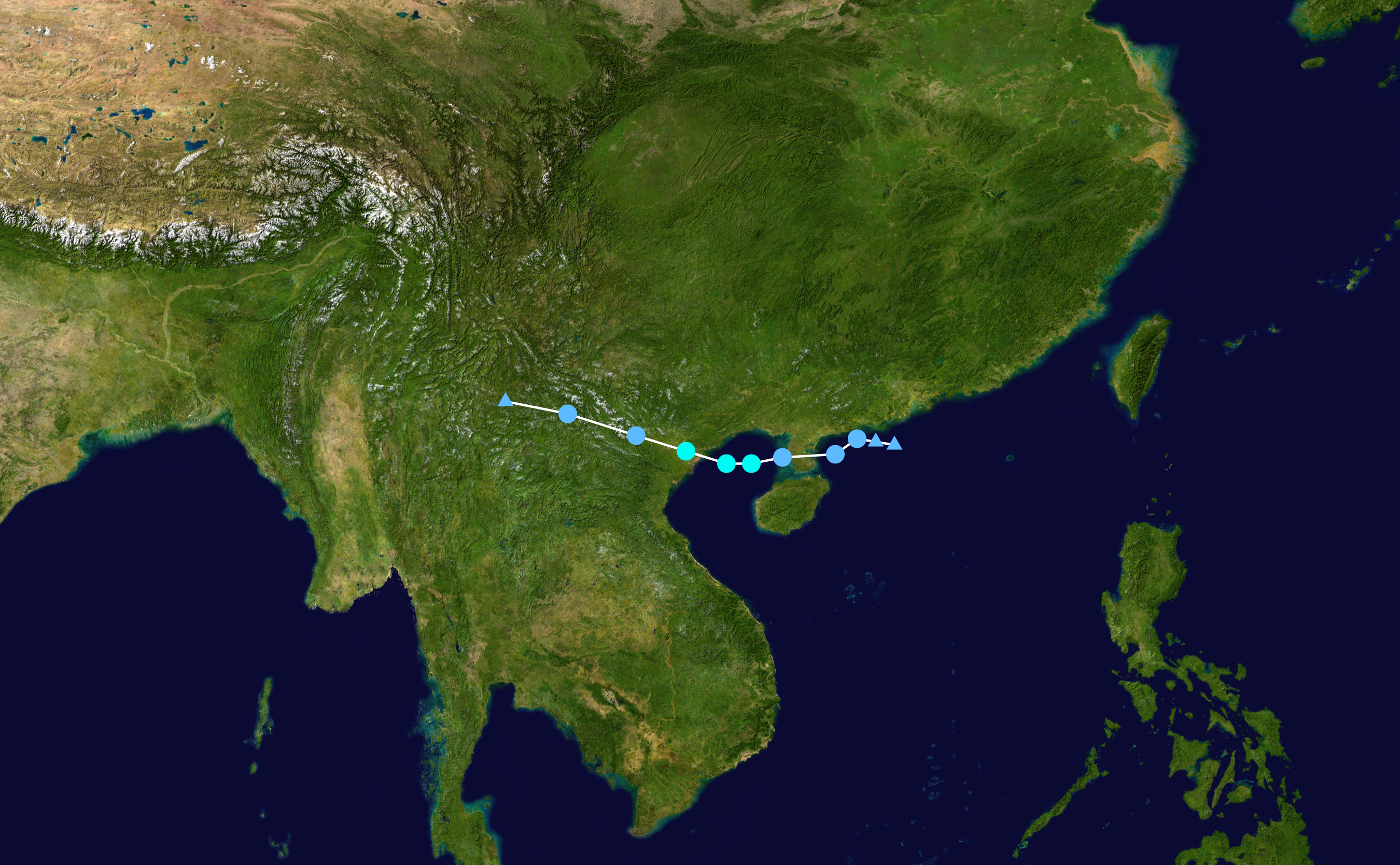
- Duration: August 15 – August 20
- Peak intensity: 75 km/h (45 mph) (10-min); 980 hPa (mbar)

On August 15, a tropical depression developed about 305 km (190 mi) to the southeast of Hong Kong. During the course of August 17, enhanced satellite imagery showed that Dianmu was rapidly organizing with deep flaring convection surrounding its LLCC. Dianmu made landfall in Haiphong and Thái Bình Province in northern Vietnam. While overland, the system gradually weakened into a tropical depression, before it degenerated into an area of low pressure during August 20 while over Myanmar.

In the province of Hainan, China, Dianmu's heavy rains brought the water level at the Longtang Dam on the Nandu River to a ten-year high of 13.35 metres. Hainan's capital, Haikou, experienced flooding in some areas. Over in Quảng Ninh, a total of 11 houses were collapsed and total damages in the city amounted to 3.5 billion VND (US$157,000).

=== Typhoon Mindulle ===
- Typhoon (JMA)
- Category 1 typhoon (SSHWS)
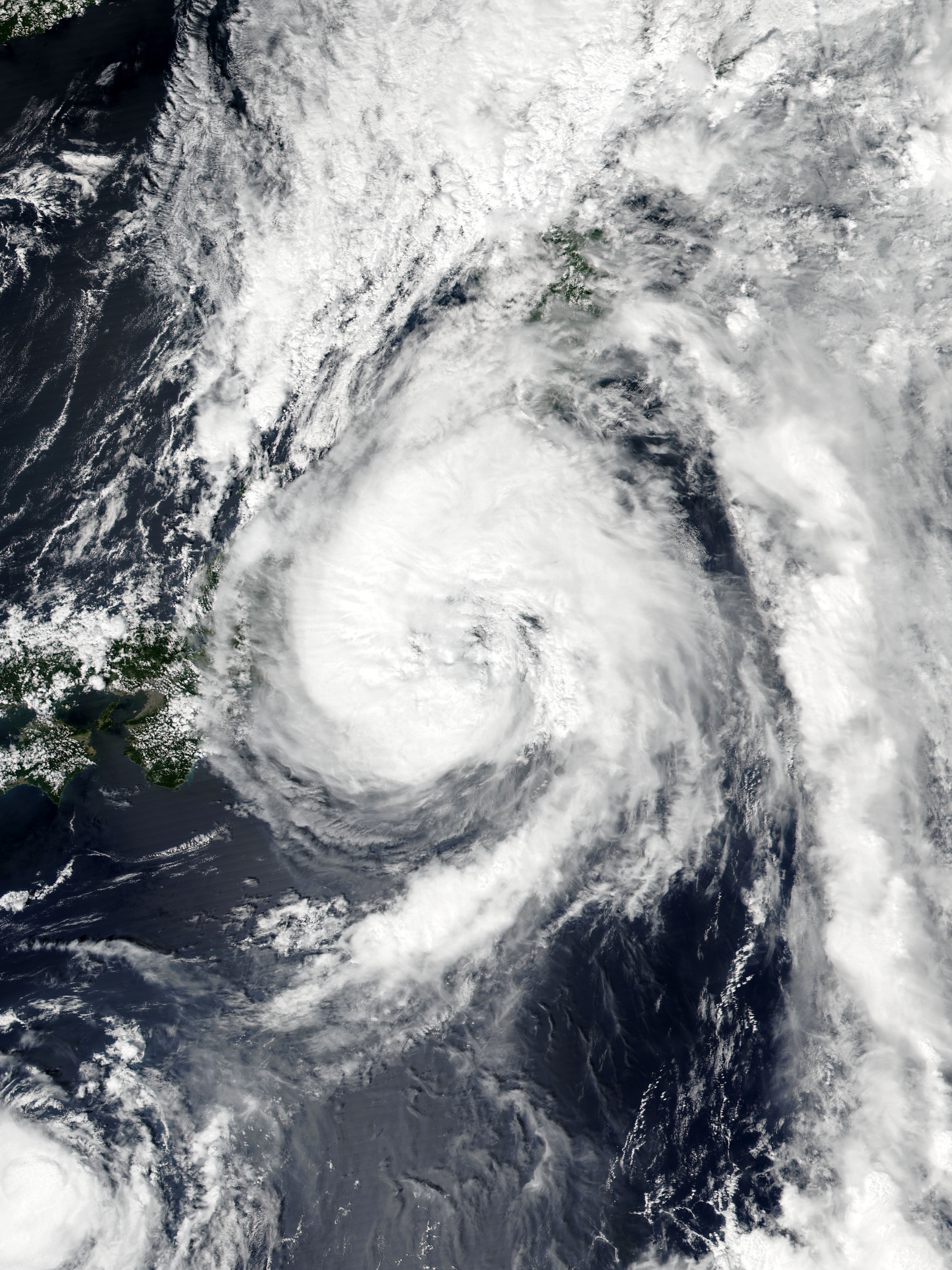
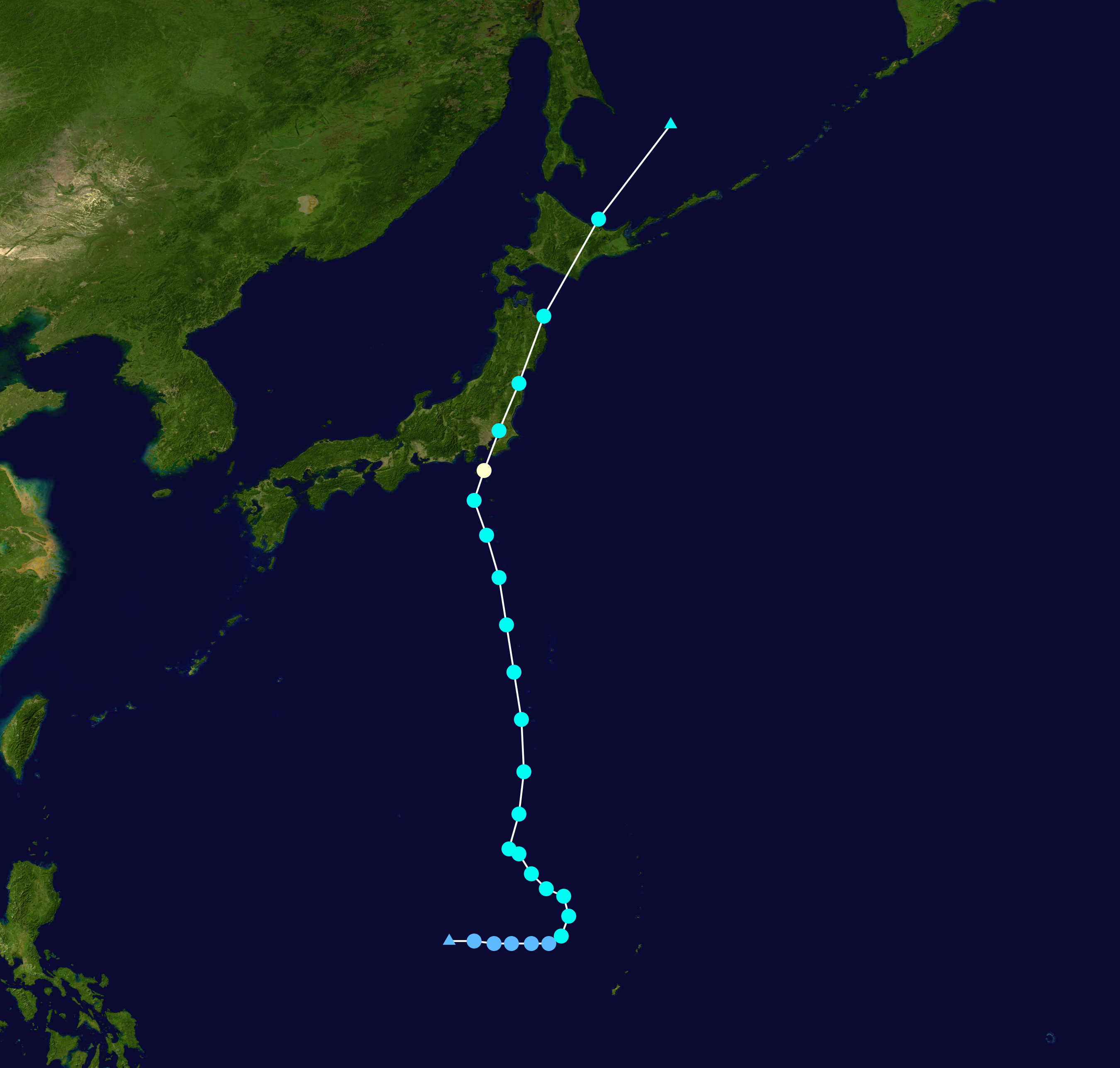
- Duration: August 17 – August 23
- Peak intensity: 120 km/h (75 mph) (10-min); 975 hPa (mbar)

A tropical depression formed northwest of Guam on August 17. On August 19, the system became a tropical storm and was named Mindulle early on August 19. However, an upper-level low to the north and the predecessor of Tropical Storm Kompasu to the northeast were stifling the development of poleward outflow.

Moving on the eastern edge of a relatively high-latitude monsoon gyre and being steered by the southern extension of the subtropical ridge anchored east of Japan, the intensification of Mindulle was limited on August 20, owing to modest dry air entrainment resulting in flaring convection near and surrounding the LLCC. Although Mindulle became a severe tropical storm when it was approximately 380 km (240 mi) northwest of Chichi-jima at around 15:00 JST (06:00 UTC) on August 21, outflow from Tropical Storm Lionrock to the west was inhibiting further development, as the distance between their centers was only about 600 km (370 mi) at that time. With warm sea surface temperatures of between 30 and 31 °C (86 and 88 °F), good equatorward and poleward outflow channels, as well as low vertical wind shear, Mindulle became a typhoon at around 03:00 JST on August 22 (18:00 UTC on August 21), when the center was located about 40 km (25 mi) east of Hachijō-jima. At around 12:30 JST (03:30 UTC), Mindulle made landfall over the area near Tateyama, Chiba.

=== Typhoon Lionrock (Dindo) ===
- Very strong typhoon (JMA)
- Category 4 typhoon (SSHWS)
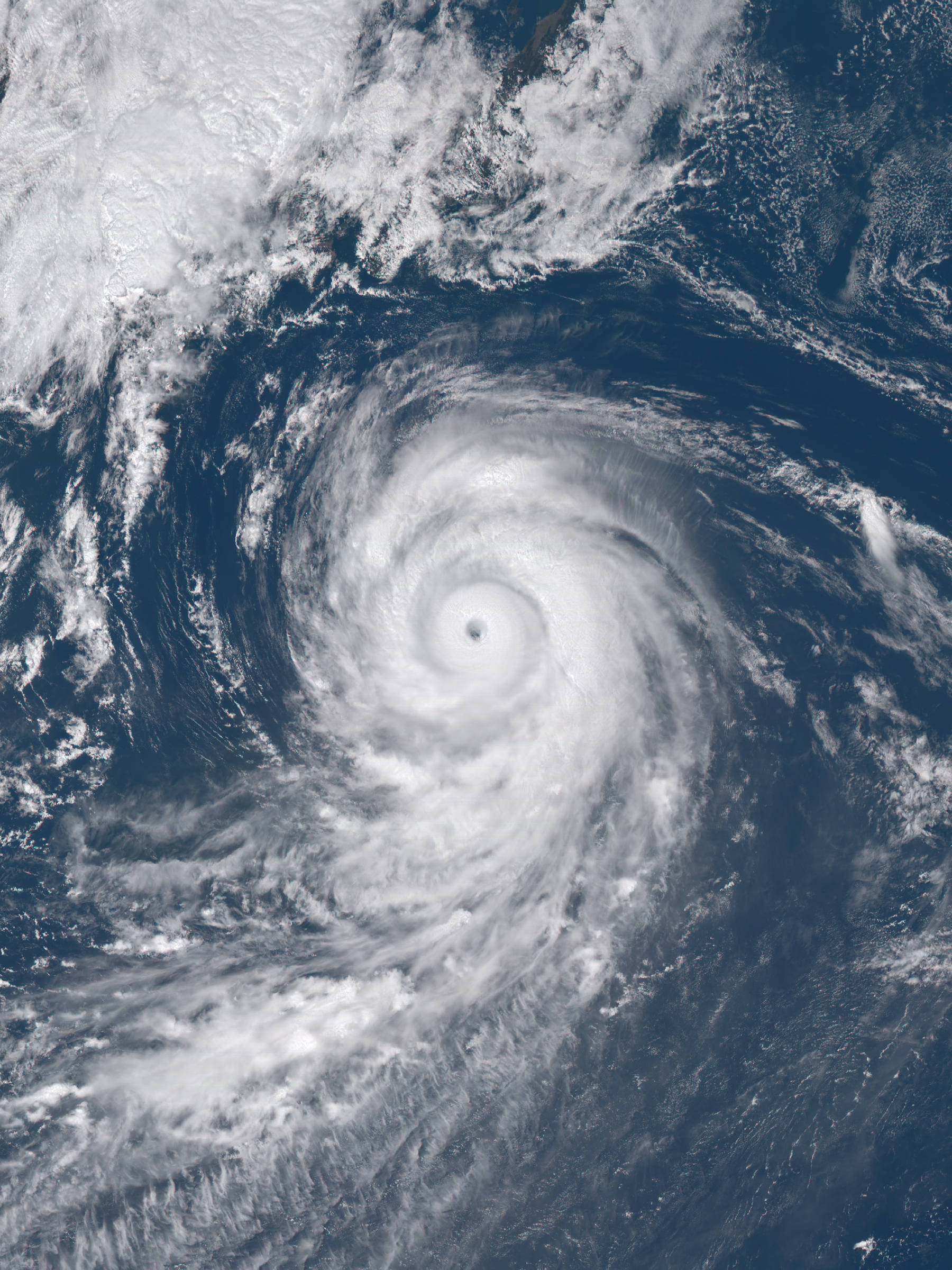
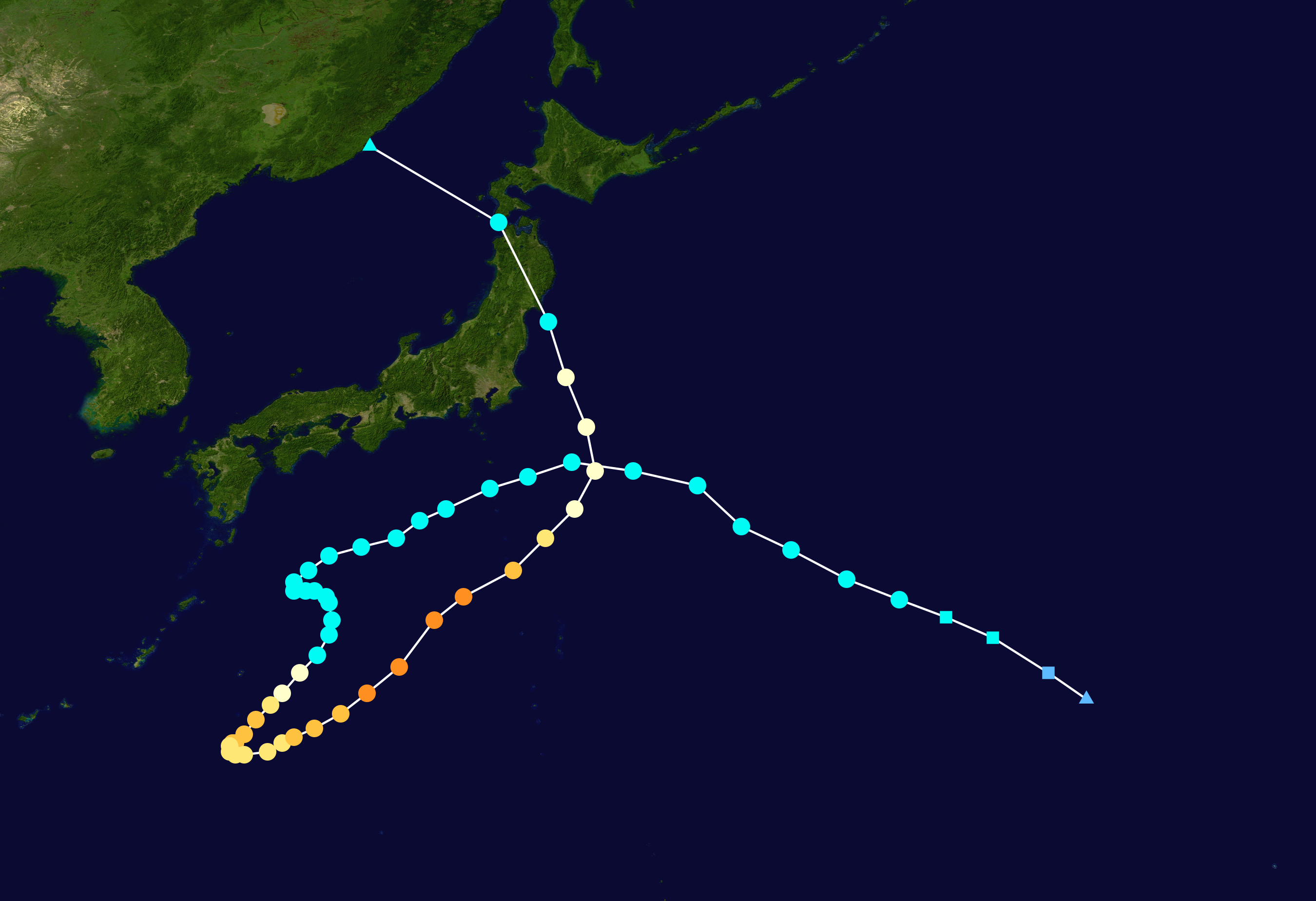
- Duration: August 17 – August 30
- Peak intensity: 165 km/h (105 mph) (10-min); 940 hPa (mbar)

The system that was to become Typhoon Lionrock was first noted as a hybrid disturbance on August 15, while it was located about 585 km (365 mi) to the west of Wake Island. It developed into a tropical depression about 690 km (430 mi) northwest of Wake Island on August 16. At this time the disturbance had a broad and poorly organized low level circulation centre, which had some shallow bands of atmospheric convection wrapping loosely around it. Over the next day, the system moved northwards, while a TUTT cell created subsidence and high vertical windshear over the system. The JTWC considered the system to be subtropical at this time, as its structure was asymmetric, with deep convection displaced to the north and east of the system's low level circulation centre. From late August 20 to early August 22, the system had at least somewhat an interaction with Mindulle, taking an erratic and slow path for a bit. Restrengthening begun again quickly, with the system already starting to develop an eye in mid-August 23. In the middle of the 24th of August the system reached an initial peak as a Category 3-equivalent storm.

Lionrock entered the Philippine Area of Responsibility on August 25, 2016, and PAGASA assigned Dindo as the local name, while Lionrock had begun an eyewall replacement cycle early that day, weakening to a Category 2-equivalent storm. After two days, early on August 26, it finally completed the eyewall replacement cycle, but slow restrengthening occurred. Another two days passed until it reached its full peak as a Category 4-equivalent storm, which rapid weakening ensued after. On August 29, Lionrock turned towards the northwest due to a high-pressure system located east of Japan, putting it on an towards the northeastern region of the country. Lionrock made landfall near Ōfunato, a city in Iwate Prefecture, Japan. This made Lionrock the first tropical cyclone to make landfall over the Pacific coast of the Tōhoku region of Japan since the Japan Meteorological Agency began record-keeping in 1951.

=== Tropical Storm Kompasu ===
- Tropical storm (JMA)
- Tropical storm (SSHWS)
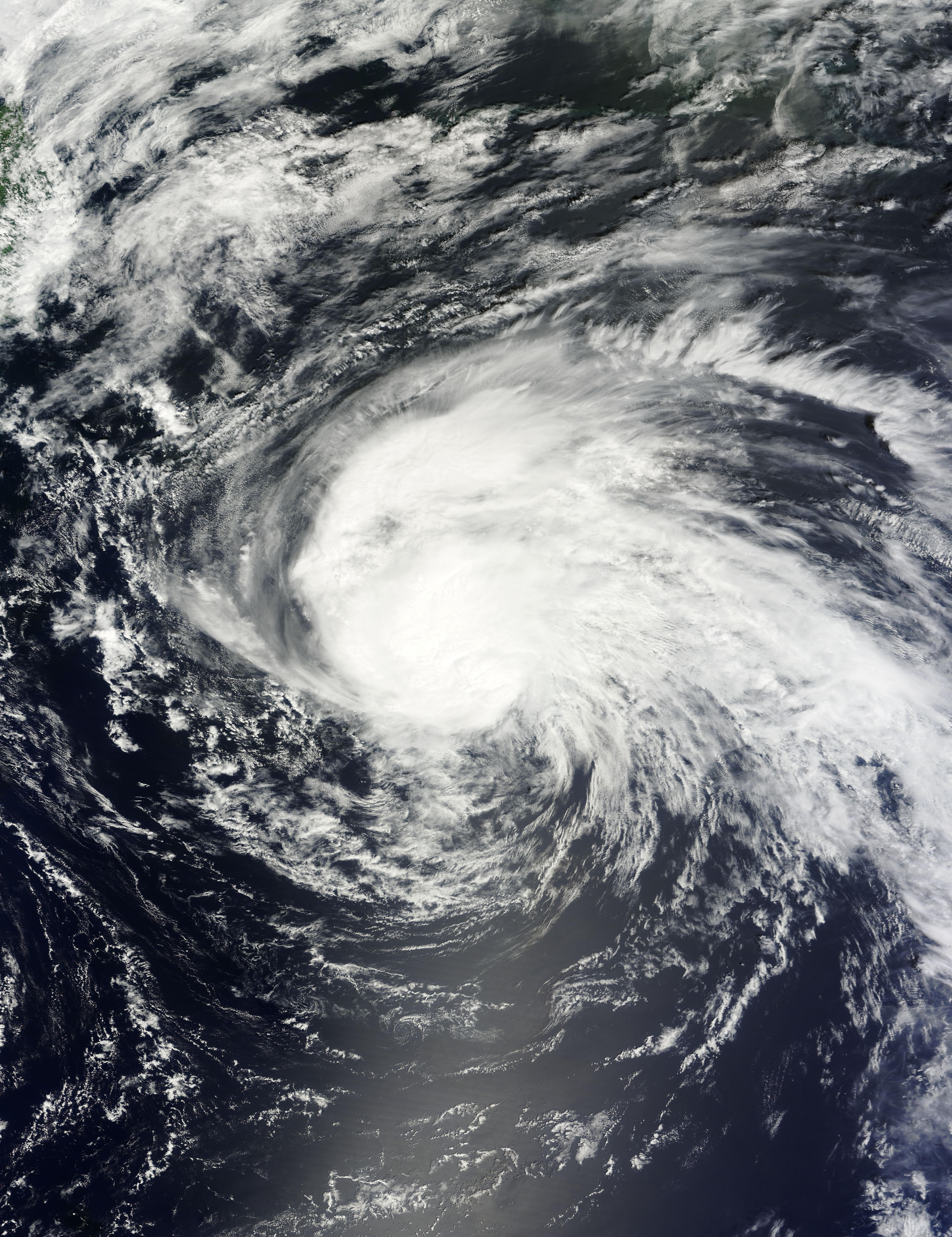
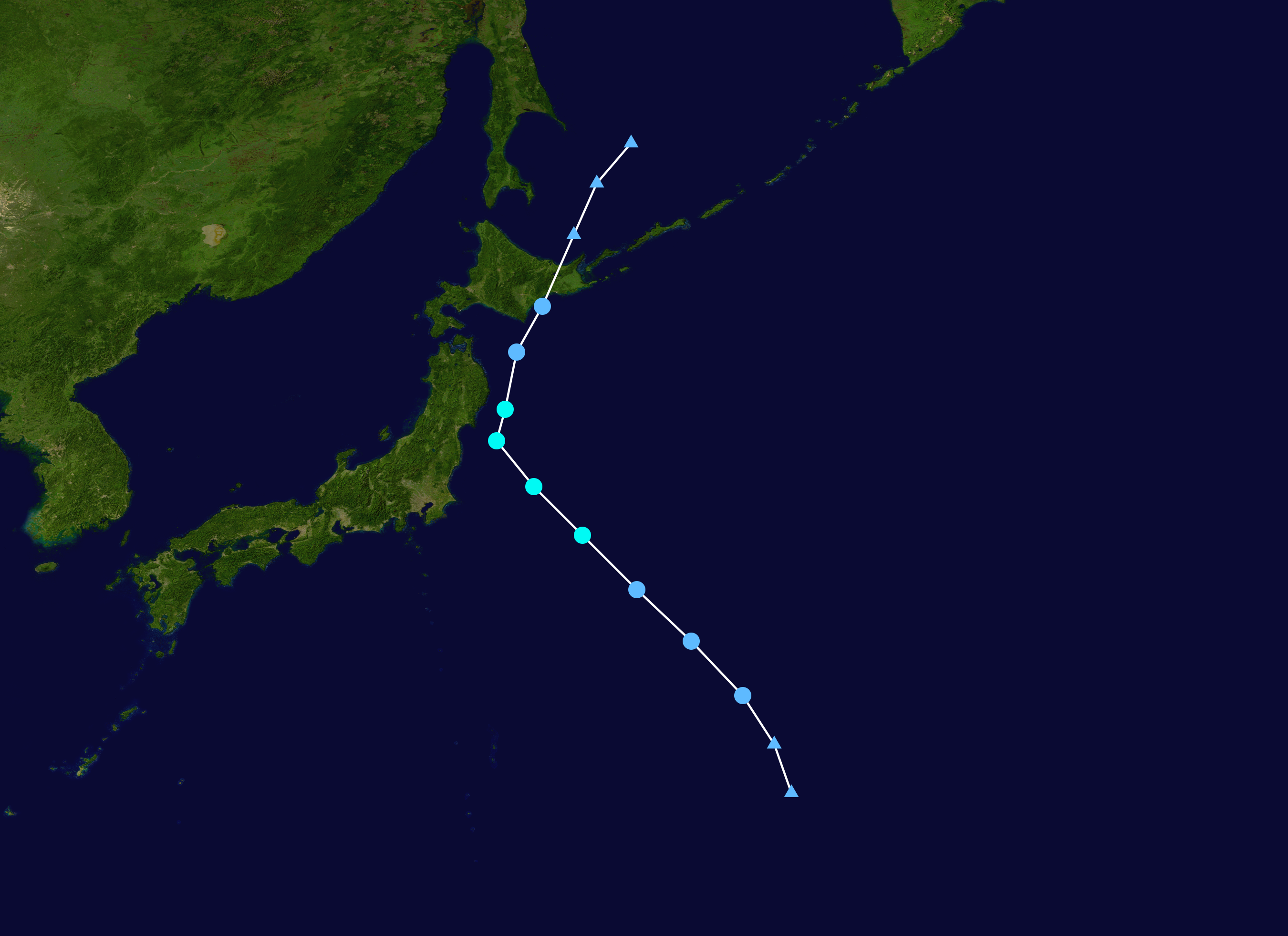
- Duration: August 18 – August 21
- Peak intensity: 65 km/h (40 mph) (10-min); 994 hPa (mbar)

On August 18, the JMA started to monitor a tropical depression that had developed, about 1,300 km (810 mi) to the northeast of Guam. The JTWC started issuing advisories by the next day as it was immediately classified as a tropical storm and the identifier of 13W. The JMA followed suit early on August 20, and was named Kompasu. Despite wind shear and an exposed LLCC, tightly curved banding was reported embedded within the northern extent of a very broad "monsoon gyre" circulation. Both agencies reported that Kompasu had reached its peak strength as a minimal tropical storm with a minimum barometric pressure of about 994 mbar. Later that day, deep convection of Kompasu had rapidly decreased as it was located in marginally favorable environments with low wind shear and sea-surface temperatures of about 26 degrees Celsius. On August 21, the JTWC downgraded Kompasu to a tropical depression and issued their final bulletin on the system. The JMA did the same and issued its final advisory on Kompasu as it transitioned into an extratropical system.

Floods in Hokkaidō killed one person when a driver was stranded in his flooded car.

=== Tropical Depression 14W ===
- Tropical depression (JMA)
- Tropical storm (SSHWS)
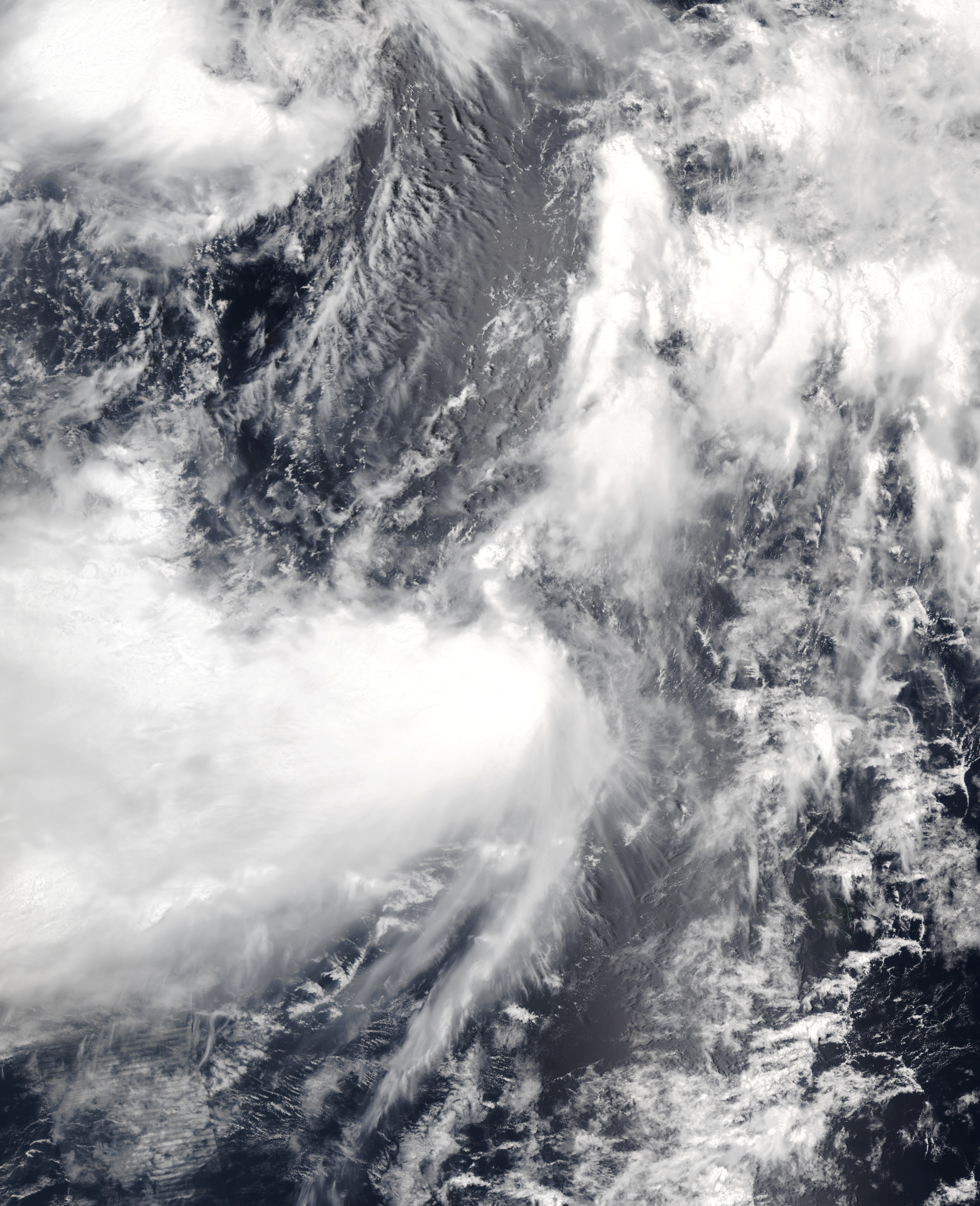
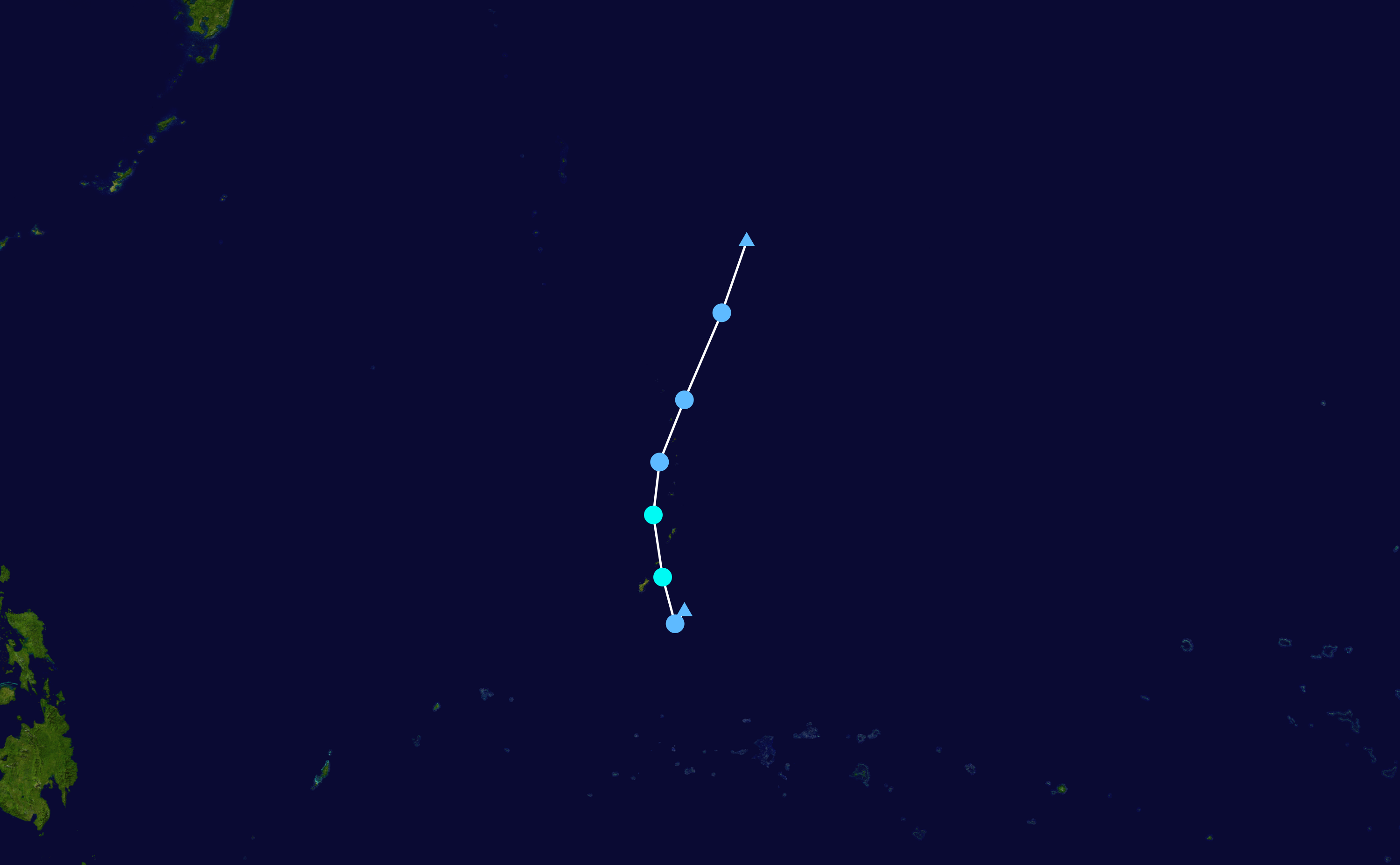
- Duration: August 23 – August 24
- Peak intensity: 55 km/h (35 mph) (10-min); 1002 hPa (mbar)

During August 23, Tropical Depression 14W developed about 75 km (45 mi) to the east of Andersen Air Force Base, Guam. Moving northward on the next day, the LLCC of 14W became exposed with a deteriorating convective signature. Flaring deep convection became disorganized into a weakly defined center due to strong northerly wind shear; the JTWC assessed 14W's winds only at 25 knots. Due to a rapidly decaying LLCC with minor bursts of convection, both the JMA and the JTWC issued its final warning on 14W later that same day.

=== Typhoon Namtheun (Enteng) ===
- Typhoon (JMA)
- Category 3 typhoon (SSHWS)
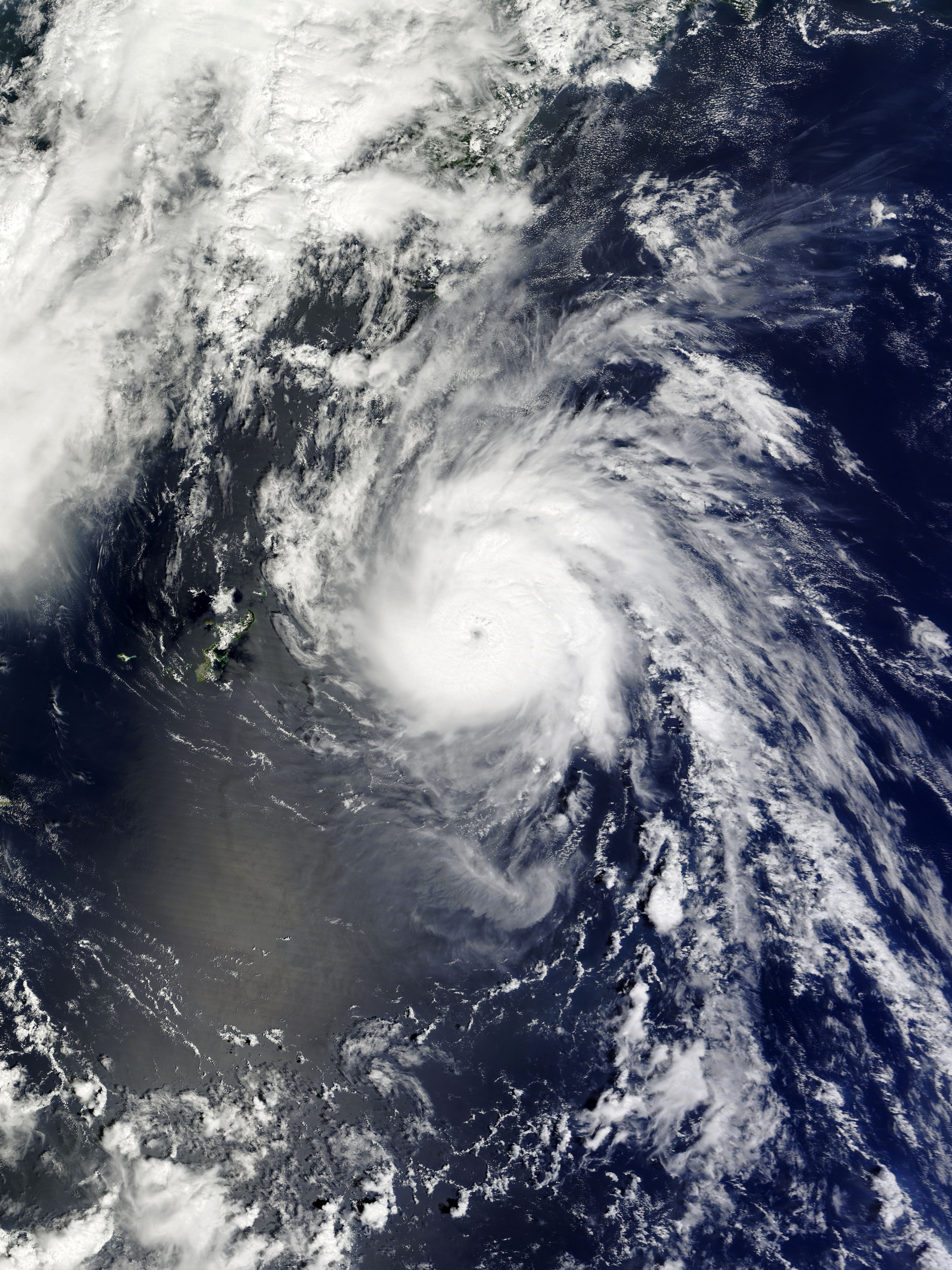
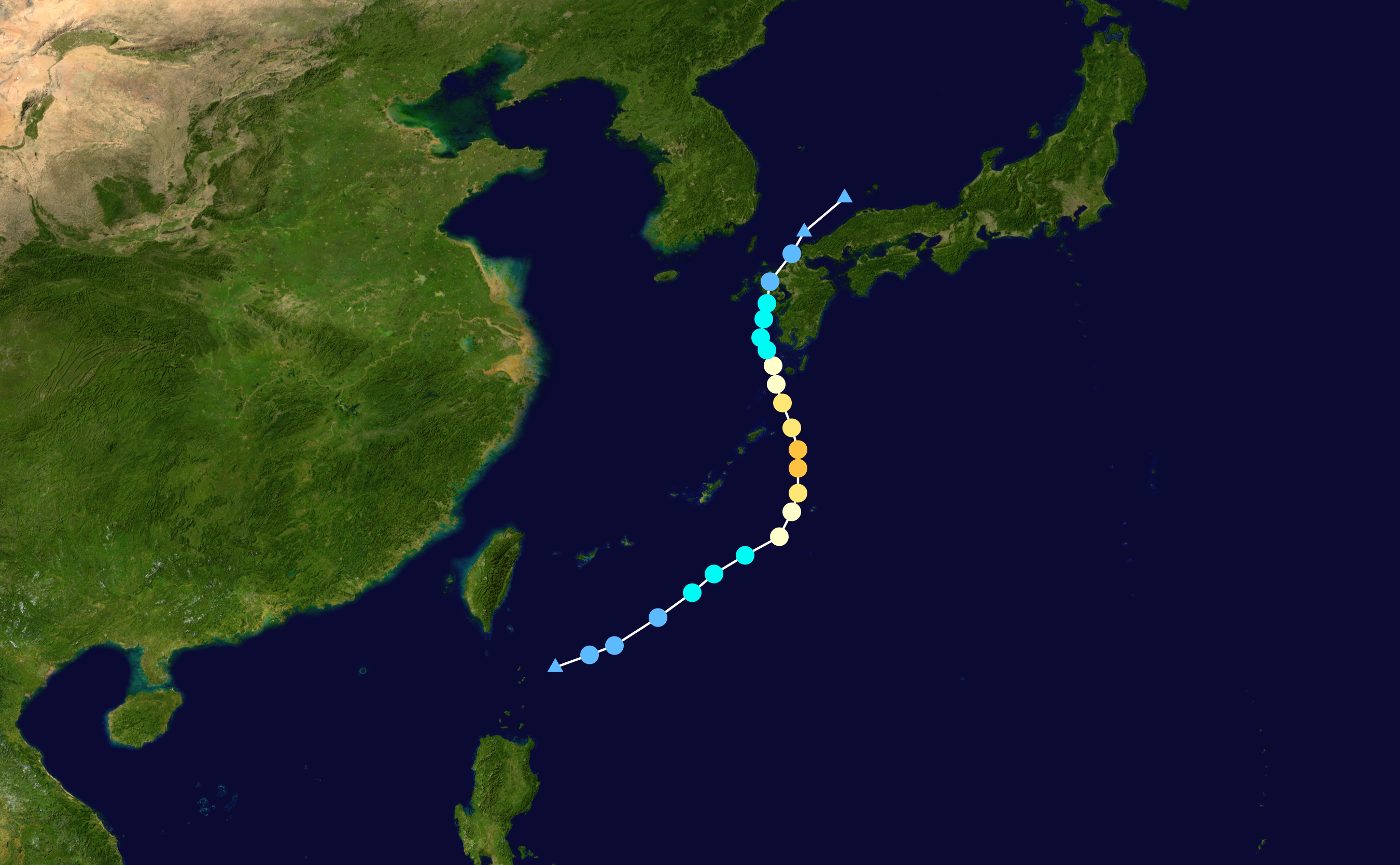
- Duration: August 31 – September 5
- Peak intensity: 130 km/h (80 mph) (10-min); 955 hPa (mbar)

A low-pressure area developed into a tropical depression southeast of Taiwan early on August 31. Later that day, the JTWC began issuing advisories on the system, assigning the designation of 15W. Early the next day, 15W had intensified into a tropical storm by both agencies, with the JMA prompting the name Namtheun. The PAGASA however started issuing advisories on Namtheun and considered it as a tropical depression and gave the local name Enteng. Despite the overall structure of the storm being described to be "midget" with a very small but compact LLCC, Namtheun had begun a phase of rapid intensification and a pinhole eye developed; therefore, the JTWC upgraded Namtheun to a Category 1 typhoon. The JMA, though, upgraded Namtheun only to a severe tropical storm at that time. Later that day, PAGASA had declared that the storm had exited its area of responsibility as a severe tropical storm.

By September 2, rapid intensification ensued as it was reported that Namtheun was located over a region of warm sea surface temperatures of 30 degrees Celsius with high ocean heat content, therefore prompting the JMA to classify it to a typhoon. Namtheun developed a pinhole eye 8 nmi (15 km; 9.2 mi) across and reached its peak strength as a Category 3 typhoon with 1-minute sustained winds of 185 km/h (115 mph); the JMA though declared its 10-minute peak strength early on September 3 with a minimum barometric pressure of 955 millibars. By that time, Namtheun was depicted with significantly weakened structure and a dissipation of its eye, therefore the JTWC downgraded Namtheun rapidly to a strong Category 1. On September 4, Namtheun had weakened to a tropical storm due to diminishing convection, caused by high southwesterly wind shear. After making landfall over in Nagasaki, Kyushu, both the JMA and JTWC issued its final advisory as a tropical depression early on September 5.

=== Tropical Storm Malou ===
- Tropical storm (JMA)
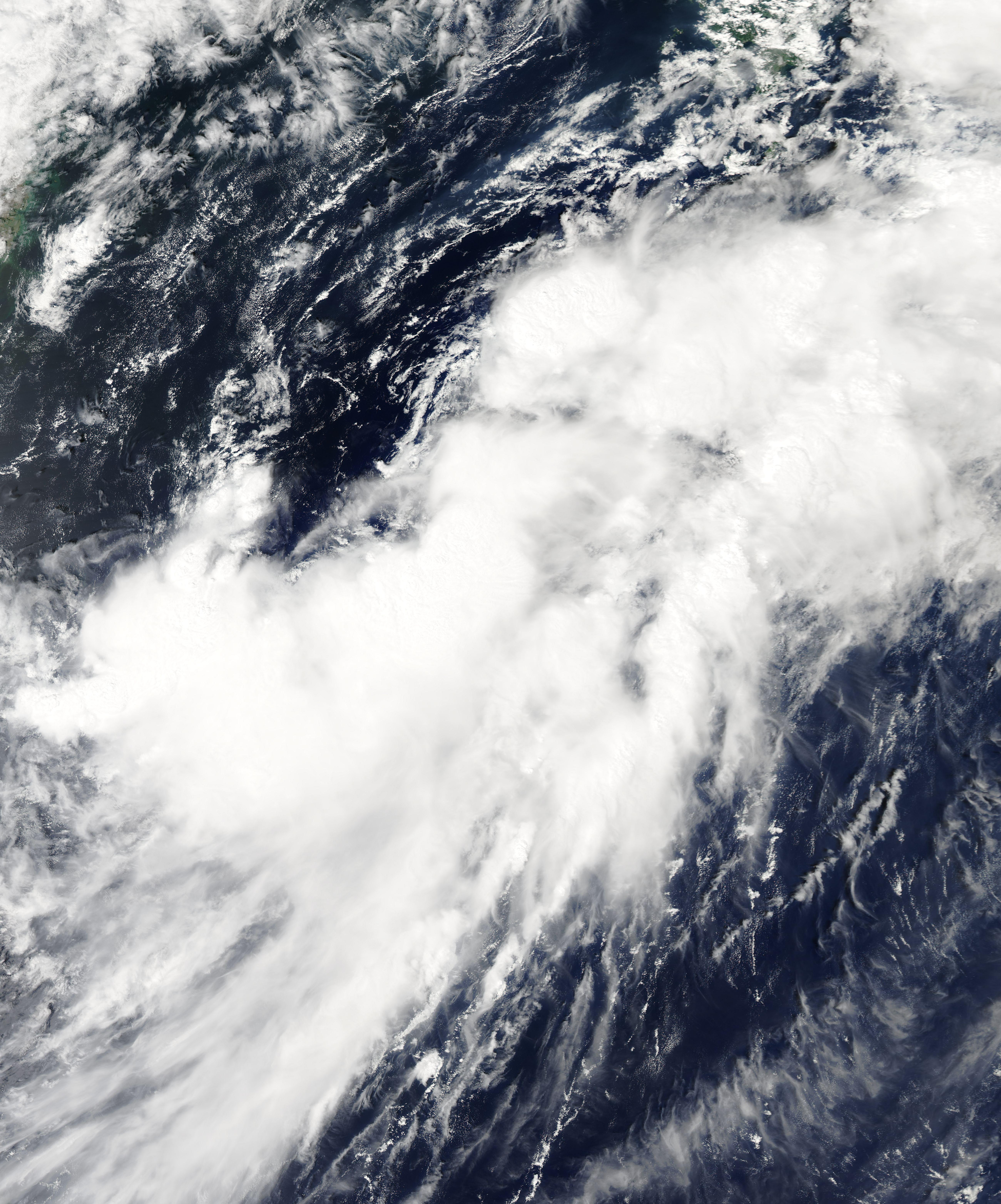
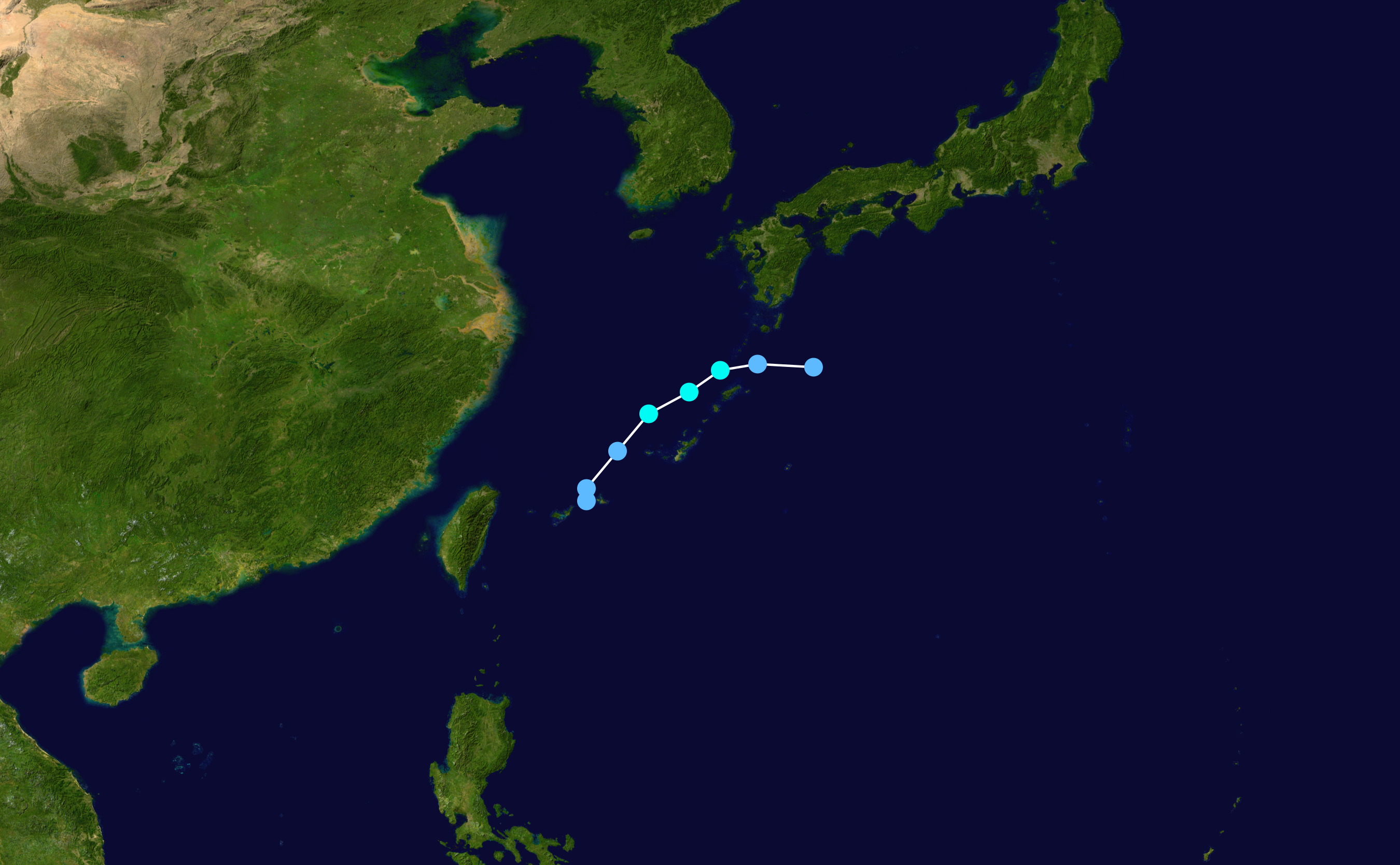
- Duration: September 5 – September 7
- Peak intensity: 75 km/h (45 mph) (10-min); 1000 hPa (mbar)

On September 5, the JMA started to monitor a tropical depression, that had developed over the Japanese prefecture of Okinawa. The depression was located within a favourable environment for further development, with very warm sea surface temperatures and low vertical wind shear. Over the next day the system moved north-eastwards towards the Japanese Mainland, before it was classified as a tropical storm and named Malou by the JMA during September 6. However, the JTWC classified Malou as a hybrid system, with both subtropical and tropical characteristics. They also noted that the convective development around the system's low level circulation centre was being hindered, as the subtropical westerlies were located over the system. During September 7, the system started to accelerate northwards, before the JMA issued their final advisory on the system as Malou became an extratropical cyclone.

=== Typhoon Meranti (Ferdie) ===
- Violent typhoon (JMA)
- Category 5 super typhoon (SSHWS)
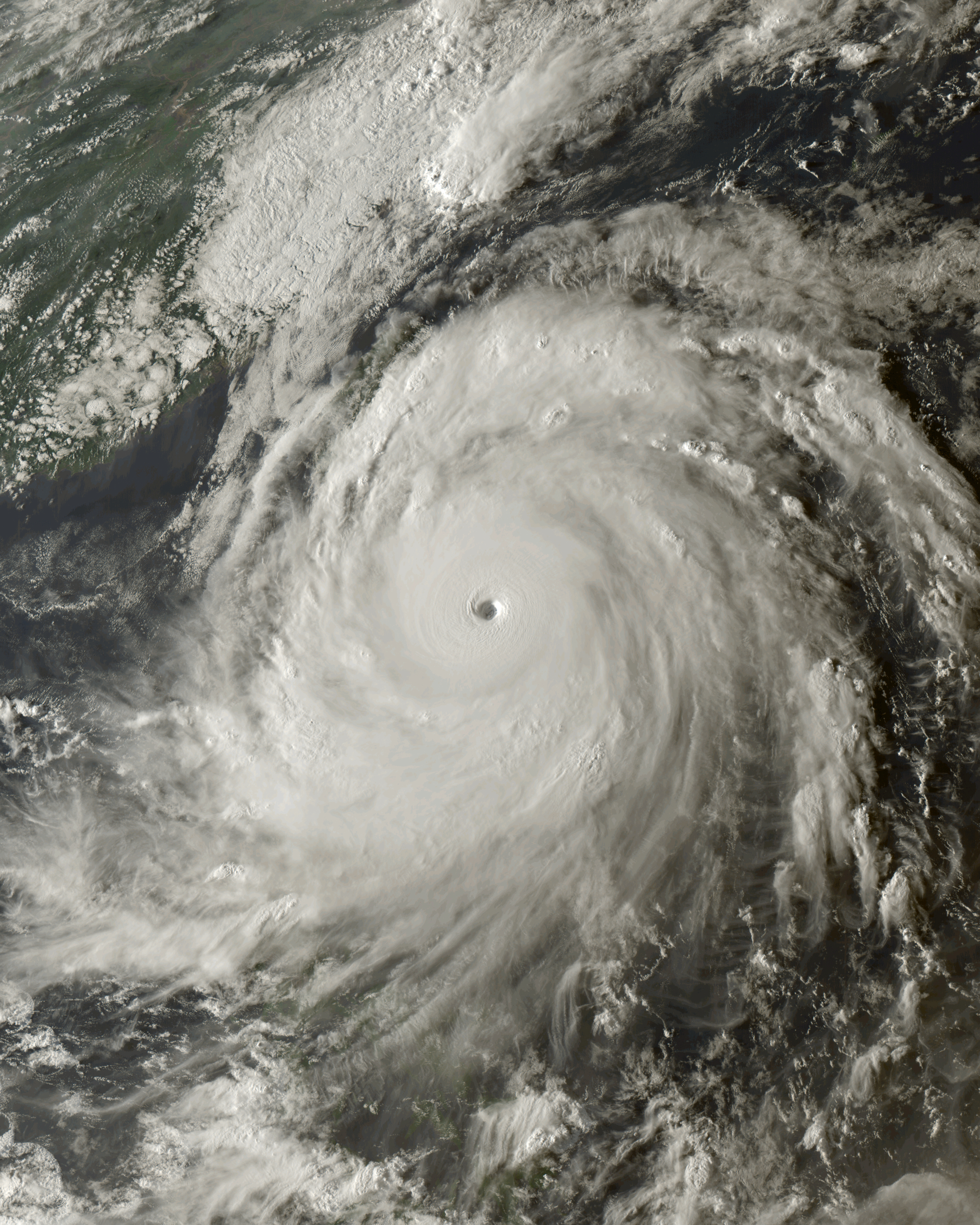
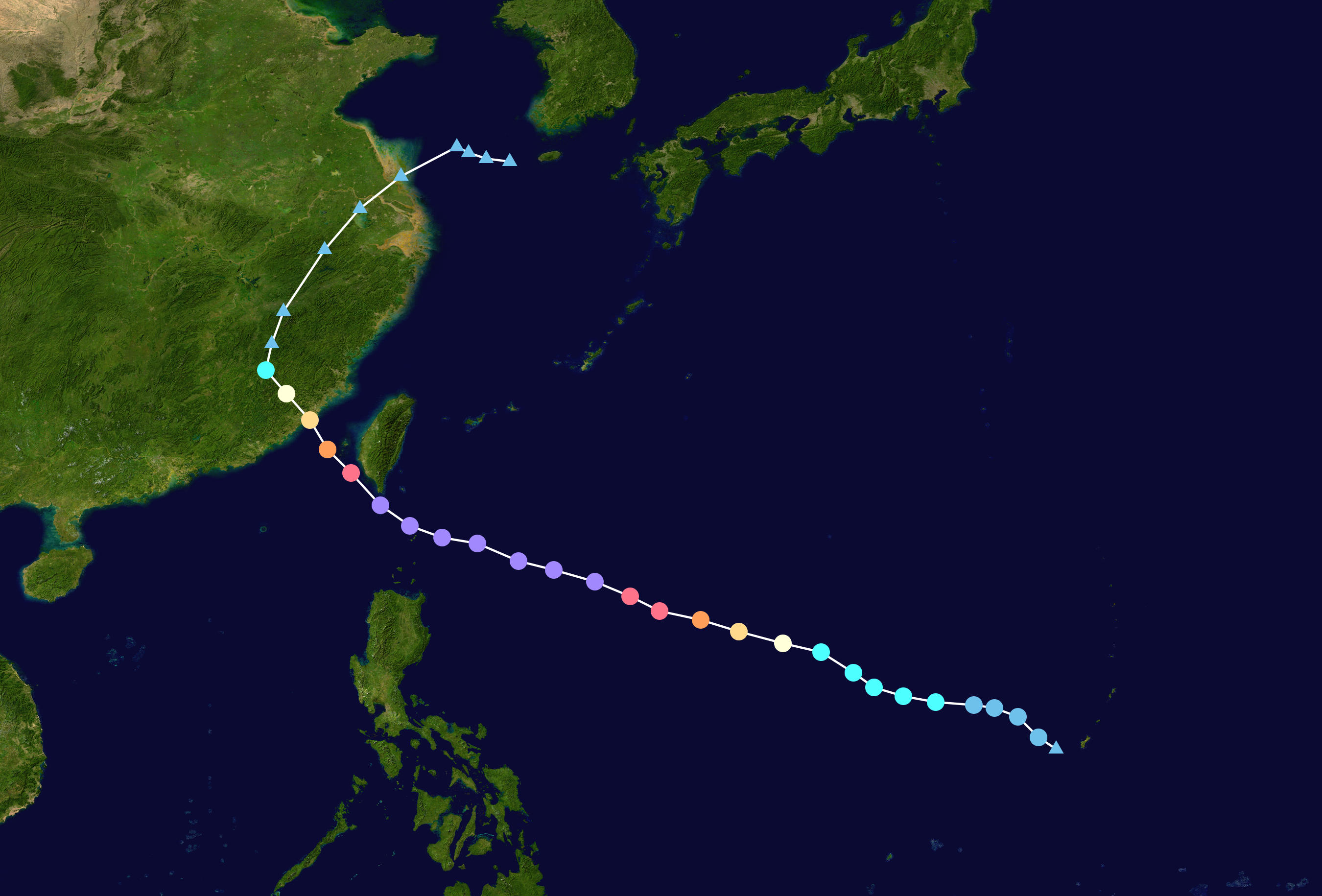
- Duration: September 8 – September 16
- Peak intensity: 220 km/h (140 mph) (10-min); 890 hPa (mbar)

On September 8, a tropical depression formed in a region of low wind shear, steered by ridges to the north and southwest, with warm water temperatures and outflow from the south. The system reached tropical storm strength by 06:00 UTC on September 10, receiving the name Meranti.

Rainbands and a central dense overcast continued to evolve as the wind shear decreased. By early on September 12, Meranti reached typhoon status. A small eye 9 km (5.6 mi) across developed within the spiraling thunderstorms, and Meranti started rapidly intensifying. Meranti quickly attained estimated 1-minute sustained winds of 285 km/h (180 mph), equivalent to Category 5 on the Saffir–Simpson scale. Meranti gradually reached its peak intensity on September 13 while passing through the Luzon Strait. The JMA estimated peak 10-minute sustained winds of 220 km/h (140 mph) and a minimum barometric pressure of 890 hPa (mbar; 26.28 inHg), while the JTWC estimated peak 1-minute sustained winds of 315 km/h (195 mph). Based on the JMA pressure estimate, Meranti was among the most intense tropical cyclones. The JTWC wind estimate made Meranti the strongest tropical cyclone worldwide in 2016, surpassing Cyclone Winston, which had winds of 285 km/h (180 mph) when it struck Fiji in February.

Late on September 13, the storm made landfall on the 83 km^{2} (32 sq mi) island of Itbayat in the Philippine province of Batanes while near its peak intensity. At around 03:05 CST on September 15 (19:05 UTC on September 14), Meranti made landfall over Xiang'an District, Xiamen in Fujian, China with measured 2-minute sustained winds of 173 km/h (107 mph), making it the strongest typhoon to ever make landfall in China's Fujian Province.

=== Tropical Depression 17W ===
- Tropical depression (JMA)
- Tropical storm (SSHWS)
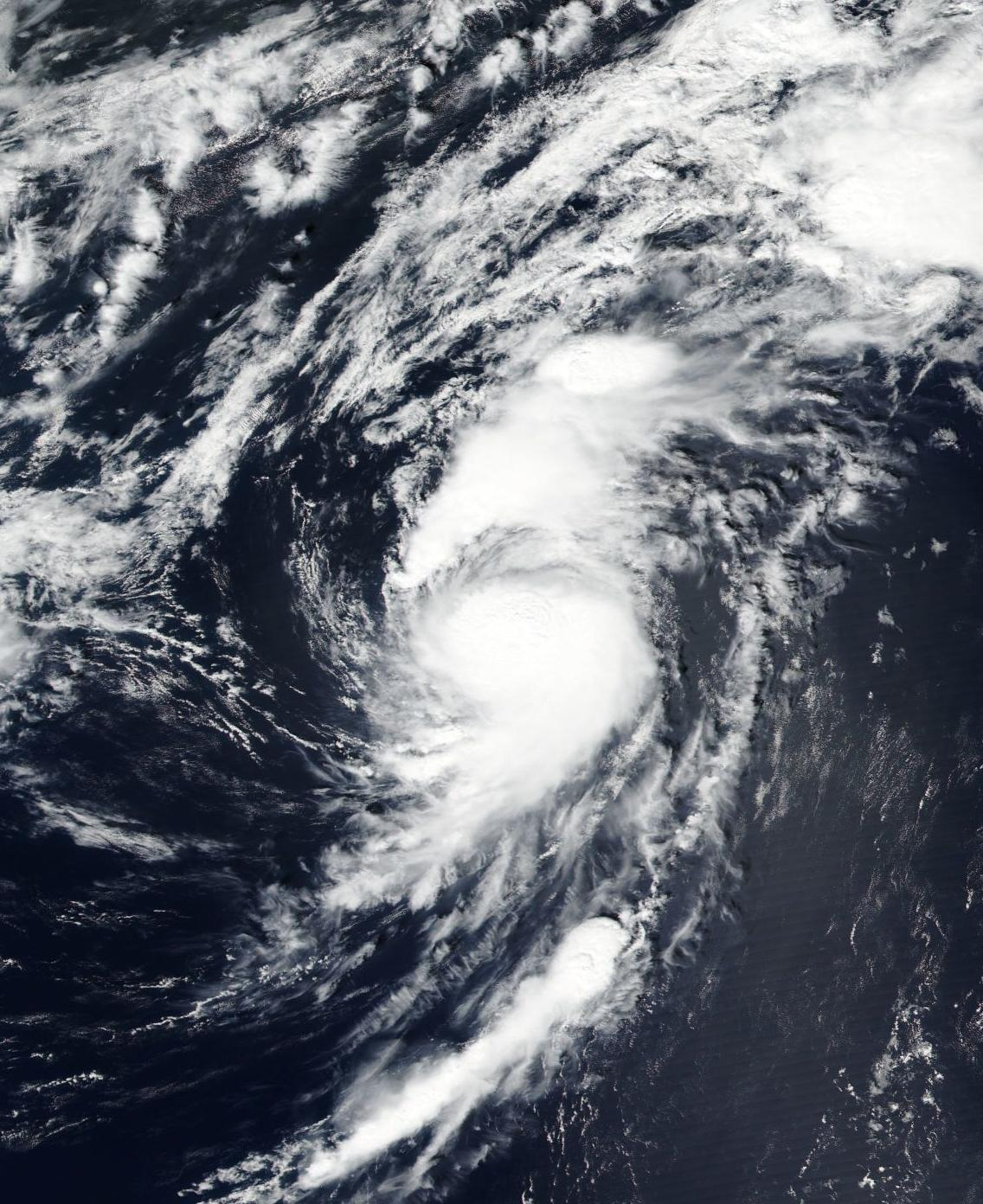
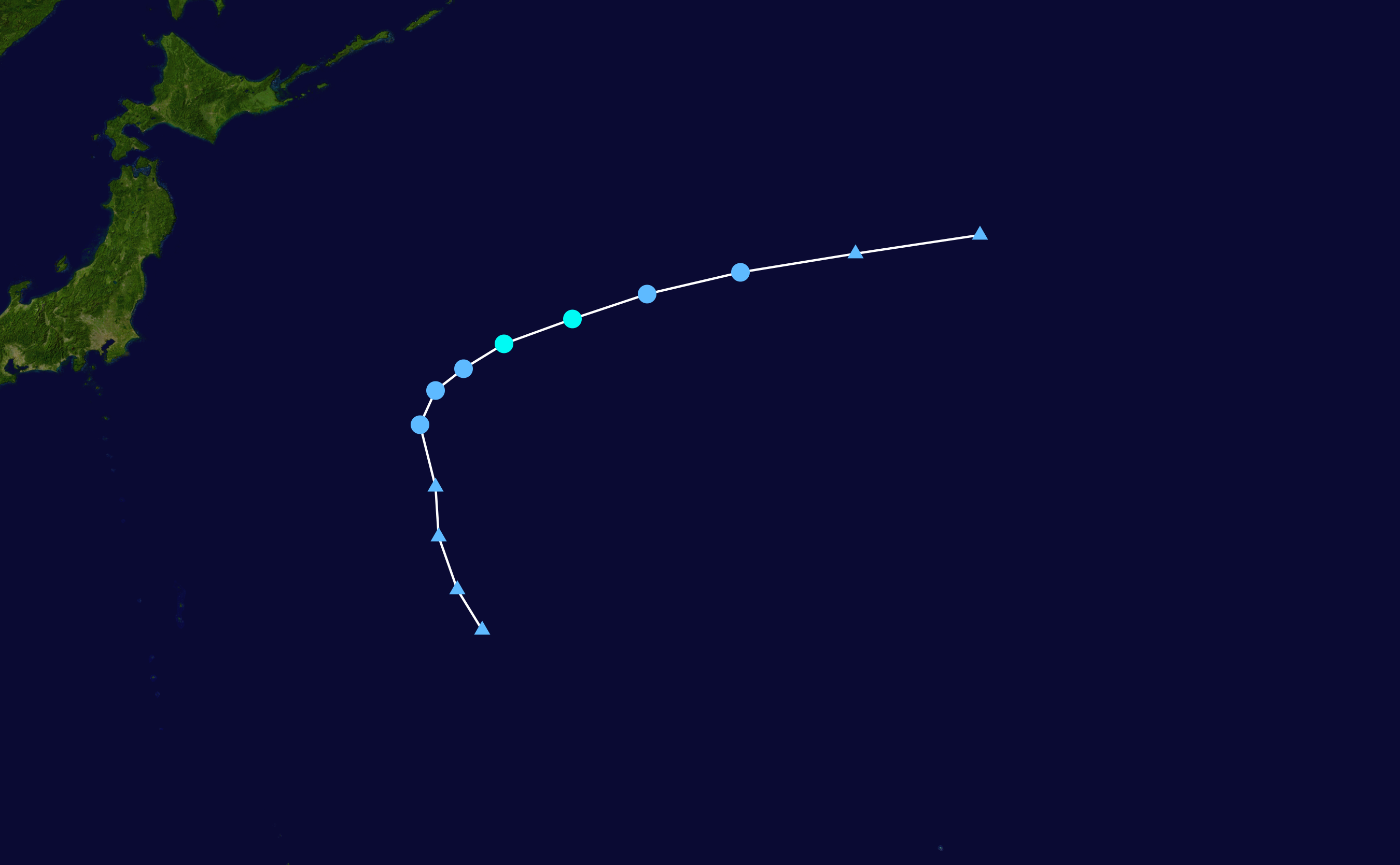
- Duration: September 10 – September 12
- Peak intensity: 65 km/h (40 mph) (1-min); 1008 hPa (mbar)

During September 8, the JTWC started to monitor a tropical disturbance that had developed about 1,210 km (750 mi) to the west of Iwo To. Moving northward in a few days, the JTWC assessed that the system had strengthened into Tropical Depression 17W. Despite its LLCC remaining small, satellite imagery showed that 17W produced persistent convection and some spiral banding. Later, drier air surrounded the depression as it was now firmly embedded with the west-southwesterly flow ahead of the mid-latitude frontal zone. The JTWC issued their final advisory on 17W on September 12, as the system was rapidly deteriorating due to vertical wind shear, and weakened into a remnant low. Its remnants was later absorbed by a front near the International Date Line, late on September 14.

In the JMA's post-analysis, 17W was recognized as a tropical depression, and the system was first noted on September 10.

=== Tropical Storm Rai ===
- Tropical storm (JMA)
- Tropical depression (SSHWS)
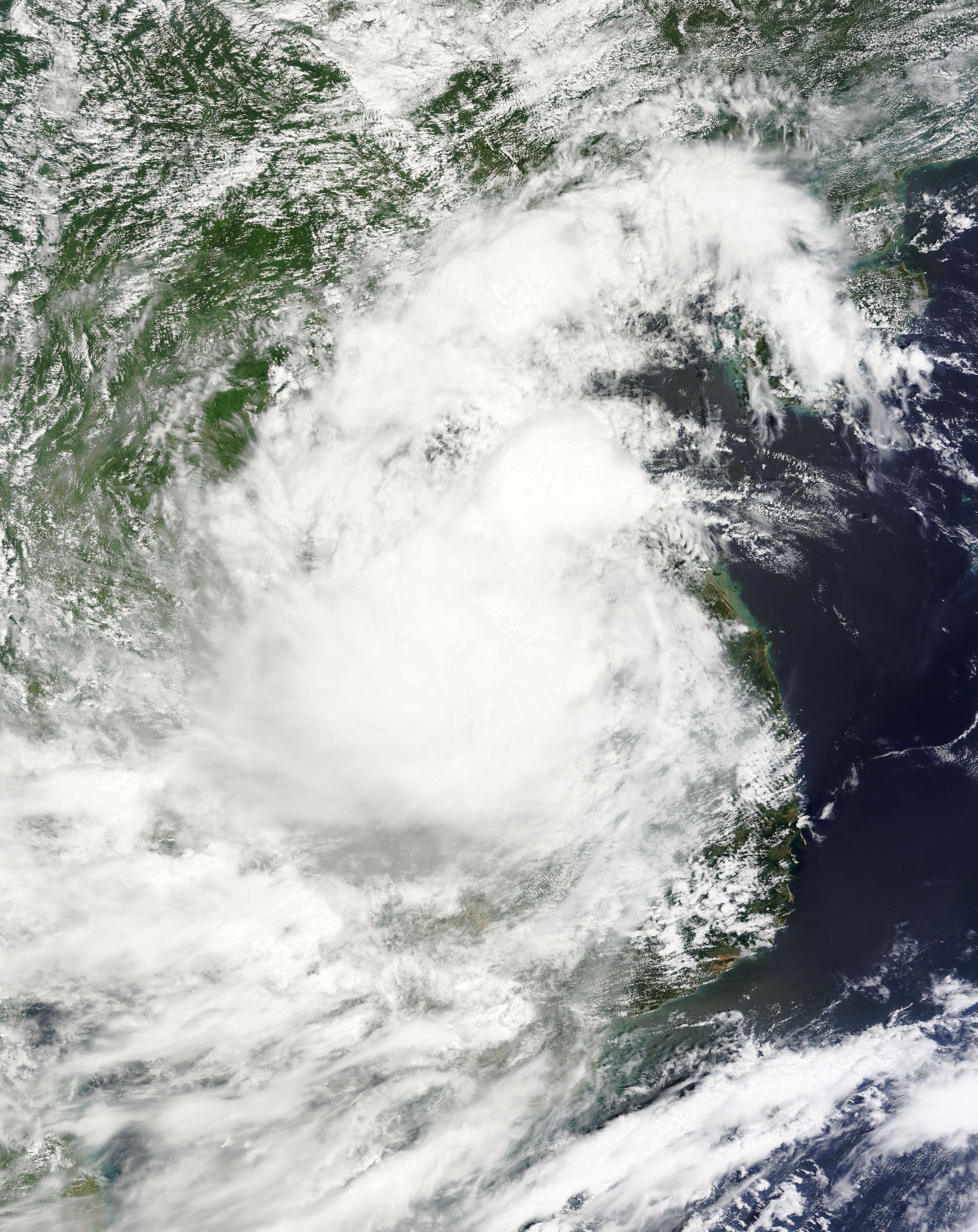
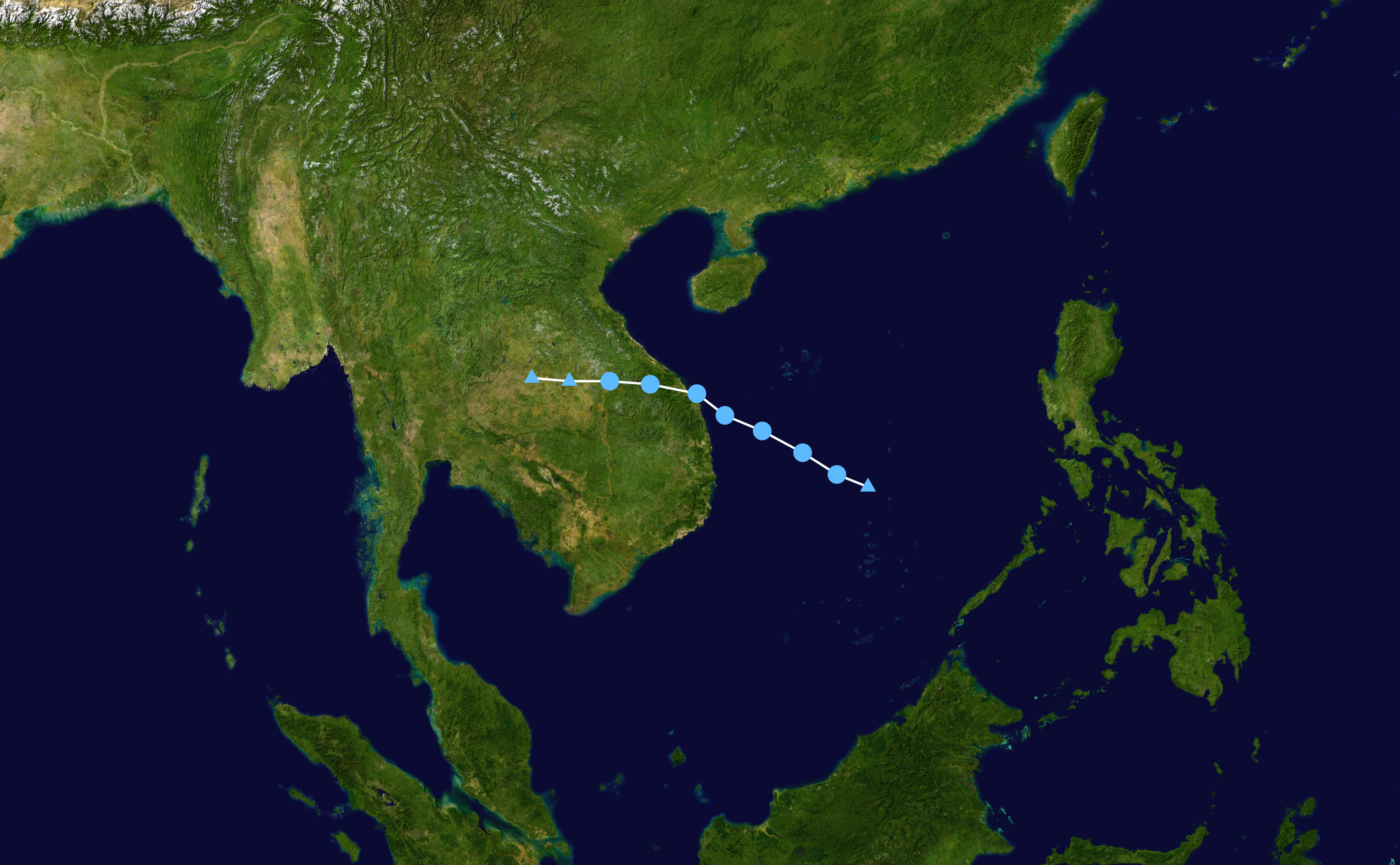
- Duration: September 11 – September 13
- Peak intensity: 65 km/h (40 mph) (10-min); 996 hPa (mbar)

On September 11, a tropical depression formed within an unfavourable environment for further development, about 860 km (535 mi) to the northeast of Ho Chi Minh City, Vietnam. Satellite imagery then showed that the LLCC of 19W was broad and defined with some deep convective banding. Its LLCC became exposed, though its deep convection remained in place. Although the JMA declared that 19W had strengthened into a tropical storm, the JTWC deemed the system to not have reached tropical storm intensity. Rai made landfall over Central Vietnam, about 94 km (58 mi) southeast of the city of Da Nang. Rai degraded to a tropical depression six hours later.

Heavy rains in Central Vietnam and Northern Thailand caused flooding and the bursting of the Bung River 2 hydroelectricity plant in Quảng Nam province of Vietnam, which released 28 million cubic meters of water and washed away 2 workers. Four ships were sunk along central Vietnam's coastline and 2 others were left stranded, while 5 houses were completely destroyed and 275 others had their roofs torn off. Most of the damage occurred in Nghệ An Province due to flooding, amounting to about ₫748 billion (US$33.6 million). In total, Rai caused 12 deaths and damages amounting to ₫825 billion (US$37 million).

=== Typhoon Malakas (Gener) ===
- Very strong typhoon (JMA)
- Category 4 typhoon (SSHWS)
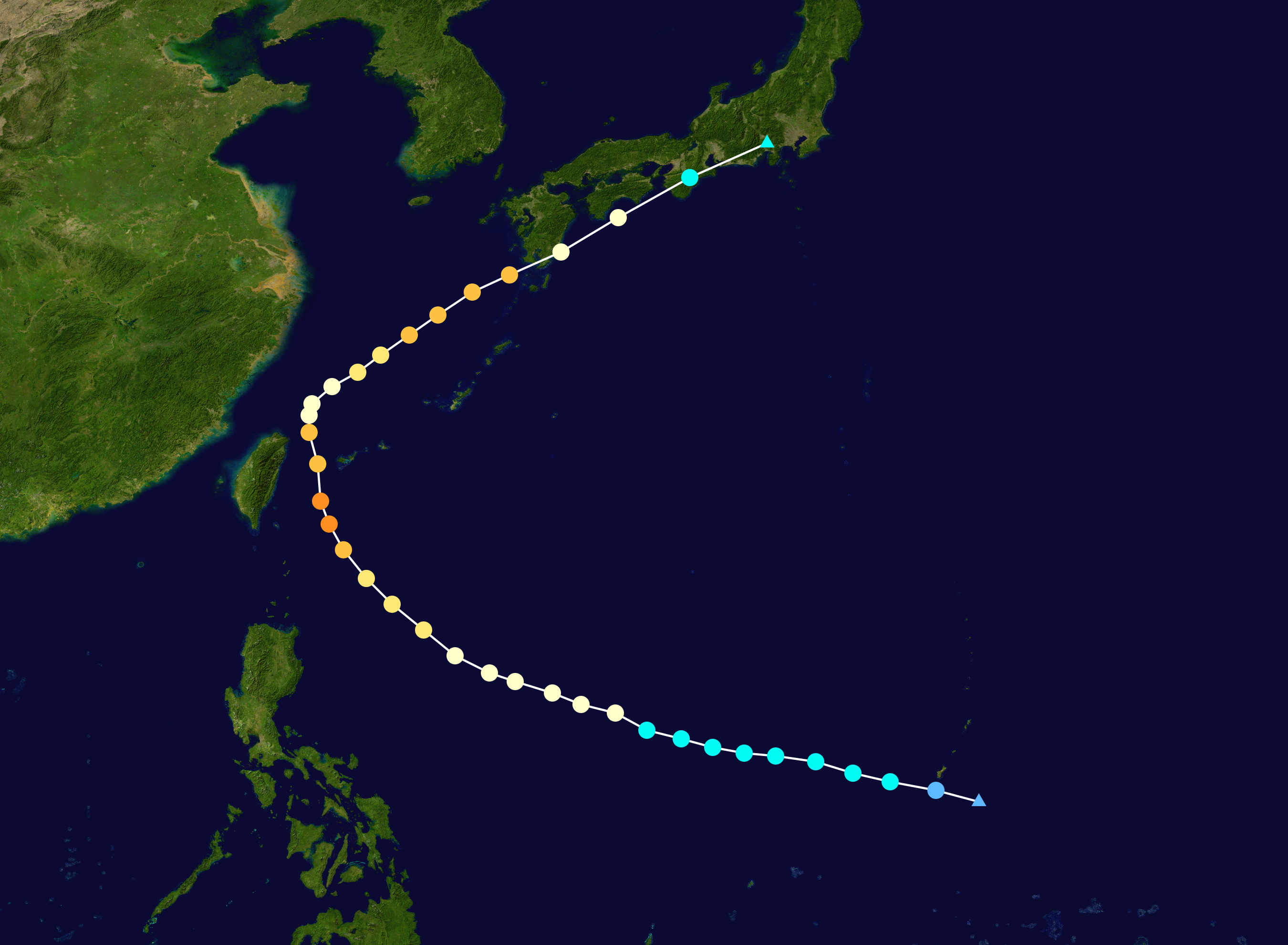
- Duration: September 11 – September 20
- Peak intensity: 175 km/h (110 mph) (10-min); 930 hPa (mbar)

On September 11, a tropical depression formed approximately 58 km (36 mi) south of Hagåtña, Guam. On becoming a tropical storm, it was named Malakas. By September 13, Malakas had improved in its organization and became a severe tropical storm thereafter. At the same time, Malakas had entered the Philippine area of Responsibility, with PAGASA assigning the local name Gener. Despite hindrance by the outflow of nearby Typhoon Meranti, Malakas intensified into a typhoon.

On September 16, Malakas rapidly intensified into a Category 4 typhoon. Malakas reached its peak intensity with 1-minute sustained winds of 215 km/h (135 mph), 10-minute sustained winds of 175 km/h (110 mph), and a pressure of 930 hPa (27.46 inHg) by the following day. Shortly thereafter, its eye became cloud-filled and ragged, signalling the onset of weakening. After weakening to a Category 2 typhoon, Malakas reintensified to a Category 3 typhoon by September 19. Malakas then resumed weakening due to land interaction with Japan. By the following day, Malakas weakened below typhoon intensity, and became extratropical.

At around 00:00 JST on September 20 (15:00 UTC on September 19), Malakas made landfall over the Ōsumi Peninsula in Japan. It subsequently crossed Cape Muroto at around 11:00 JST (02:00 UTC) and made landfall over Tanabe at around 13:30 JST (04:30 UTC).

=== Typhoon Megi (Helen) ===
- Very strong typhoon (JMA)
- Category 4 typhoon (SSHWS)
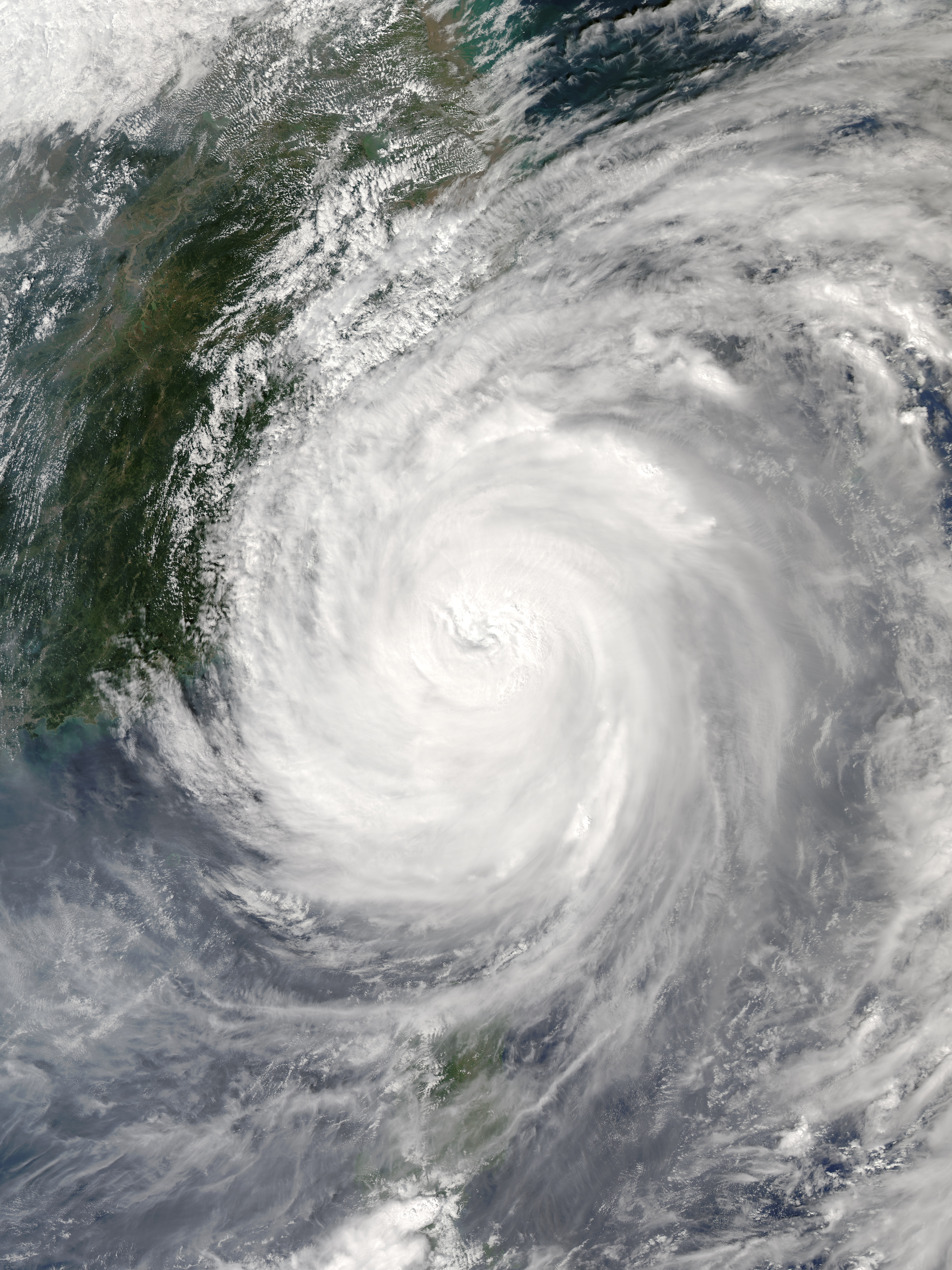
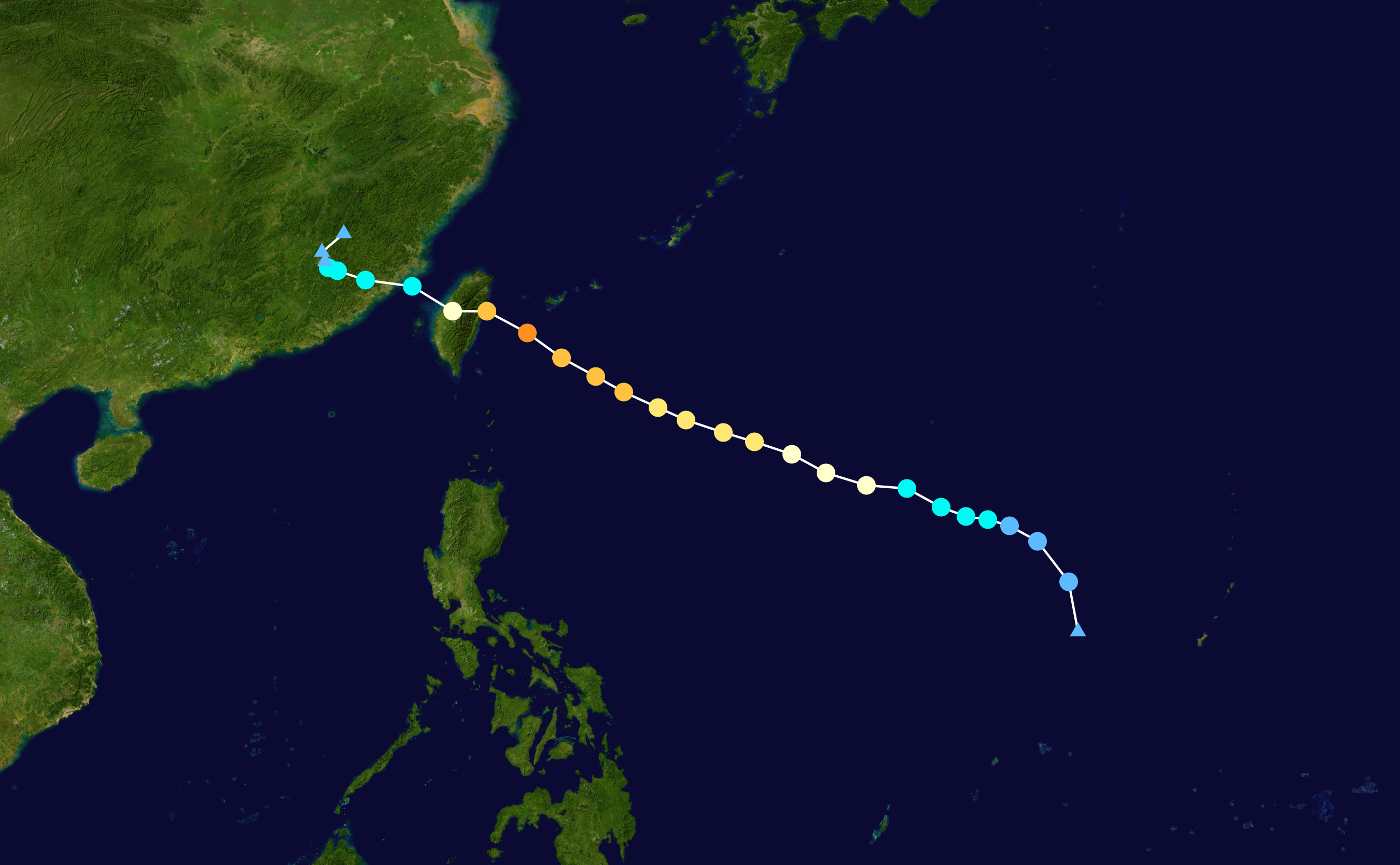
- Duration: September 22 – September 29
- Peak intensity: 155 km/h (100 mph) (10-min); 945 hPa (mbar)

Megi originated as a tropical depression about 722 km (449 mi) east-southeast of Guam on September 21. The depression became a tropical storm by on September 23. On the following day, Megi intensified to a severe tropical storm. On developing an eye, Megi reached typhoon intensity. Shortly thereafter, Megi entered PAGASA's area of responsibility, and the local name Helen was assigned. After a day of slight intensification, Megi started to undergo an eyewall replacement cycle. From then on, Megi rapidly intensified as it neared the coast of Taiwan. Megi reached peak intensity as a Category 3 typhoon over Taiwan with 1-minute sustained winds of 205 km/h (125 mph), 10-minute sustained winds of 155 km/h (95 mph), and a minimum barometric pressure of 945 mbar late on September 26. Early on September 27, Megi made landfall over Hualien City, weakening due to land interaction. Megi made landfall over in Hui'an County of Quanzhou the next day. Megi continued deteriorating as it moved inland.

In Taiwan, government officials announced that 814 school campuses across Taiwan were damaged, at an estimated cost of NT$161 million (US$4.17 million). In all, 8 people were killed in Taiwan, and total economic losses were counted to be NT$3.36 billion (US$106.9 million). Meanwhile, 44 people were killed in mainland China, and total damages were amounted to CNY9.7 billion (US$1.45 billion).

=== Typhoon Chaba (Igme) ===
- Violent typhoon (JMA)
- Category 5 super typhoon (SSHWS)
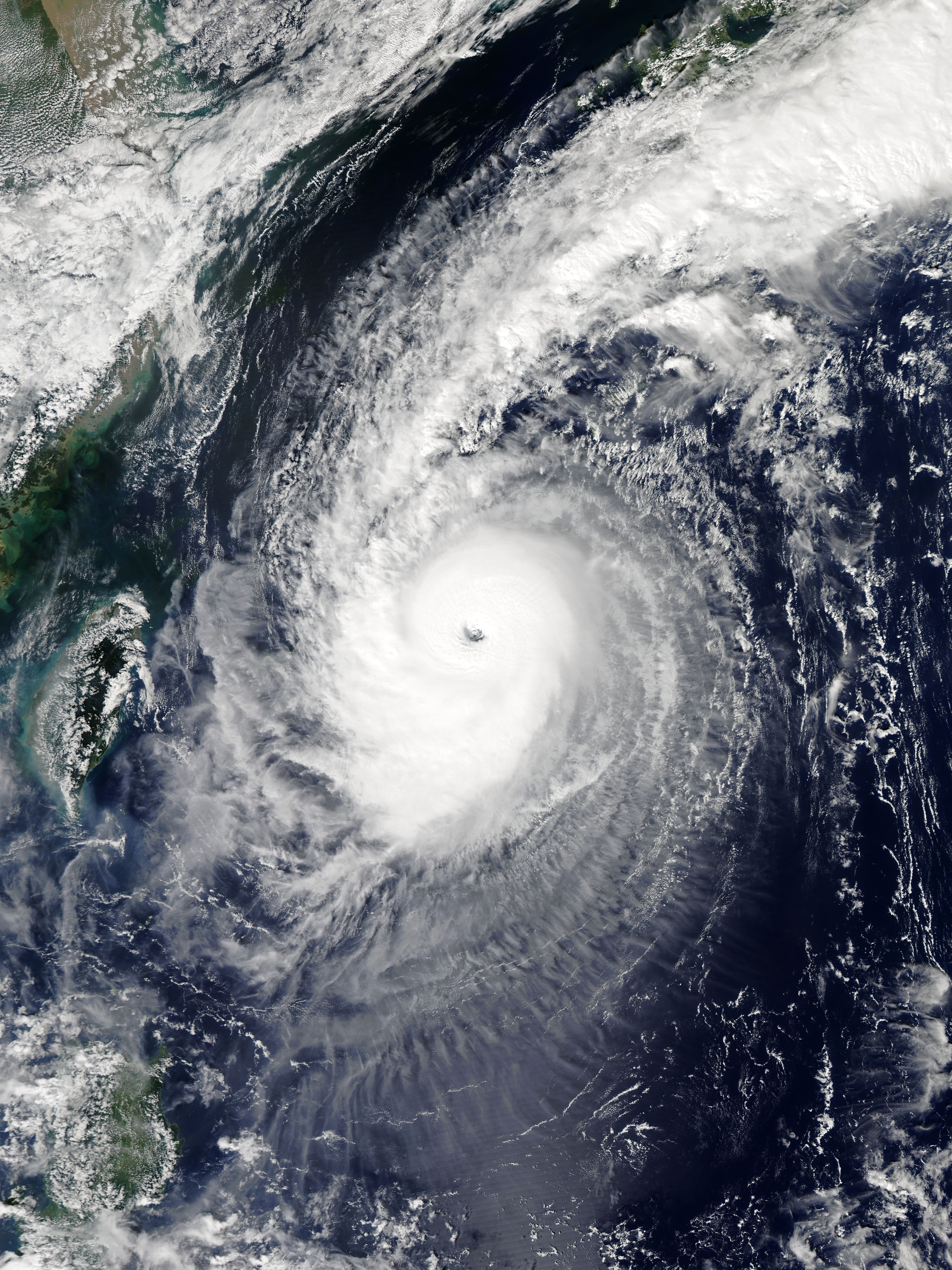
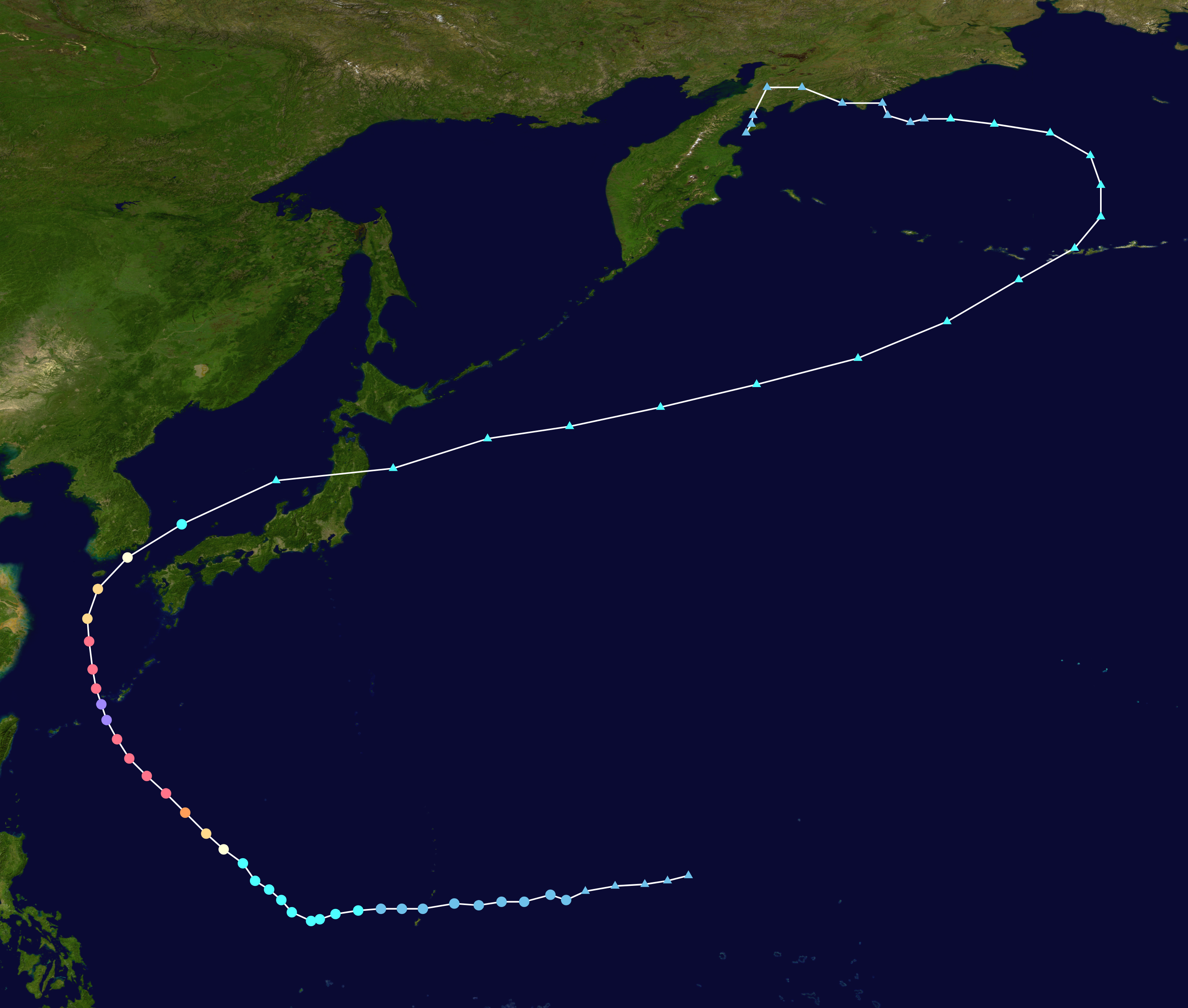
- Duration: September 24 – October 5
- Peak intensity: 215 km/h (130 mph) (10-min); 905 hPa (mbar)

On September 24, a weak tropical depression had developed approximately 1,445 km (898 mi) east-northeast of Guam. The system reached tropical storm status and was assigned the name Chaba late the next day. By September 30, Chaba had intensified into a severe tropical storm after deep convection had evolved into a banding feature, under very favorable conditions. During October 1, Chaba entered the Philippine area of responsibility, with PAGASA giving the local name Igme, as it started to move in a northwestward direction. Chaba became a typhoon after its organization and structure vastly improved. During the next day, Chaba began explosive intensification, reaching Category 5 super typhoon intensity with a sharp 5 nmi (9.3 km; 5.8 mi) wide eye. Chaba reached its peak intensity with 10-minute sustained winds of 215 km/h (135 mph), while 1-minute sustained winds were at 280 km/h (175 mph), and the minimum central pressure was 905 mbar. Thereafter, Chaba began to weaken as its core became asymmetric, due to strong wind shear. As it neared the coast of Busan, South Korea, Chaba transitioned into an extratropical cyclone.

The storm left widespread damage across the southern regions of South Korea, killing at least 7 and leaving 4 others missing. Transportation was disrupted, with hundreds of flights canceled, while more than 200,000 households lost electricity. Chaba was the strongest typhoon to strike the country since Typhoon Sanba in 2012.

=== Typhoon Songda ===
- Very strong typhoon (JMA)
- Category 4 super typhoon (SSHWS)
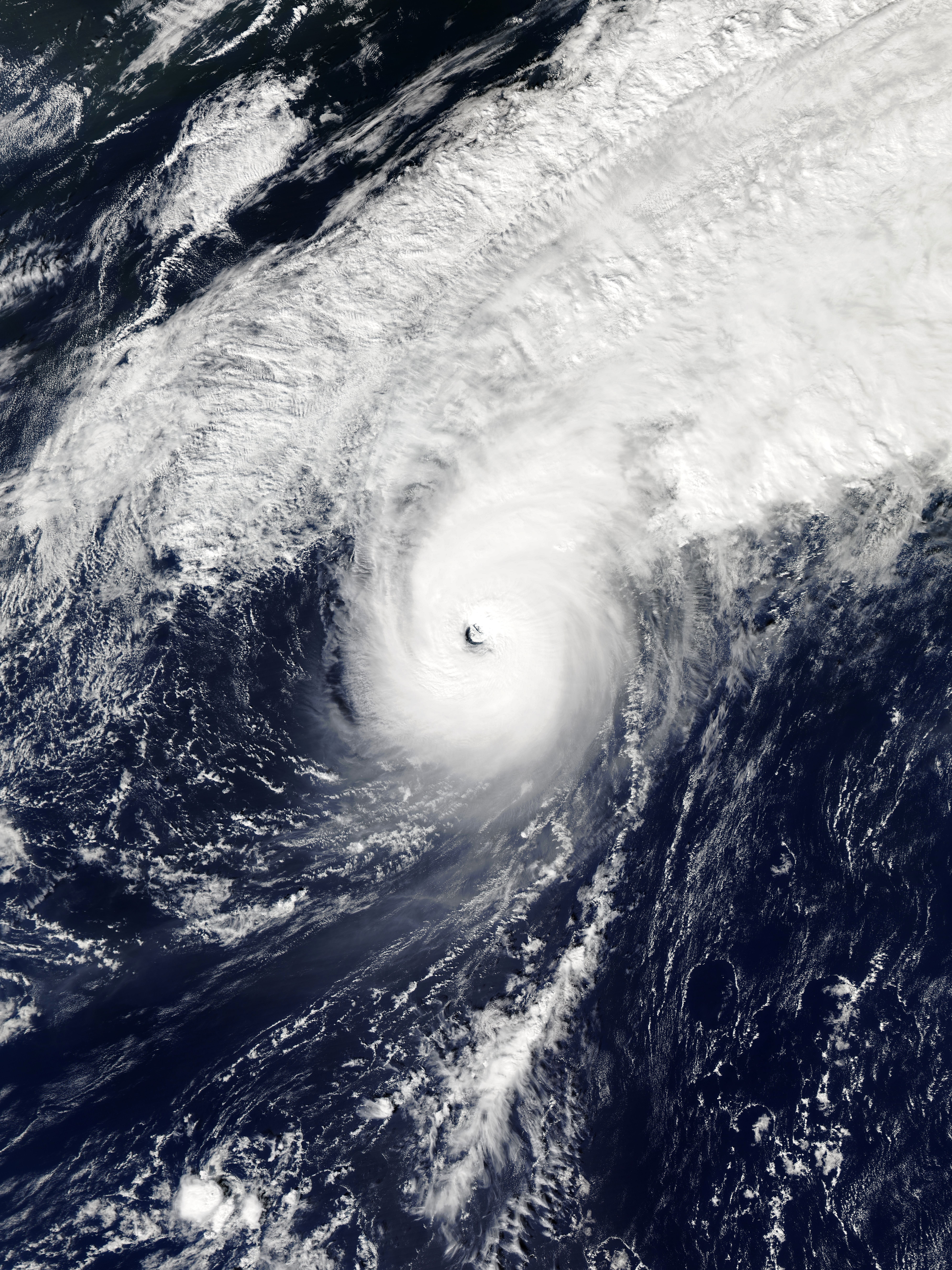
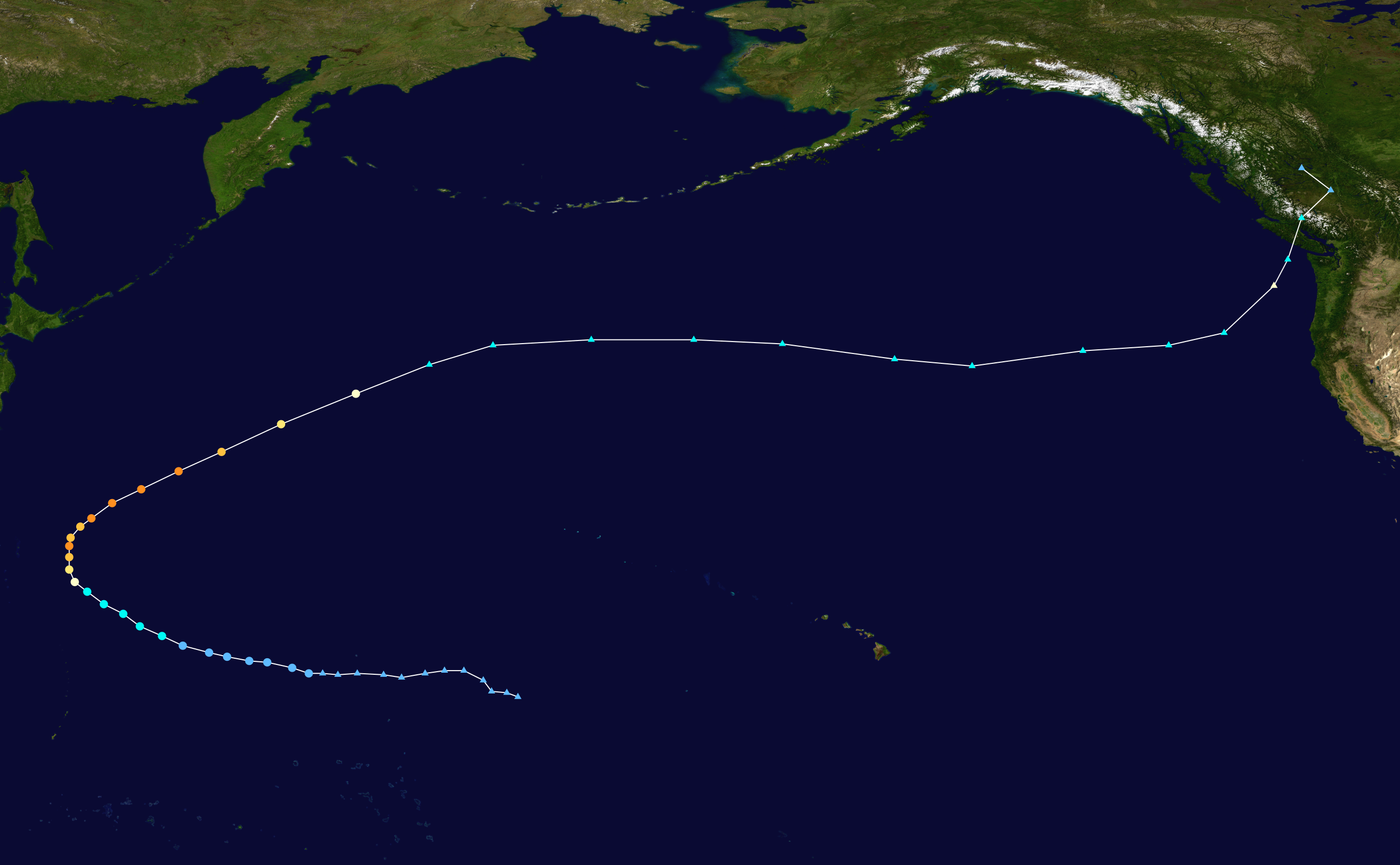
- Duration: October 4 (Entered basin) – October 13
- Peak intensity: 185 km/h (115 mph) (10-min); 925 hPa (mbar)

A tropical disturbance entered the basin from the Central Pacific late on October 3 and on the following day, became a tropical depression approximately 1,333 km (828 mi) east-southeast of Wake Island. After moving westward for several days, 23W intensified into a tropical storm, with the JMA giving the name Songda. By October 9, an eye feature became apparent in microwave imagery, and Songda reached severe tropical storm intensity. Six hours later, Songda intensified into a typhoon. Songda started to undergo rapid deepening, while forming a ragged eye.

Songda eventually reached its peak intensity as a Category 4 super typhoon, despite 25-30 kt vertical wind shear, with 10-minute sustained winds of 185 km/h (115 mph) and a minimum pressure of 925 mbar. Shortly thereafter, Songda rapidly weakened as the wind shear increased further, and its eye became cloud-filled. The JTWC issued its final advisory, classifying Songda as a rapidly-weakening Category 3-equivalent typhoon. The storm was embedded within the deep mid-latitude westerlies and located over waters cooler than 26 °C (79 °F). The JMA downgraded Songda to a severe tropical storm in its final advisory on October 13, and Songda subsequently transitioned into an extratropical cyclone. The extratropical remnant of Songda went on to affect the west coast of North America with heavy rain and winds.

=== Severe Tropical Storm Aere (Julian) ===
- Severe tropical storm (JMA)
- Tropical storm (SSHWS)
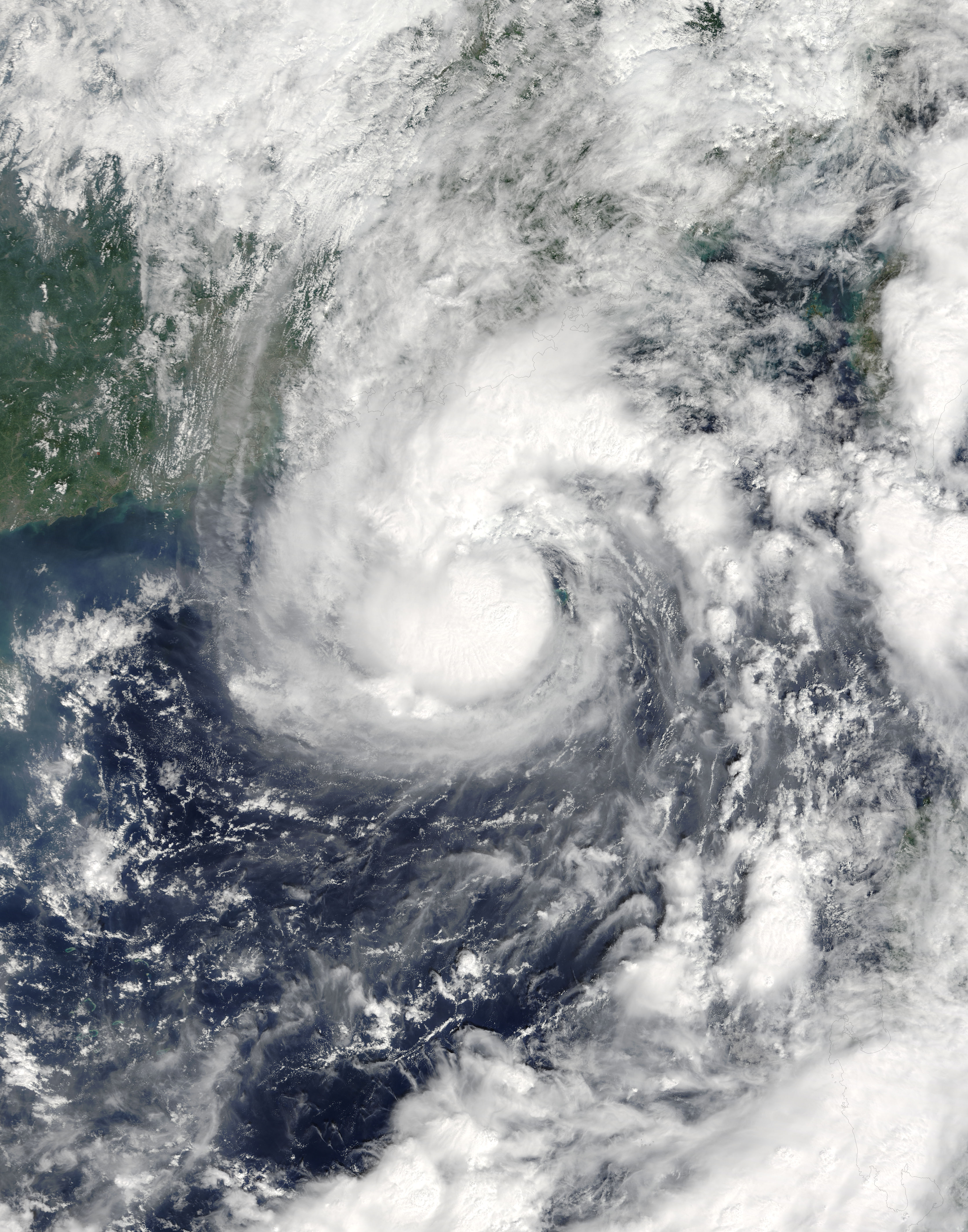
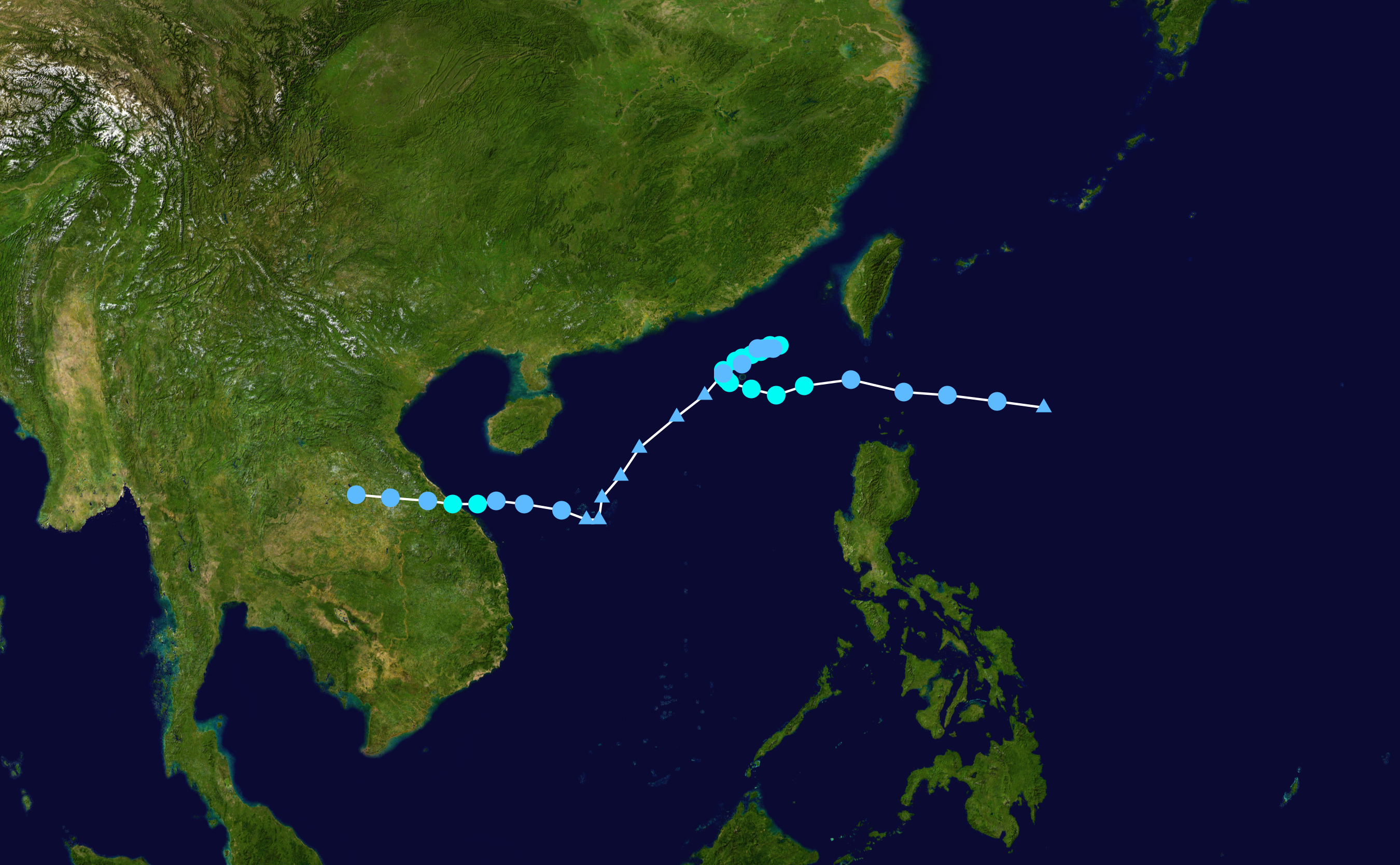
- Duration: October 4 – October 14
- Peak intensity: 110 km/h (70 mph) (10-min); 975 hPa (mbar)

Shortly after Songda's formation, another tropical depression developed well east to the Babuyan Group of Islands. Later that day, PAGASA named the system Julian. Despite Julian's disorganised structure, conditions were favourable for development, with light to moderate wind shear and very warm sea surface temperatures. After a significant increase of convection, the system became a tropical storm, receiving the name Aere. Aere became a severe tropical storm the following day. Shortly thereafter, Aere reached itspeak intensity with 10-minute winds of 110 km/h (70 mph), just shy of typhoon strength. Upwelling induced weakening, and Aere weakened to a tropical storm. By October 10, Aere's LLCC became exposed due to southwesterly wind shear, and Aere degenerated to a tropical depression. The JMA tracked its remnants as it moved southwestward until it weakened to a low-pressure area late on October 11.

On October 13, the well-marked low-pressure area of Aere re-generated into a tropical depression, and was tracked by the JMA until it fully dissipated on October 14.

Most of the damage was reported mainly in Vietnam, especially in the central region, where estimated damages for transport works were at 130 billion ₫ (US$5.83 million). A total of 25 houses were destroyed while 949 were damaged. In agriculture, 3.14 ha of rice and 11.5 ha of crops were damaged. In total, flooding by the storm caused ₫ 4.6 trillion (US$209 million) of damage.

=== Typhoon Sarika (Karen) ===
- Very strong typhoon (JMA)
- Category 4 typhoon (SSHWS)
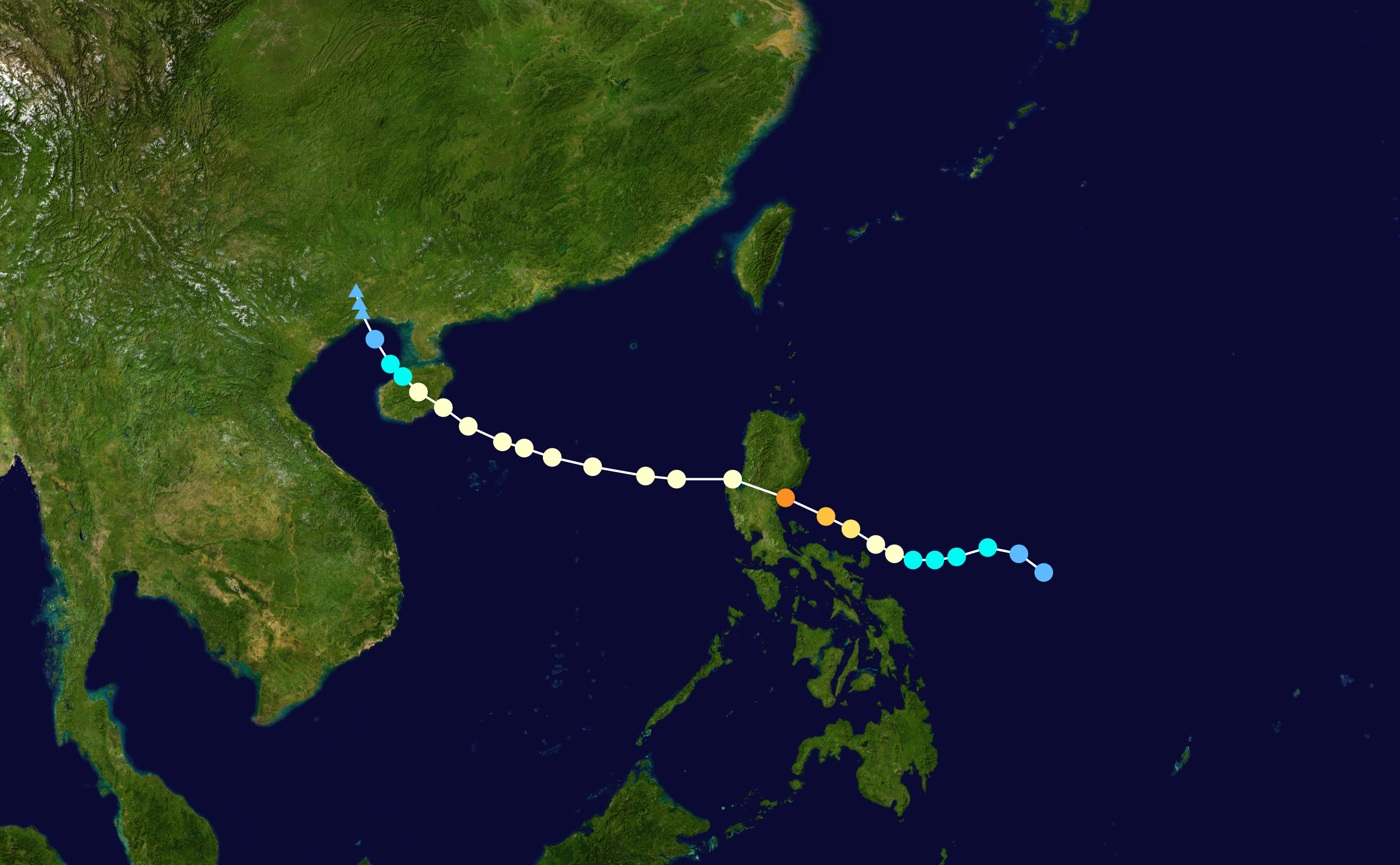
- Duration: October 13 – October 19
- Peak intensity: 175 km/h (110 mph) (10-min); 935 hPa (mbar)

Sarika was first noted as a tropical depression located about 1,200 km (750 mi) east-southeast of Manila, Philippines. When 24W entered their area of responsibility, PAGASA assigned it the local name Karen. By October 13, images depicted a broad LLCC; sea surface temperatures were high, at 31 °C (88 °F). Hours later, the system became a tropical storm, with the JMA naming it as Sarika. Sarika continued organizing and reached severe tropical storm intensity. Several hours later, Sarika started to form an eye feature as it became a typhoon. The storm eventually reached its peak intensity as a Category 4 typhoon with 1-minute sustained winds of 215 km/h (135 mph) and a minimum barometric pressure of 935 mbar. Early on October 16, Sarika made landfall over in Baler, Aurora. Dramatic weakening occurred as Sarika traversed the islands. After moving westward rapidly for two days, Sarika weakened to a severe tropical storm as it made landfall over in Hainan. Sarika continued weakening as it made its final landfall over the border of Vietnam and China, and dissipated later that day.

Nearly 13,000 homes were damaged or destroyed, and more than 200,000 people were displaced. Agricultural damage in the Philippines was severe, totaling ₱3.63 billion (US$76.4 million). (Note: All currencies are in their 2016 values and are converted to United States dollars using data from the International Monetary Fund published by the World Bank.)

=== Typhoon Haima (Lawin) ===
- Violent typhoon (JMA)
- Category 5 super typhoon (SSHWS)
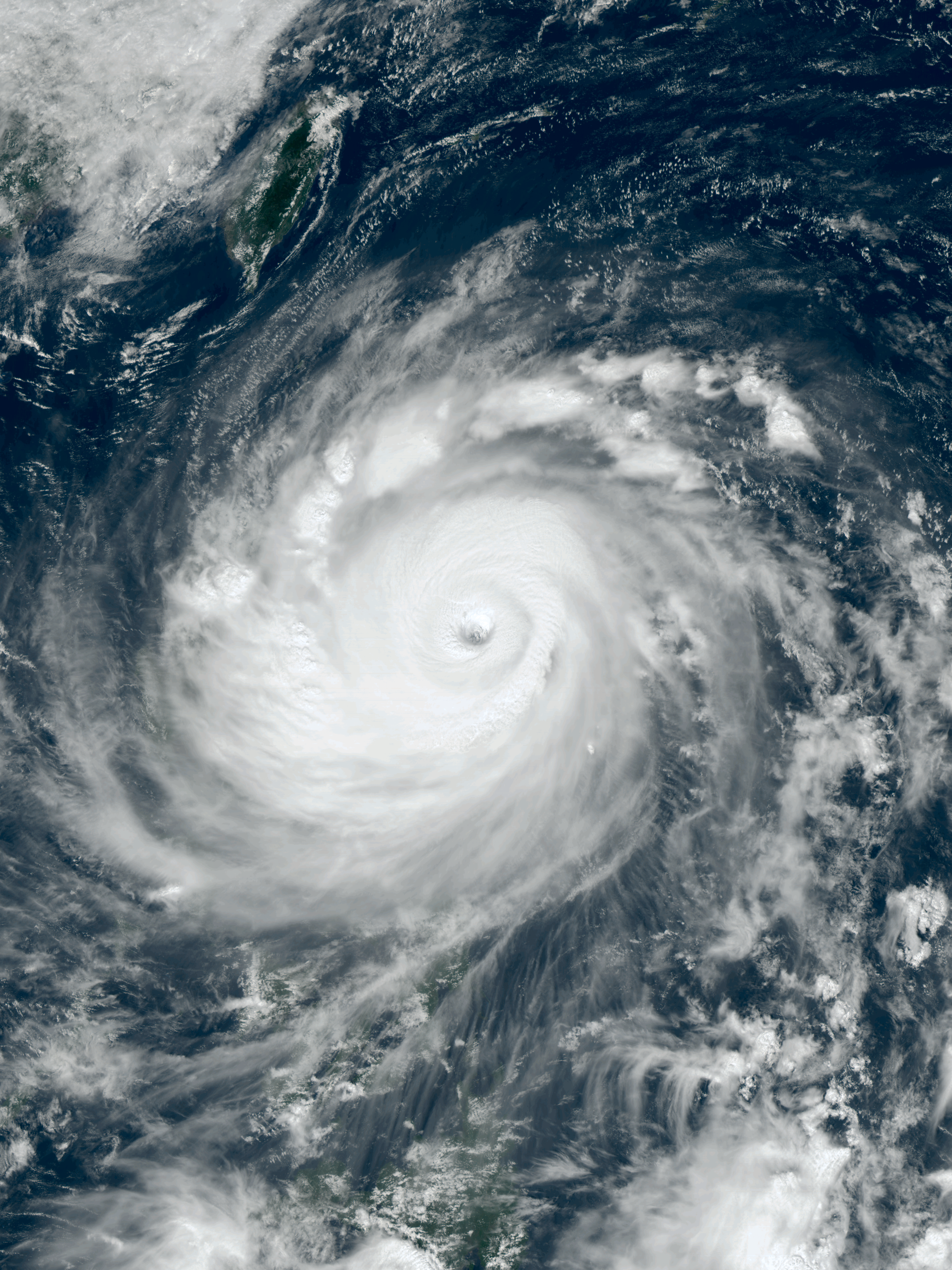
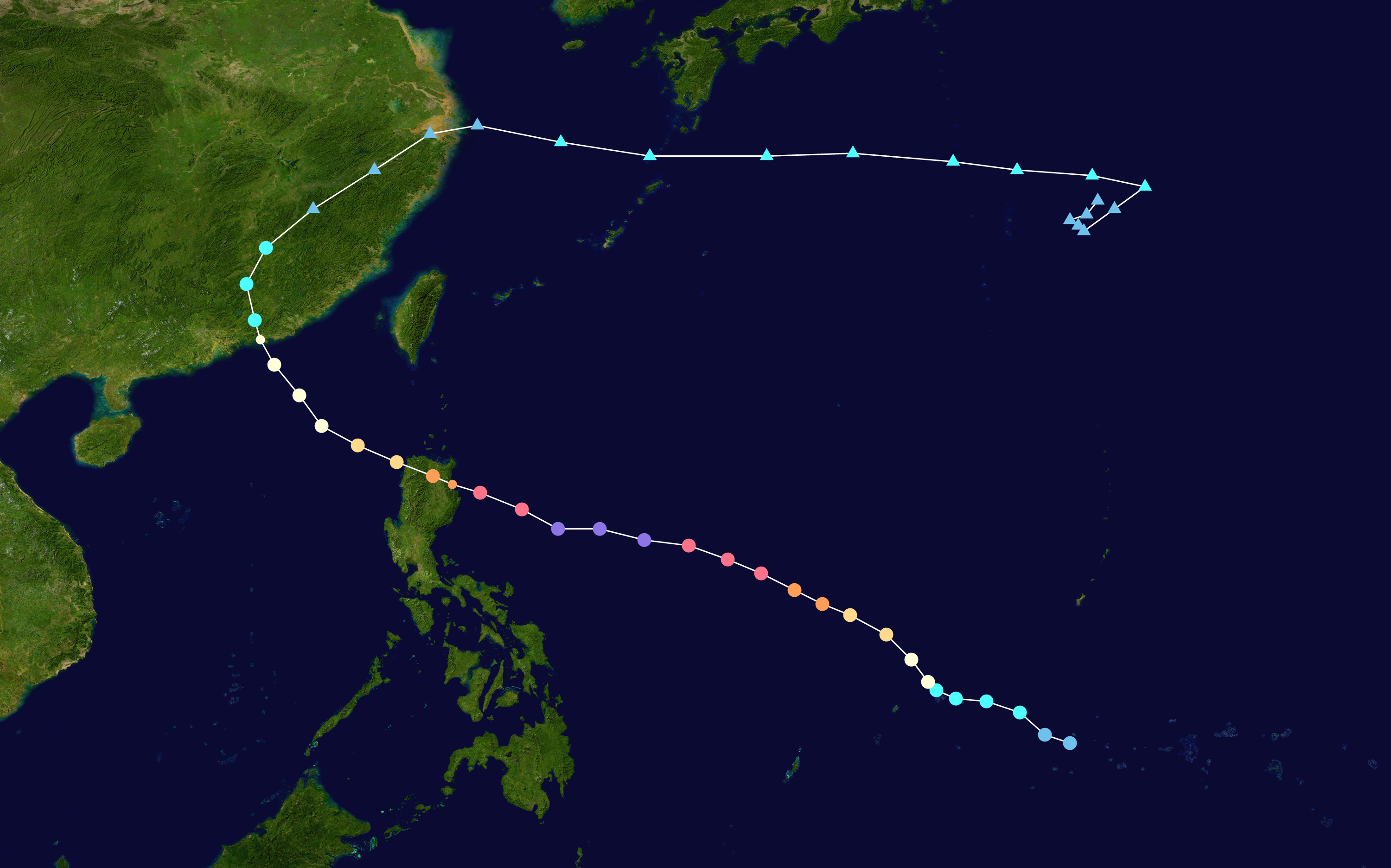
- Duration: October 14 – October 21
- Peak intensity: 215 km/h (130 mph) (10-min); 900 hPa (mbar)

During October 14, the JMA and JTWC reported that a tropical depression had developed about 700 km (435 mi) within the Caroline Islands to the south of Guam. During that day the depressions low level circulation center rapidly consolidated, while bands of atmospheric convection built and wrapped into the center. As a result, both warning centers reported that the depression had developed into a tropical storm, early the next day with the JMA naming it as Haima.

Early on October 15, the depression intensified into a tropical storm and was assigned the name Haima. At this point of time, Haima was located in a very favorable environment with very high ocean heat content, very low wind shear and warm SSTs. Three hours later, Haima intensified into a severe tropical storm. With very good radial outflow, and still being situated in an extremely favorable environment, Haima rapidly intensified into a Category 4 super typhoon. By the end of the time, PAGASA announced the Haima had entered their area of responsibility, assigning it the name Lawin. Haima continued to intensify, reaching Category 5 super typhoon status by late on October 18. Super Typhoon Haima (Lawin) intensified further. PAGASA used the term "super typhoon" on Haima for the first time since it was introduced in May 2015 due to Typhoon Haiyan's ravage during 2013. PAGASA also raised Signal #5 in the provinces of Cagayan and Isabela, which made it a hazardous storm. Due to land interaction, Typhoon Haima weakened into a Category 4 storm and made landfall in Peñablanca, Cagayan. Typhoon Haima weakened after landfall in the Philippines and landed in Hong Kong as a weakened Category 1 storm, in which Signal no. 8 was raised. By October 22, Haima became extratropical and dissipated on October 26.

Total damages in the Philippines were at ₱3.74 billion (US$77.6 million).

=== Typhoon Meari ===
- Typhoon (JMA)
- Category 2 typhoon (SSHWS)
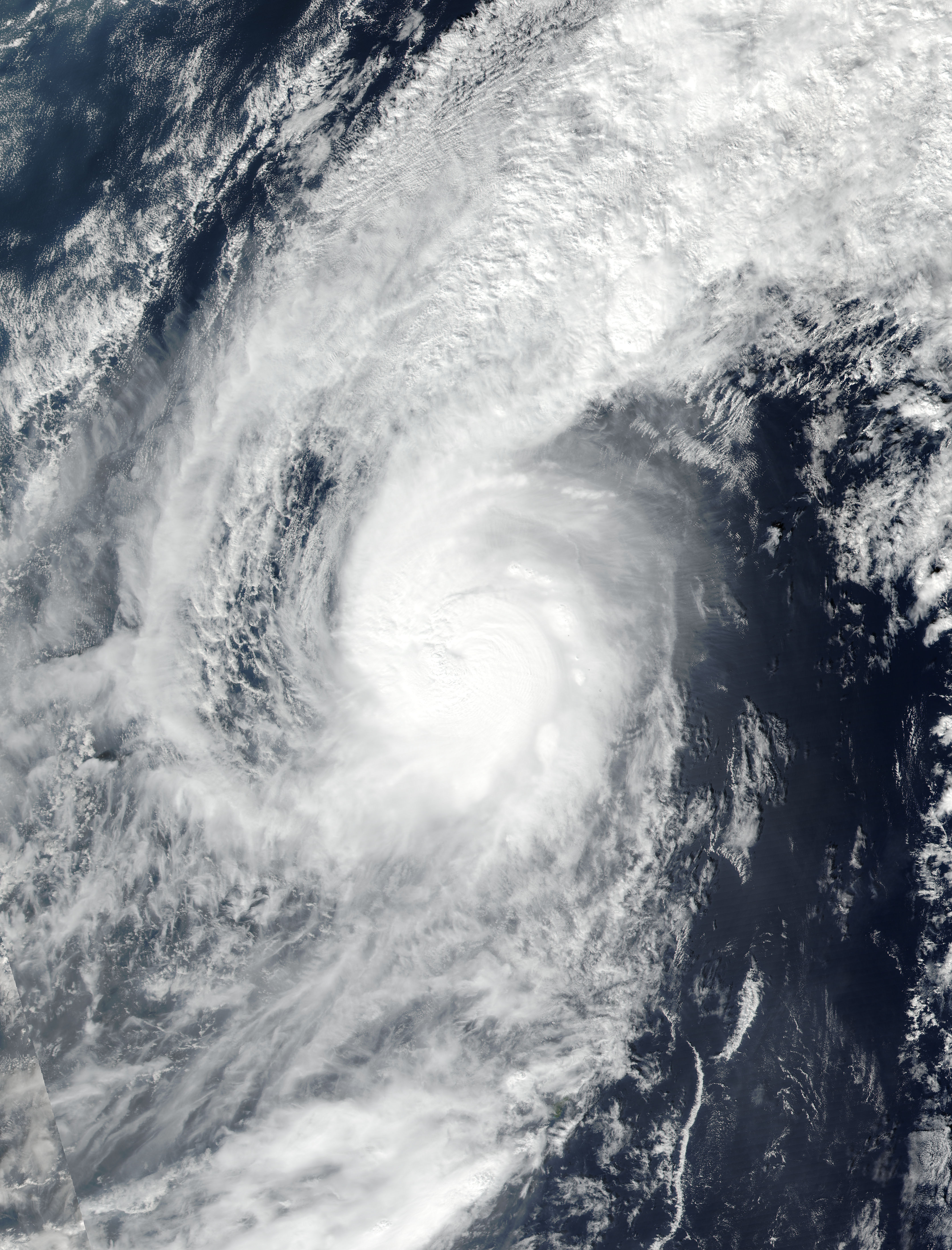
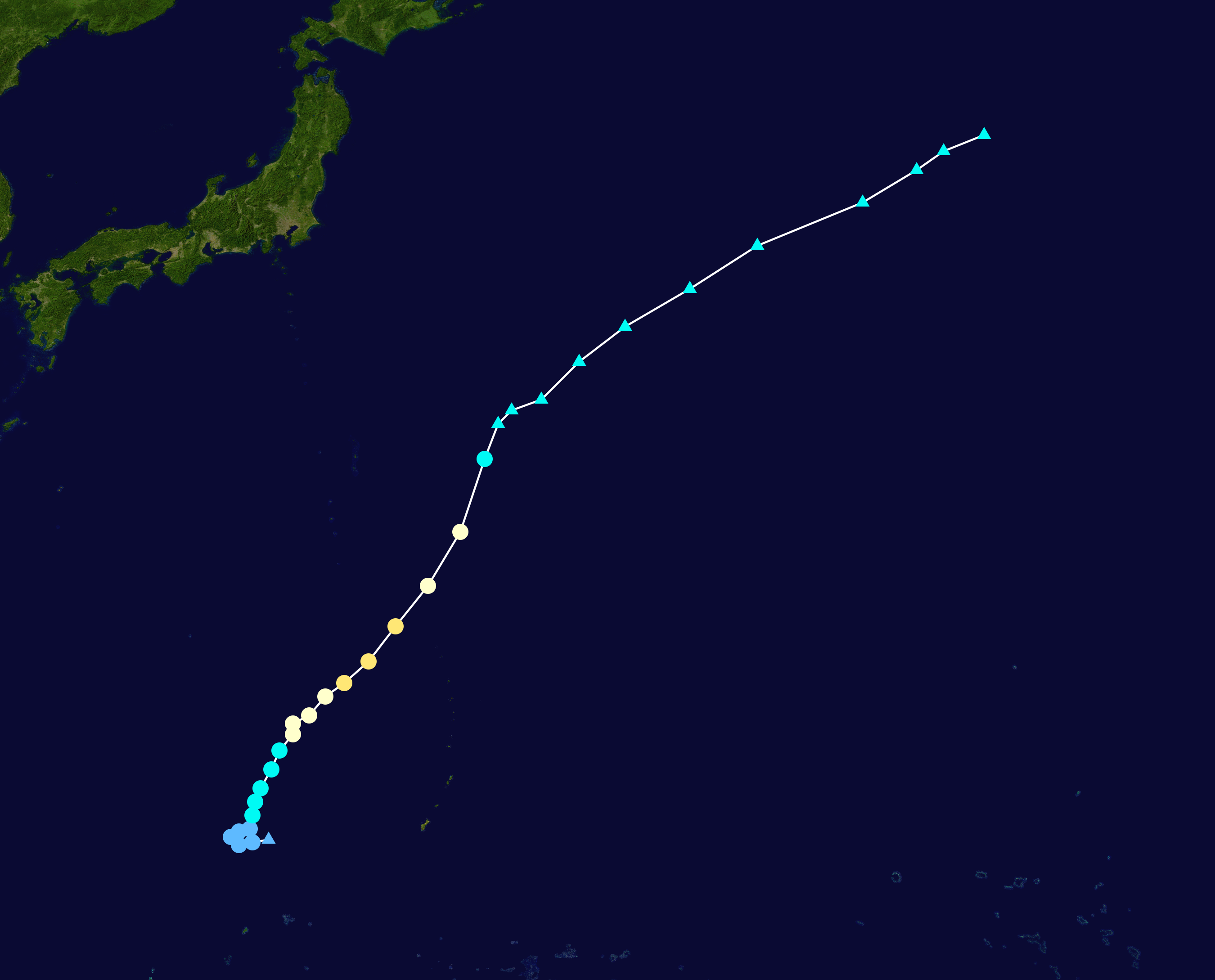
- Duration: October 30 – November 7
- Peak intensity: 140 km/h (85 mph) (10-min); 960 hPa (mbar)

On October 31, the JMA started to track a tropical depression about 287 km (178 mi) south of Guam. Late on November 2, organization had increased as the JTWC upgraded the system to a tropical depression with the identifier of 26W. The JMA, however, had upgraded 26W to a tropical storm, giving the name Meari early on the next day. With a rapidly consolidating LLCC, the JTWC followed suit of upgrading to a tropical storm. By November 4, now moving northward, feeder bands were covering its very broad and compact LLCC and therefore Meari intensified into a severe tropical storm. Hours later, deep convective banding with a central dense overcast (CDO) seen from satellite imagery prompted the JTWC and the JMA to upgrade Meari to a typhoon. On the next day, organization ensued with deep convection wrapping into its center and its CDO feature becoming more symmetric. Meari intensified into a Category 2 typhoon. During the course of November 6, Meari reached peak intensity only as a Category 2 with 10-minute sustained winds of 155 km/h (95 mph) and a minimum barometric pressure of 955 mbar.

Later that day, Meari started to move northeastward rapidly with a strong poleward outflow as it started to interact with high vertical wind shear. The JTWC downgraded Meari to a Category 1. On November 7, the JTWC issued its final advisory on Meari due to the fact that its convective structure had become frontal, therefore it had already transitioned into an extratropical cyclone. The JMA followed suit three hours later. Meari's extratropical remnants was later absorbed by another but larger extratropical cyclone early on November 10.

=== Tropical Depression ===
- Tropical depression (JMA)
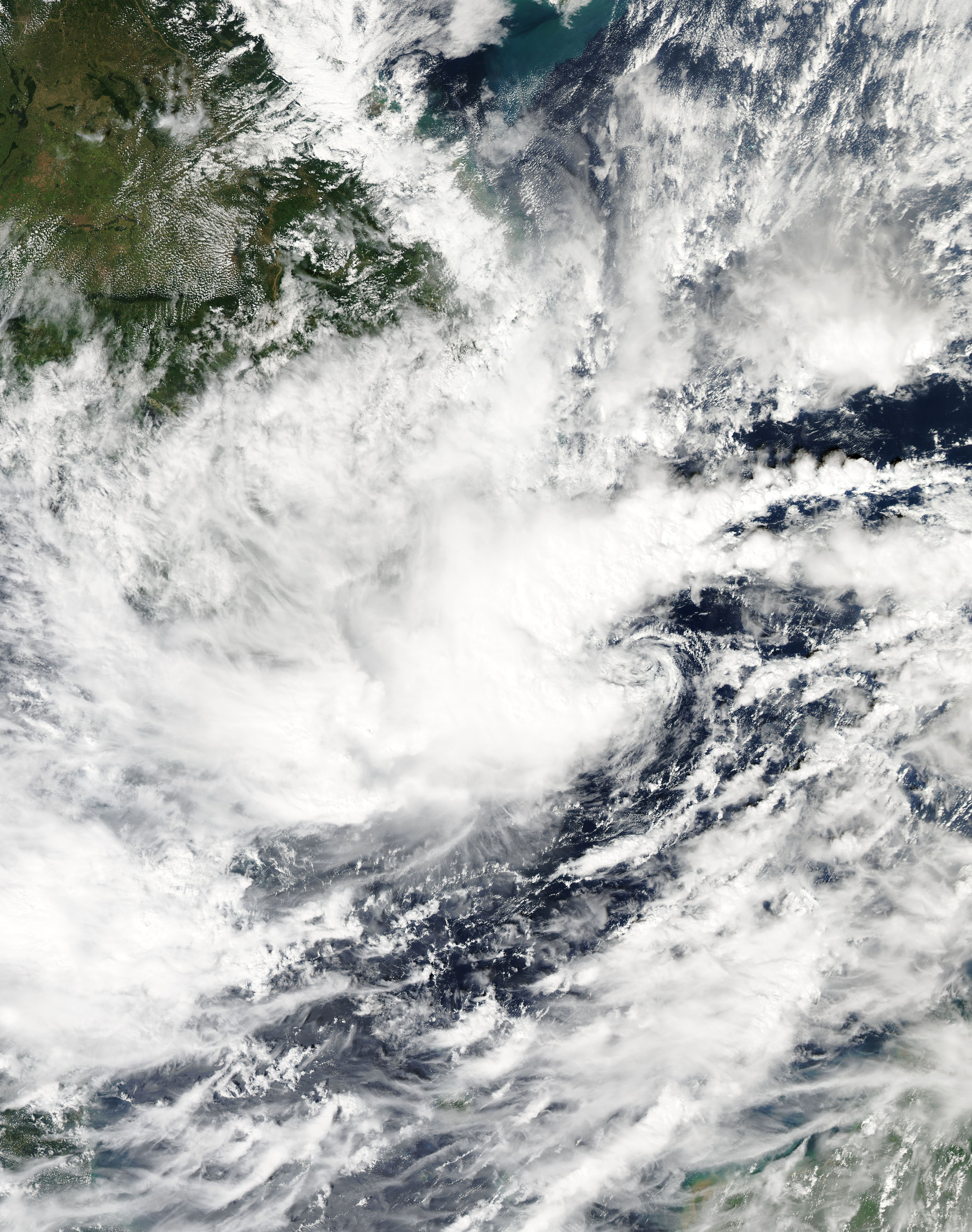
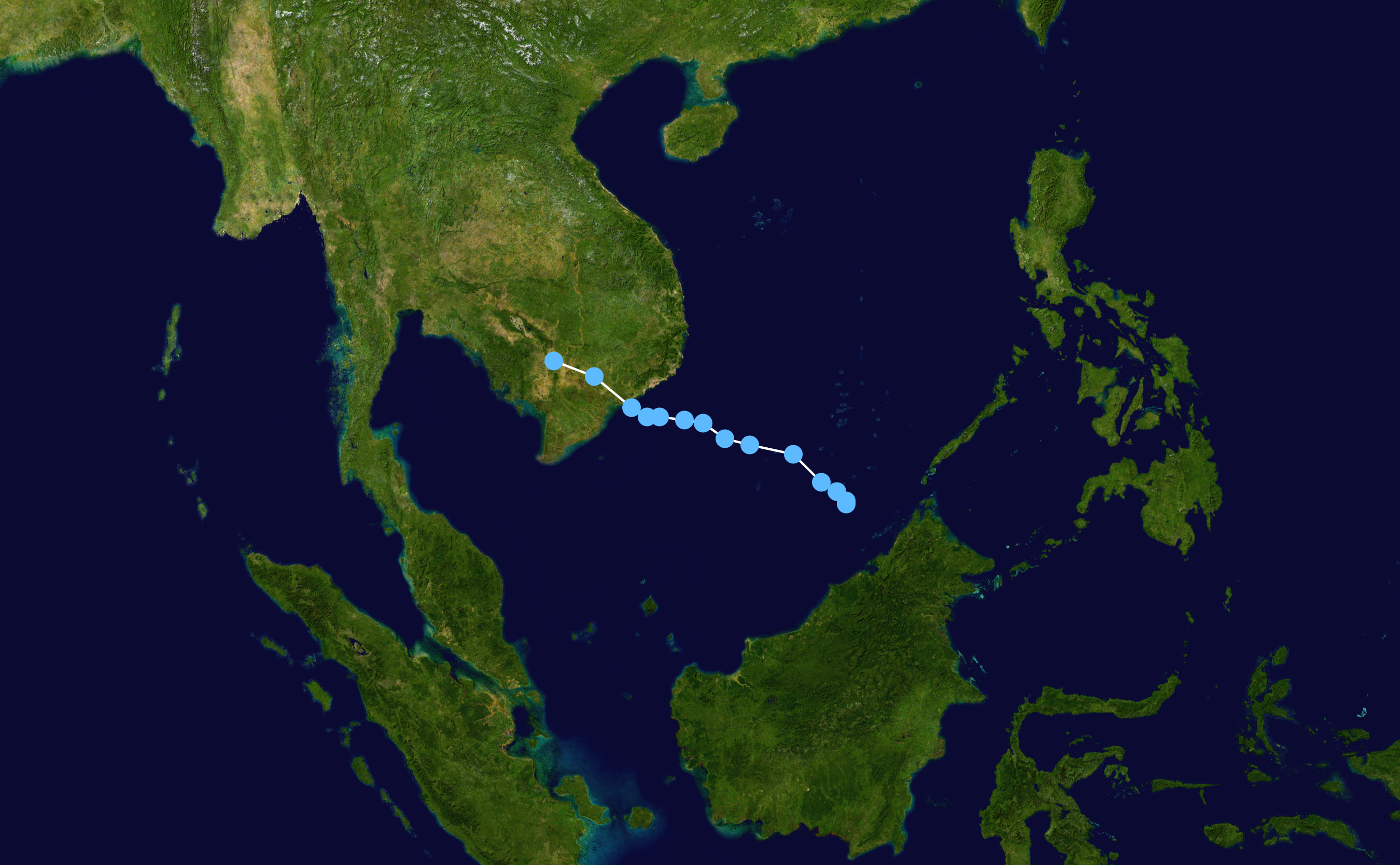
- Duration: November 2 – November 6
- Peak intensity: 55 km/h (35 mph) (10-min); 1004 hPa (mbar)

On November 2, a tropical depression formed west of Sabah, Malaysia. On November 5, it made landfall in southern Vietnam, and moved westwards until it dissipated on November 6.

The depression exacerbated the torrential rains and heavy flooding that had impacted central and southern Vietnam since mid October, damaging more than 20,000 homes. A total of 15 people were killed and total damage reached ₫1.073 trillion (US$48.1 million) in Vietnam from November 1, though a total of 35 have been killed since the flooding from October. Residents say that the country had their worst flooding since 2011.

=== Tropical Storm Ma-on ===
- Tropical storm (JMA)
- Tropical storm (SSHWS)
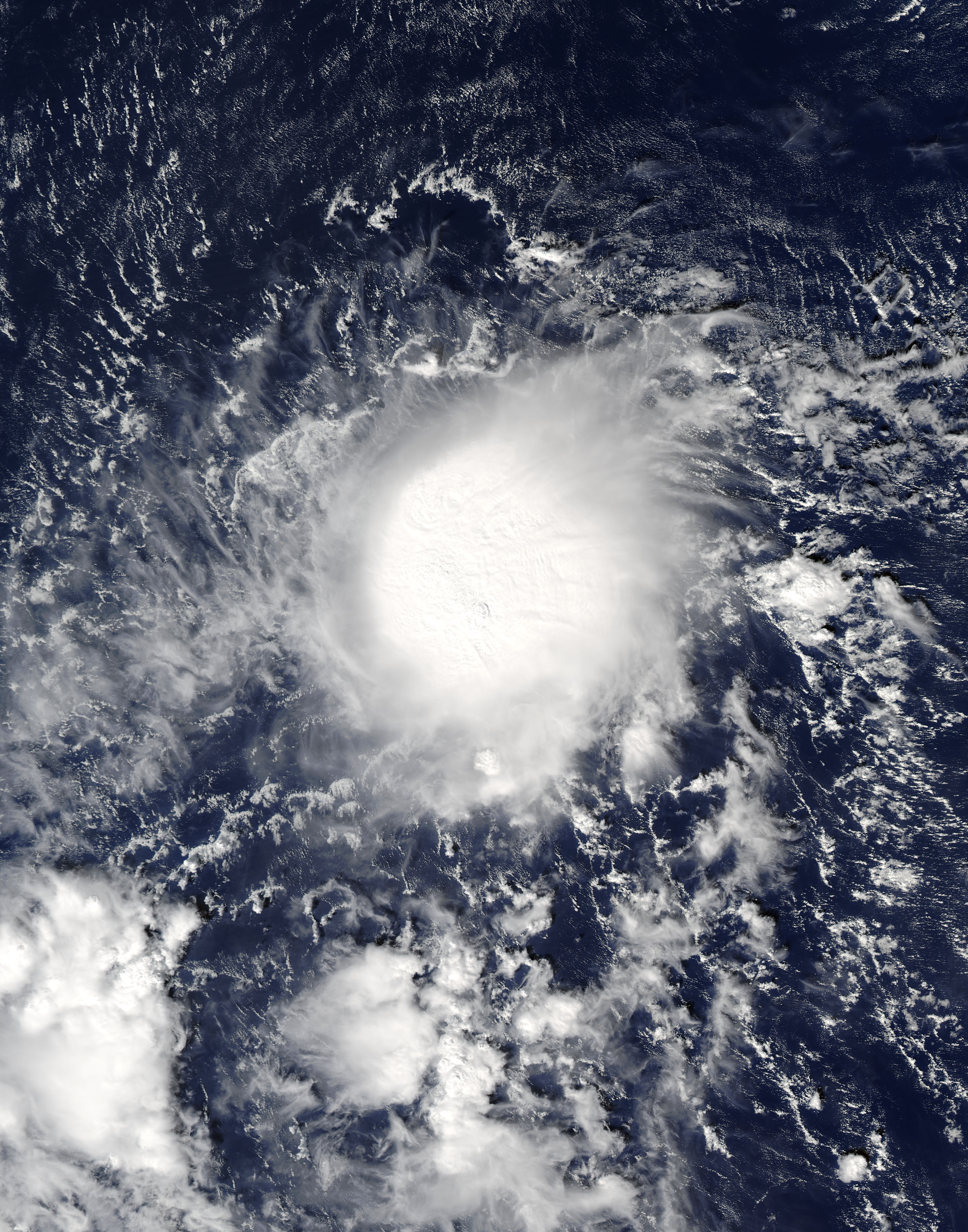
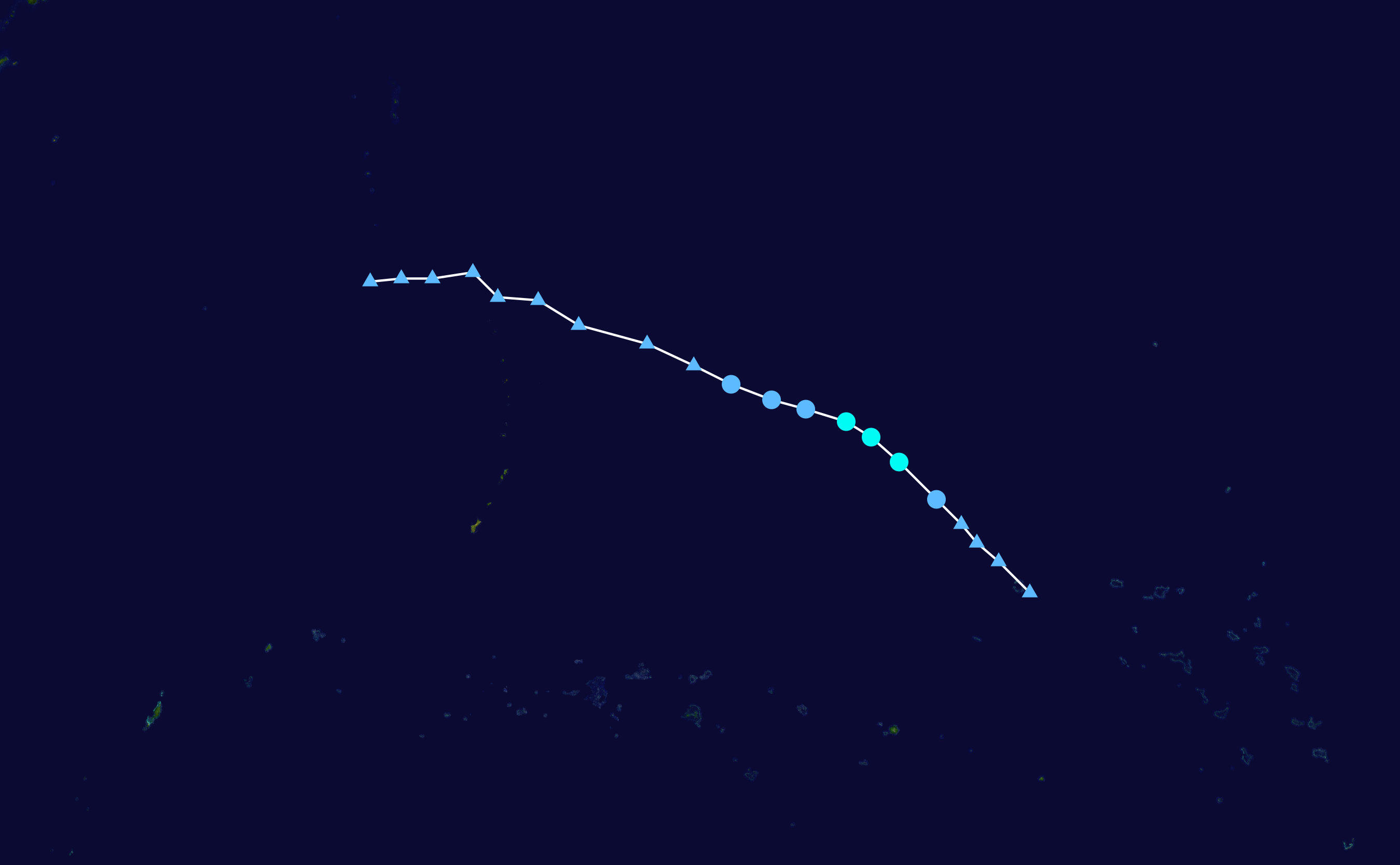
- Duration: November 8 – November 13
- Peak intensity: 65 km/h (40 mph) (10-min); 1002 hPa (mbar)

On November 8, the JMA started to track a tropical depression that had formed several nautical miles to the east of the Mariana Islands. Later that day, the JTWC had started initiating advisories giving it the designation 27W. During the next day, the JMA upgraded 27W to a tropical storm, naming it Ma-on, due to deep curved convection despite the system's LLCC being exposed. The JTWC followed suit, upgrading it to a tropical storm after the system became more symmetrical with deep convection over in an area of low wind shear. Later that day, Ma-on reached its maximum intensity with 10-minute sustained winds of 75 km/h (45 mph) and a minimum pressure of 1002 mbar. Despite additional strengthening being forecast, its LLCC became exposed as favorable conditions started to deteriorate. Both agencies downgraded Ma-on to a tropical depression and issued their final advisories, although, the JMA tracked Ma-on until November 13.

=== Tropical Depression 28W ===
- Tropical depression (JMA)
- Tropical depression (SSHWS)
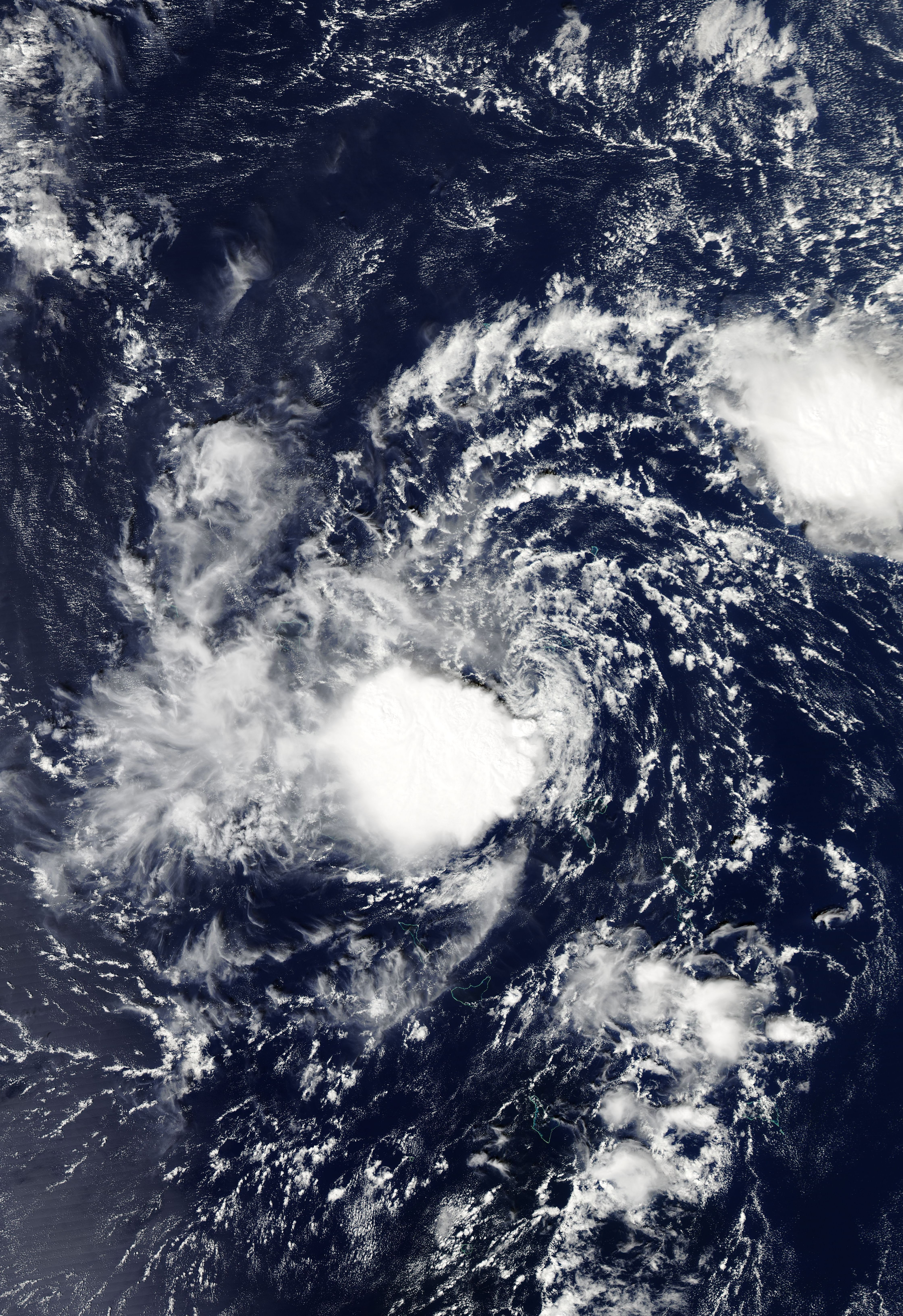
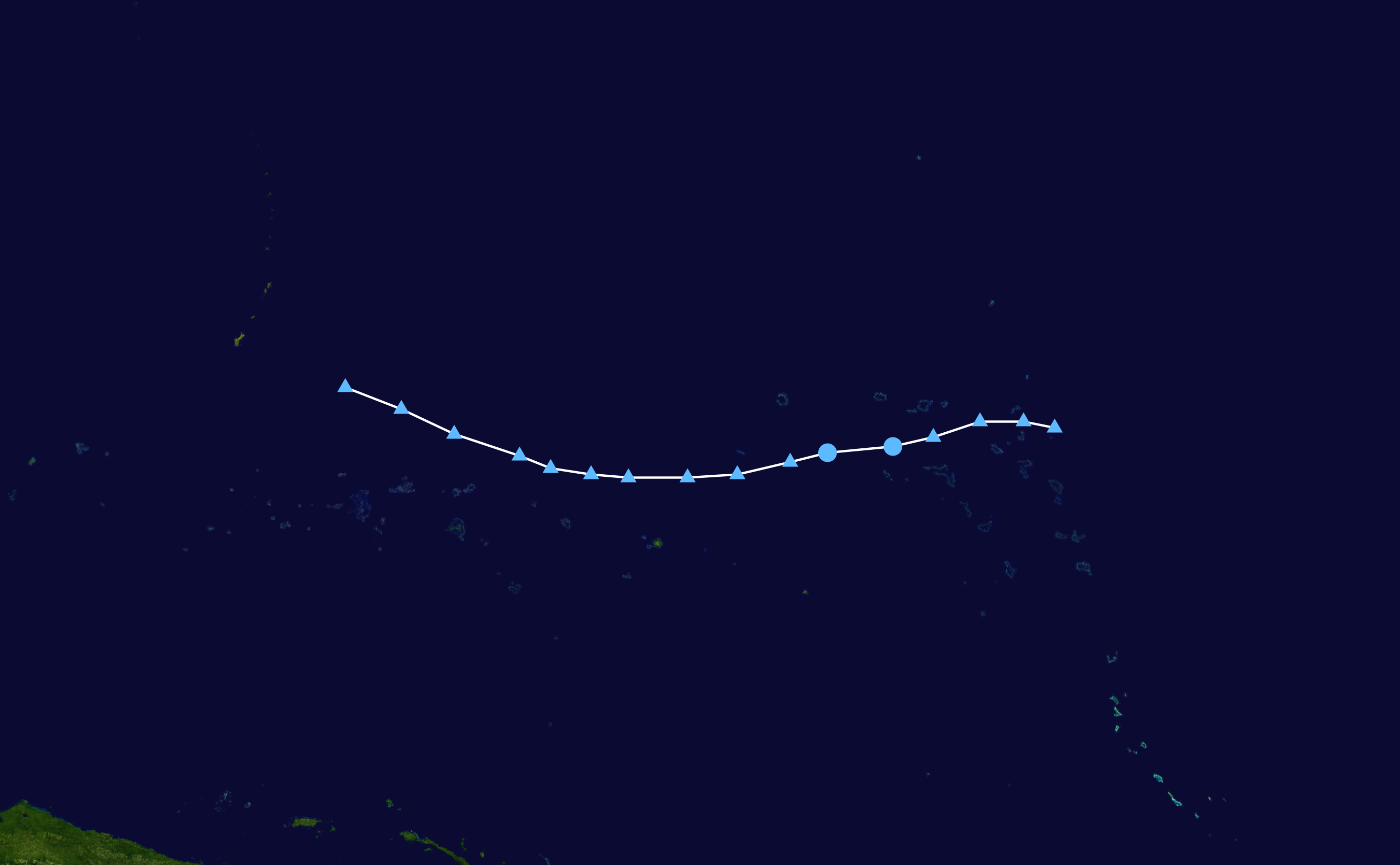
- Duration: November 9 – November 12
- Peak intensity: 45 km/h (30 mph) (1-min); 1008 hPa (mbar)

During November 9, the JMA reported that a tropical depression had developed, about 455 km (285 mi) to the east-northeast of Kwajalein Atoll in the Marshall Islands. Over the next couple of days, the system moved westwards through the Marshall Islands, where it gradually consolidated further within a favourable environment for further development. During November 11, the JTWC initiated advisories and designated the system as Tropical Depression 28W, after atmospheric convection had started to wrap into the weekly defined low level circulation centre. However, as the system was located within an area of low to moderate vertical wind shear, atmospheric convection associated with the system quickly dissipated. The system subsequently degenerated into a tropical wave, before it was last noted by both warning centers during November 12.

=== Severe Tropical Storm Tokage (Marce) ===
- Severe tropical storm (JMA)
- Category 1 typhoon (SSHWS)
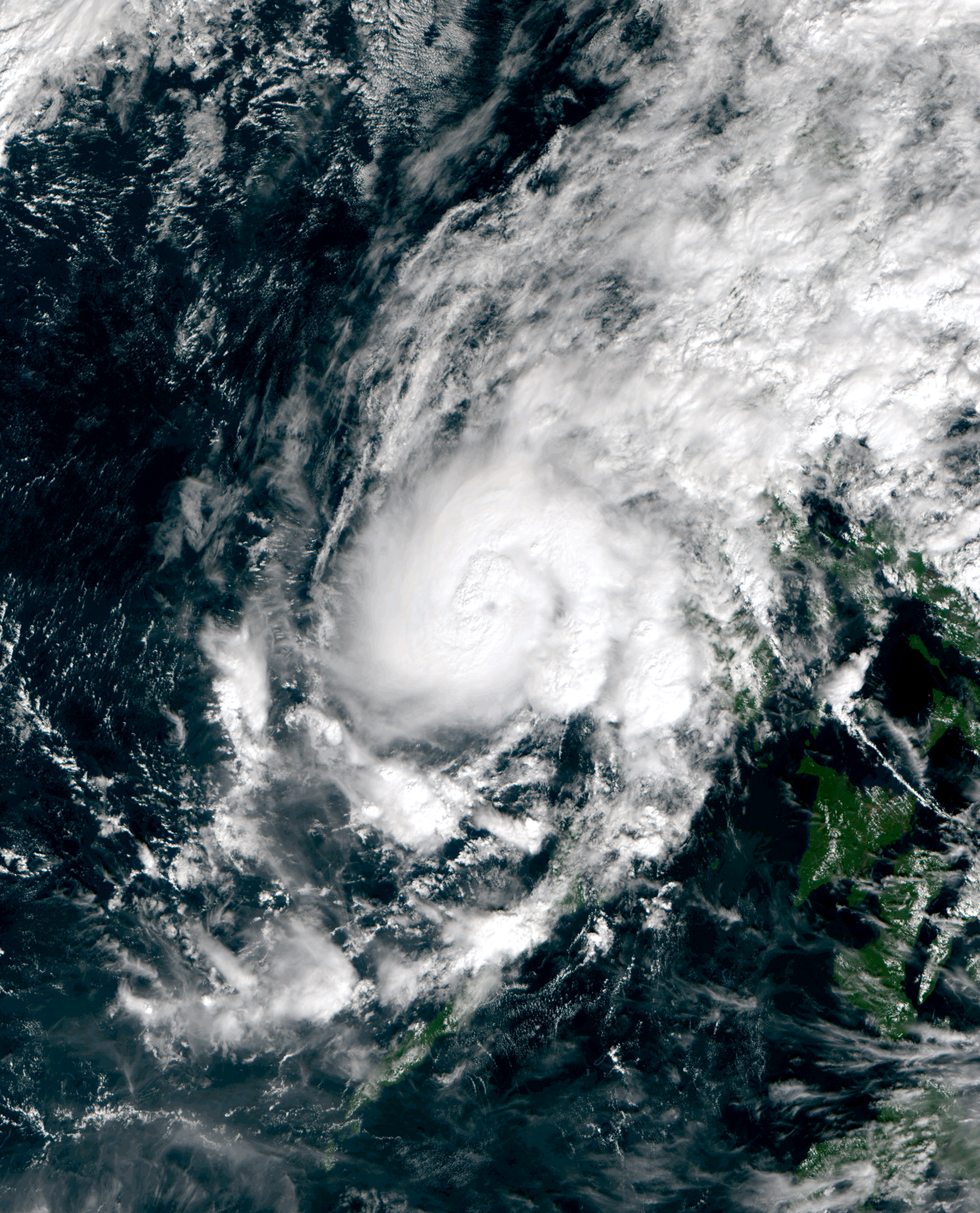
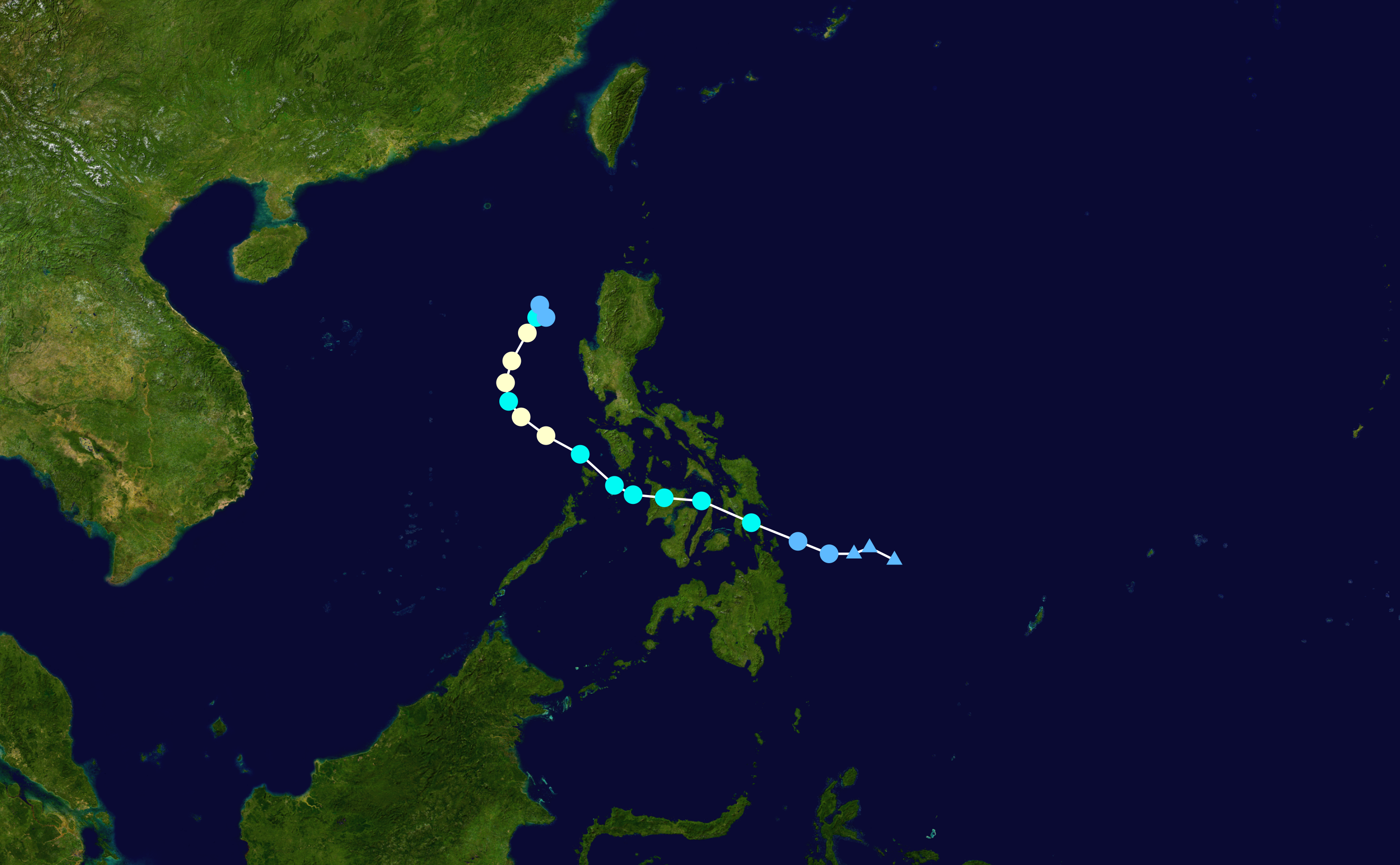
- Duration: November 23 – November 28
- Peak intensity: 95 km/h (60 mph) (10-min); 992 hPa (mbar)

During November 23, PAGASA started to monitor a tropical depression that had developed about 420 km (260 mi) to the east of Hinatuan, Surigao del Sur. The JMA, however, tracked the depression on November 24. The JTWC would shortly follow suit, designating it as "29W". Over the rest of the day, the depression was gradually organizing under favorable conditions, before the PAGASA reported that Tropical Depression "Marce" had made landfall over Siargao Island around 12:00 UTC (8:00 p.m. PST) of the same day. The JTWC would also follow suit shortly. On 12:00 UTC of November 25, the JMA reported that "Marce" became a tropical storm while traversing the Visayan Sea, naming it as "Tokage". Around 21:00 UTC of the same day, the PAGASA reported that "Marce" became a tropical storm while nearing Panay Island. Tokage would emerge into the Mindoro Strait while making its second landfall and traverse on the Calamian Islands. Shortly after emerging into the South China Sea on November 26, JMA reported that Tokage briefly reached its peak intensity of 95 km/h (51 knots) and a pressure of 992 hpa. The JTWC would follow suit, upgrading Tokage to a category 1 typhoon, reaching its peak intensity of 135 km/h (73 knots) and a pressure of 967 hPa, while weakening to a tropical storm at 12:00 UTC the same day. Around 03:00 UTC (11:00 a.m PST) of November 26, PAGASA reported that Tokage slightly intensified while the storm is re-intensifying in the South China Sea. On the next day, the JTWC reported that Tokage has regained its category 1 status, and had made its secondary peak intensity with 145 km/h (78 knots) and a pressure of 963 hPa. Afterwards, Tokage rapidly weakened below typhoon intensity on 12:00 UTC the same day, below tropical storm intensity at 18:00 UTC, and both agencies discontinued advisories on 00:00 UTC of November 28. The PAGASA, however, discontinued advisories for Tropical Depression "Marce" 3 hours later, around 11 a.m. PST.

A total of 2,980 families were affected during Tokage's passing, and only 712 families evacuated to their designated evacuation centers and 67 families were served outside. A total of 46 municipalities and 9 cities on the regions Mimaropa, 6, 7, 8, 10, NIR and CAR suspended their classes during the storm, a total of 32 flights were cancelled, a total of 6 transmission lines were affected in Visayas, 2 landslides were reported on Sogod, Southern Leyte and Baybay, Leyte, 8 flooding incidents were reported around Oriental Mindoro, Romblon, and Negros Occidental. A total of 16 houses were destroyed during the storm (totally or partially), 40 hectares of palay to tillering stage and 15 hectares in ripening stage were damaged on some parts of Iloilo, and a total of ₱1,500,000 (US$28,788) as reported damages to infrastructure. In response, the DSWD provided a total of ₱24,9049.57 ($47,79.58 USD) to the affected families on Surigao del Norte and Surigao del Sur.

=== Typhoon Nock-ten (Nina) ===
- Violent typhoon (JMA)
- Category 5 super typhoon (SSHWS)
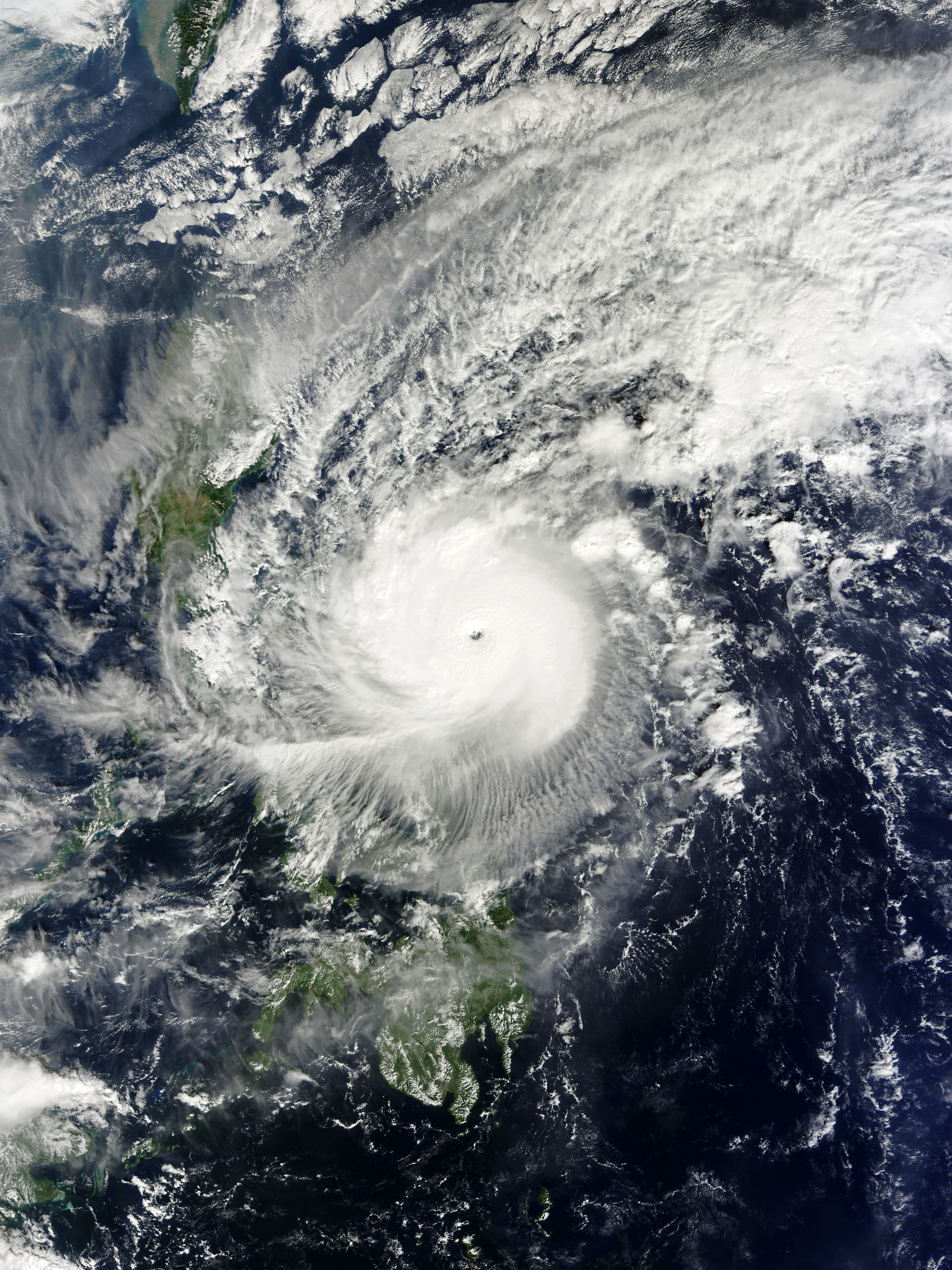
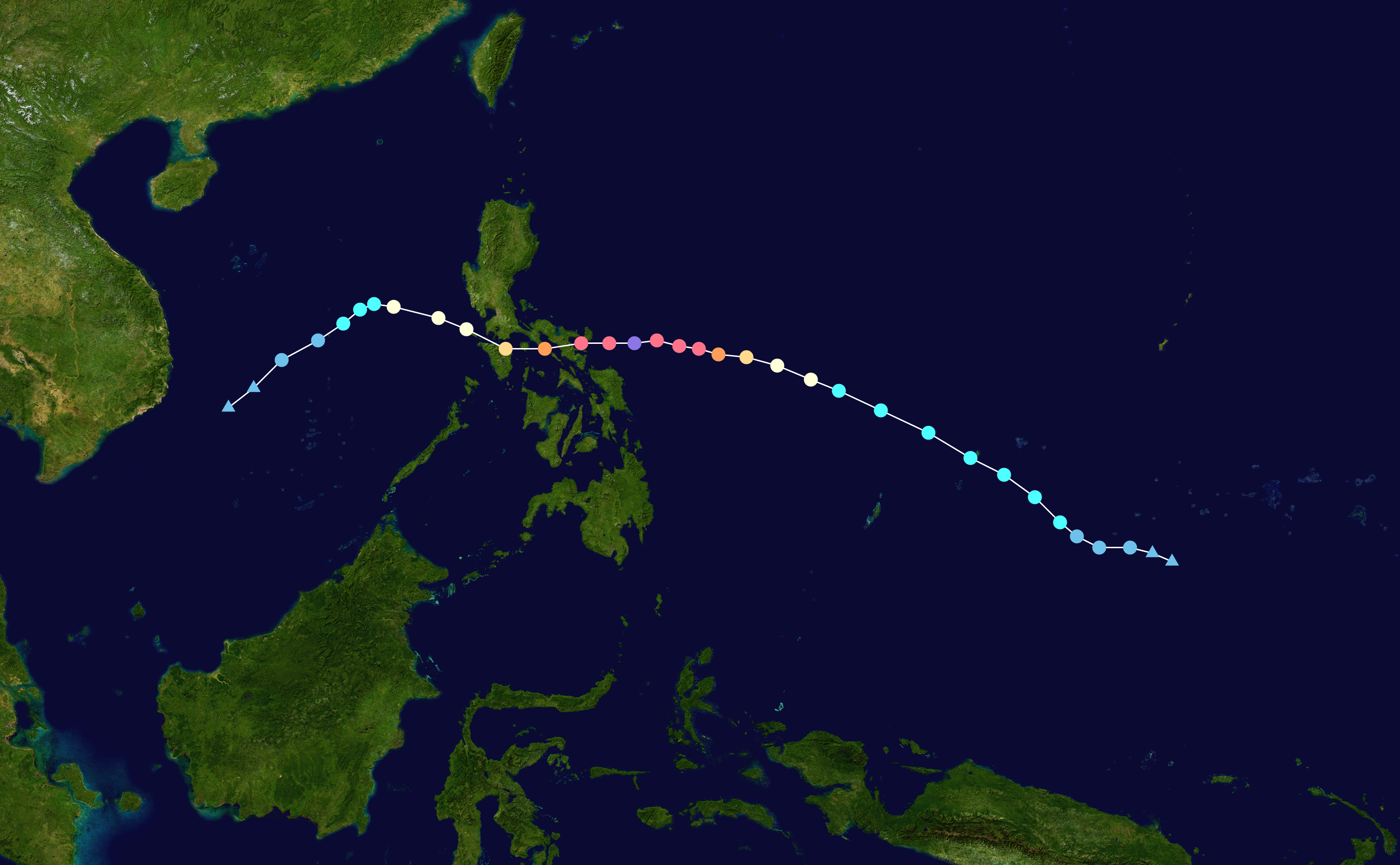
- Duration: December 20 – December 28
- Peak intensity: 195 km/h (120 mph) (10-min); 915 hPa (mbar)

Nock-ten was first noted as a tropical depression on December 21, and quickly organized into a tropical storm. The system reached severe tropical storm intensity the following day, and then typhoon intensity the day after. Around this time, a well-defined eye formed, and the storm began rapidly intensifying. Nock-ten reached its peak intensity as a Category 5-equivalent super typhoon with 1-minute sustained winds of 260 km/h (160 mph) on December 25, becoming the strongest tropical cyclone recorded on Christmas Day anywhere in the world since at least 1960 in terms of 1-minute sustained winds. Shortly thereafter, land interaction imparted weakening, with warming cloud tops, and the typhoon made its first landfall over Catanduanes as a Category 4-equivalent super typhoon with 1-minute sustained winds of 250 km/h (155 mph). Nock-ten emerged into the South China Sea as a minimal typhoon, where strong vertical wind shear associated with a cold surge event led to continued weakening, with the low-level circulation center becoming exposed. The JMA issued its final advisory on the system late on December 27, and the JTWC followed suit early on December 28.

=== Other systems ===
- On June 22, the JMA started to monitor a broad tropical depression that had developed about 190 km (120 mi) to the southwest of Manila in the Philippines. The system was located within a favourable environment for further development, but was not expected to significantly develop any further, as an upper-level low was expected to move over the system. The system moved northwestwards, before it weakened to a remnant low-pressure area on June 24. However, the system's remnants were tracked until they made landfall on central Vietnam on June 27. The system was responsible for some heavy rainfall in Central and Southern Vietnam.
- The JMA upgraded a low-pressure area east of Taiwan to a tropical depression on August 6. The system made landfall over eastern China on August 9.
- On August 10, the JMA reported that a tropical depression had developed, about 300 km (185 mi) to the southeast of Ishigaki Island. Over the next day the system moved north-westwards, within a marginal environment for further development, before it passed over northern Taiwan and moved into the East China Sea. The system subsequently continued moved westwards, before it was last noted as it made landfall on southern China later that day.
- During August 12, a tropical depression developed near the coast of Taiwan, about 160 km (100 mi) to the southeast of Taipei. The system subsequently made landfall on the island, before it was last noted during the next day as it dissipated over Taiwan.
- A tropical depression briefly appeared over the Gulf of Tonkin early on August 16.
- On August 23, a tropical depression developed over the South China Sea. However, the next day, it weakened to a low-pressure area.
- Another tropical depression briefly formed northeast of the Mariana Islands on August 24.
- A tropical depression formed north of Wake Island early on August 30, and it became extratropical on the next day.
- On September 10, the JMA had briefly monitored a tropical depression to the east of Okinawa.
- On October 15, the JMA reported that a tropical depression had entered the basin from the Central Pacific. The system moved in a westward direction until dissipating several hours later on the same day.
- On November 1, the JMA started to track a tropical depression about 704 km (437 mi) east of Andersen Air Force Base, Guam. Later that same day, the JMA started issuing advisories on the depression whilst the JTWC had issued a Tropical Cyclone Formation Alert, though they canceled it early on November 2. The system moved northward until the JMA issued its final advisory as it interacted with the outer rainbands of the nearby Typhoon Meari and became extratropical on November 5.
- During December 10, the JMA started to monitor a tropical depression that had developed about 415 km (260 mi) to the southeast of Ho-Chi-Minh City in Southern Vietnam. Over the next couple of days, the system moved slowly westwards without developing any further, before it made landfall on and dissipated over Southern Vietnam during December 13. The depression had caused torrential rains and heavy flooding since mid December in Central and Southern Vietnam, where at least 24 people were killed and total damages had reached to at least ₫1.21 trillion (US$53.4 million) in Vietnam.
- On December 27, the JMA briefly monitored on a tropical depression located near Chuuk, which dissipated later on the same day.

== Storm names ==
Within the Northwest Pacific Ocean, both the Japan Meteorological Agency (JMA) and the Philippine Atmospheric, Geophysical and Astronomical Services Administration (PAGASA) assign names to tropical cyclones that develop in the Western Pacific, which can result in a tropical cyclone having two names. The Japan Meteorological Agency's RSMC Tokyo — Typhoon Center assigns international names to tropical cyclones on behalf of the World Meteorological Organization's Typhoon Committee, should they be judged to have 10-minute sustained windspeeds of 65 km/h (40 mph). PAGASA names to tropical cyclones which move into or form as a tropical depression in their area of responsibility located between 135°E and 115°E and between 5°N and 25°N even if the cyclone has had an international name assigned to it. The names of significant tropical cyclones are retired, by both PAGASA and the Typhoon Committee. Should the list of names for the Philippine region be exhausted then names will be taken from an auxiliary list of which the first ten are published each season. Unused names are marked in gray.

=== International names ===
During the season 26 tropical storms developed in the Western Pacific and each one was named by the JMA, when the system was judged to have 10-minute sustained windspeeds of 65 km/h (40 mph). The JMA selected the names from a list of 140 names, that had been developed by the 14 members nations and territories of the ESCAP/WMO Typhoon Committee. During the season, the name Rai was used for the first time after it replaced the name Fanapi in the 2010 season.

Nepartak	Lupit	Mirinae	Nida	Omais	Conson	Chanthu	Dianmu	Mindulle	Lionrock	Kompasu	Namtheun	Malou
Meranti	Rai	Malakas	Megi	Chaba	Aere	Songda	Sarika	Haima	Meari	Ma-on	Tokage	Nock-ten

==== Retirement ====
After the season, at their 49th Session in 2017 the ESCAP/WMO Typhoon Committee announced that the names Meranti, Sarika, Haima and Nock-ten were removed from the naming lists due to the number of deaths and amount of damages each one caused, and they will not be used again for another typhoon name. In February 2018, the names were subsequently replaced by Nyatoh, Trases, Mulan, and Hinnamnor for future seasons, respectively.

=== Philippines ===
Ambo	Butchoy	Carina	Dindo	Enteng
Ferdie	Gener	Helen	Igme	Julian
Karen	Lawin	Marce	Nina	Ofel (unused)
Pepito (unused)	Quinta (unused)	Rolly (unused)	Siony (unused)	Tonyo (unused)
Ulysses (unused)	Vicky (unused)	Warren (unused)	Yoyong (unused)	Zosimo (unused)
Auxiliary list
Alakdan (unused)	Baldo (unused)	Clara (unused)	Dencio (unused)	Estong (unused)
Felipe (unused)	Gomer (unused)	Heling (unused)	Ismael (unused)	Julio (unused)

During the season PAGASA used its own naming scheme for the 14 tropical cyclones, that either developed within or moved into their self-defined area of responsibility. The names were taken from a list of names, that was last used during 2012 and were used again during 2020. All of the names are the same except for Pepito, which replaced the name Pablo after it was retired. The name Gardo was replaced by Gomer after Gardo was added to PAGASA's main list replacing Glenda, which was retired after the 2014 season.

==== Retirement ====
After the season, the names Karen, Lawin and Nina were retired by PAGASA, as they had caused over ₱1 billion in damages. They were subsequently replaced on the list with the names Kristine, Leon and Nika for the 2020 season.

== Season effects ==
This table will list all the storms that developed in the northwestern Pacific Ocean west of the International Date Line and north of the equator during 2016. It will include their intensity, duration, name, areas affected, deaths, and damage totals. Classification and intensity values will be based on estimations conducted by the JMA. All damage figures will be in 2016 USD. Damages and deaths from a storm will include when the storm was a precursor wave or an extratropical cyclone.

Name	Dates	Peak intensity			Areas affected	Damage (USD)	Deaths	Ref(s).
Name	Dates	Category	Wind speed	Pressure	Areas affected	Damage (USD)	Deaths	Ref(s).
01W	May 25–27	Tropical depression	Not specified	1,000 hPa (29.53 inHg)	South China	$9.14 million	None	
TD	June 22–23	Tropical depression	55 km/h (35 mph)	1,006 hPa (29.71 inHg)	Vietnam	None	None	
Ambo	June 25–28	Tropical depression	55 km/h (35 mph)	1,004 hPa (29.65 inHg)	Philippines, South China	None	None	
Nepartak (Butchoy)	July 2–10	Violent typhoon	205 km/h (125 mph)	900 hPa (26.58 inHg)	Caroline Islands, Mariana Islands, Philippines, Ryukyu Islands, Taiwan, East China	$1.89 billion	111	
03W	July 15–20	Tropical depression	Not specified	1,006 hPa (29.71 inHg)	Ryukyu Islands	None	None	
Lupit	July 22–24	Tropical storm	75 km/h (45 mph)	1,000 hPa (29.53 inHg)	None	None	None	
Mirinae	July 25–28	Severe tropical storm	100 km/h (60 mph)	980 hPa (28.94 inHg)	South China, Vietnam, Laos, Thailand	$381 million	7	
Nida (Carina)	July 29 – August 3	Severe tropical storm	110 km/h (70 mph)	975 hPa (28.79 inHg)	Philippines, Taiwan, China, Hong Kong, Vietnam	$316 million	6	
Omais	August 2–9	Severe tropical storm	110 km/h (70 mph)	975 hPa (28.79 inHg)	Mariana Islands, Japan, Russia	None	None	
TD	August 6–9	Tropical depression	Not specified	998 hPa (29.47 inHg)	Ryukyu Islands, East China	None	None	
Conson	August 7–14	Tropical storm	85 km/h (55 mph)	985 hPa (29.09 inHg)	Japan, Russia	None	None	
TD	August 10–13	Tropical depression	Not specified	996 hPa (29.41 inHg)	Ryukyu Islands, Taiwan, East China	None	None	
TD	August 10–12	Tropical depression	Not specified	1,010 hPa (29.83 inHg)	Midway Atoll	None	None	
Chanthu	August 12–17	Severe tropical storm	100 km/h (60 mph)	980 hPa (28.94 inHg)	Japan, Russian Far East	$94.7 million	None	
TD	August 12–13	Tropical depression	Not specified	1,002 hPa (29.59 inHg)	Taiwan	None	None	
Dianmu	August 15–19	Tropical storm	75 km/h (45 mph)	980 hPa (28.94 inHg)	China, Vietnam, Laos, Thailand, Myanmar, Bangladesh, India	$570 million	23	
TD	August 15–16	Tropical depression	Not specified	996 hPa (29.41 inHg)	South China, Vietnam	None	None	
Mindulle	August 17–23	Strong typhoon	120 km/h (75 mph)	975 hPa (28.79 inHg)	Mariana Islands, Japan	$448 million	3	
Lionrock (Dindo)	August 17–30	Very strong typhoon	165 km/h (105 mph)	940 hPa (27.76 inHg)	Japan, Russia, Northeast China, North Korea	$3.94 billion	550	
Kompasu	August 18–21	Tropical storm	65 km/h (40 mph)	994 hPa (29.35 inHg)	Japan, Russian Far East	None	1	
TD	August 23–24	Tropical depression	Not specified	1,000 hPa (29.53 inHg)	Philippines	None	None	
14W	August 24	Tropical depression	55 km/h (35 mph)	1,002 hPa (29.59 inHg)	Mariana Islands	None	None	
TD	August 24	Tropical depression	Not specified	1,000 hPa (29.53 inHg)	None	None	None	
TD	August 27	Tropical depression	Not specified	1,004 hPa (29.65 inHg)	None	None	None	
TD	August 30–31	Tropical depression	Not specified	1,004 hPa (29.65 inHg)	None	None	None	
Namtheun (Enteng)	August 31 – September 5	Strong typhoon	130 km/h (80 mph)	955 hPa (28.20 inHg)	Taiwan, South Korea, Japan	None	None	
Malou	September 5–7	Tropical storm	75 km/h (45 mph)	1,000 hPa (29.53 inHg)	Japan	None	None	
TD	September 7–8	Tropical depression	Not specified	998 hPa (29.47 inHg)	Japan	None	None	
Meranti (Ferdie)	September 8–16	Violent typhoon	220 km/h (135 mph)	890 hPa (26.28 inHg)	Philippines, Taiwan, Mainland China, South Korea	$4.79 billion	47	
TD	September 9–10	Tropical depression	Not specified	1,008 hPa (29.77 inHg)	None	None	None	
TD	September 10	Tropical depression	Not specified	1,008 hPa (29.77 inHg)	Taiwan	None	None	
17W	September 10–12	Tropical depression	55 km/h (35 mph)	1,000 hPa (29.53 inHg)	None	None	None	
Rai	September 11–13	Tropical storm	65 km/h (40 mph)	996 hPa (29.41 inHg)	Vietnam, Laos, Thailand, Cambodia	$74 million	14	
Malakas (Gener)	September 11–20	Very strong typhoon	175 km/h (110 mph)	930 hPa (27.46 inHg)	Mariana Islands, Taiwan, Japan	$300 million	1	
Megi (Helen)	September 22–29	Very strong typhoon	155 km/h (95 mph)	945 hPa (27.91 inHg)	Caroline Islands, Ryukyu Islands, Taiwan, South China, East China	$1.57 billion	52	
Chaba (Igme)	September 24 – October 5	Violent typhoon	215 km/h (135 mph)	905 hPa (26.72 inHg)	Mariana Islands, South Korea, Japan, Russian Far East	$129 million	10	
Songda	October 4–13	Very strong typhoon	185 km/h (115 mph)	925 hPa (27.32 inHg)	Pacific Northwest	None	None	
Aere (Julian)	October 4–14	Severe tropical storm	110 km/h (70 mph)	975 hPa (28.79 inHg)	Philippines, Taiwan, South China, Vietnam, Laos, Thailand, Cambodia	$209 million	37	
Sarika (Karen)	October 13–19	Very strong typhoon	175 km/h (110 mph)	935 hPa (27.61 inHg)	Philippines, South China, Vietnam	$894 million	1	
Haima (Lawin)	October 14–21	Violent typhoon	215 km/h (135 mph)	900 hPa (26.58 inHg)	Caroline Islands, Philippines, Taiwan, China, South China, Hong Kong, East China, Japan	$972 million	19	
TD	October 15	Tropical depression	Not specified	1,008 hPa (29.77 inHg)	None	None	None	
Meari	October 30 – November 7	Strong typhoon	140 km/h (85 mph)	960 hPa (28.35 inHg)	Mariana Islands	None	None	
TD	October 31	Tropical depression	Not specified	1,008 hPa (29.77 inHg)	Mariana Islands	None	None	
TD	November 1–5	Tropical depression	55 km/h (35 mph)	998 hPa (29.47 inHg)	None	None	None	
TD	November 2–6	Tropical depression	55 km/h (35 mph)	1,004 hPa (29.65 inHg)	Borneo, Vietnam, Cambodia	$112 million	15	
Ma-on	November 8–13	Tropical storm	65 km/h (40 mph)	1,002 hPa (29.59 inHg)	None	None	None	
28W	November 9–12	Tropical depression	Not specified	1,008 hPa (29.77 inHg)	Marshall Islands	None	None	
Tokage (Marce)	November 24–28	Severe tropical storm	95 km/h (60 mph)	992 hPa (29.29 inHg)	Philippines, Vietnam	$30,000	1	
TD	December 10–13	Tropical depression	55 km/h (35 mph)	1,004 hPa (29.65 inHg)	Vietnam	$146 million	31	
Nock-ten (Nina)	December 20–28	Violent typhoon	195 km/h (120 mph)	915 hPa (27.02 inHg)	Caroline Islands, Philippines, Vietnam	$123 million	13	
TD	December 27	Tropical depression	Not specified	1,004 hPa (29.65 inHg)	None	None	None	
Season aggregates
51 systems	May 25 – December 28		220 km/h (135 mph)	890 hPa (26.28 inHg)		$17 billion	942	

== See also ==
- Weather of 2016
- Tropical cyclones in 2016
- Pacific typhoon season
- 2016 Atlantic hurricane season
- 2016 Pacific hurricane season
- 2016 North Indian Ocean cyclone season
- South-West Indian Ocean cyclone seasons: 2015–16, 2016–17
- Australian region cyclone seasons: 2015–16, 2016–17
- South Pacific cyclone seasons: 2015–16, 2016–17
