= Typhoon Bilis (2000) =

Pacific typhoon in 2000

Typhoon Bilis (Isang)
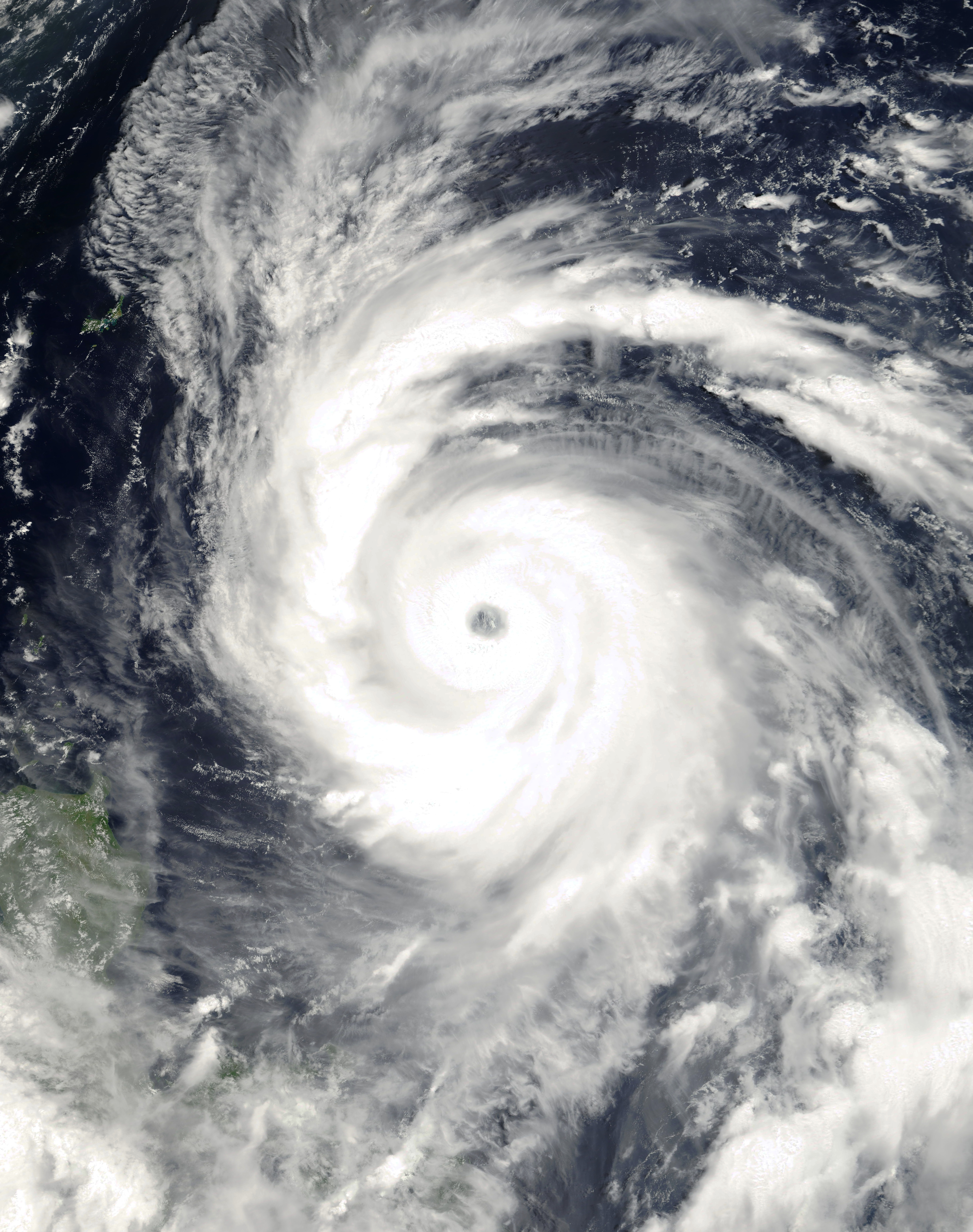
- Bilis near peak intensity on August 21

Meteorological history
- Formed: August 18, 2000
- Extratropical: August 25, 2000
- Dissipated: August 27, 2000

Violent typhoon
- 10-minute sustained (JMA)
- Highest winds: 205 km/h (125 mph)
- Lowest pressure: 920 hPa (mbar); 27.17 inHg

Category 5-equivalent super typhoon
- 1-minute sustained (SSHWS/JTWC)
- Highest winds: 260 km/h (160 mph)
- Lowest pressure: 898 hPa (mbar); 26.52 inHg

Overall effects
- Fatalities: 71 total
- Damage: $668 million (2000 USD)
- Areas affected: Taiwan; China; South Korea; Ryukyu Islands; Guam
- IBTrACS
- Part of the 2000 Pacific typhoon season

Typhoon Bilis (Note: The name Bilis (Tagalog: bilis, [bɪ.ˈlɪs]) was contributed by the Philippines and means speed in Tagalog.), known in the Philippines as Typhoon Isang, was the strongest tropical cyclone in the western Pacific during 2000 and brought considerable damage in Taiwan and China in August of that year. It was the strongest typhoon on record to hit Taiwan. The tenth named storm of the season, Bilis originated from an area of disturbed weather that developed into a tropical depression southeast of Guam on August 18. Situated within an environment highly conductive for continued tropical development, the depression strengthened into a tropical storm a day after formation; Bilis was upgraded to typhoon status on August 20 as it maintained a northwest course. Without significant inhibiting factors, the typhoon reached its peak intensity with maximum sustained winds of 205 km/h (127 mph) and a minimum barometric pressure of 920 mbar (hPa; 27.17 inHg). At the same intensity, Bilis made landfall on Taiwan the following day. Despite its short stint over land, Bilis was greatly weakened, and made a brief track over the Taiwan Strait before its final landfall on China's Fujian Province early the next day. Moving inland into Mainland China, Bilis quickly weakened, and was only a tropical depression later that day; the depression diffused into a remnant low on August 25. These remnants tracked northeast across the Yellow Sea before dissipating in the Korean Peninsula on August 27.

The typhoon left 71 fatalities along its path, with the greatest impacts in Taiwan and mainland China. In the Philippines, Bilis was also given the local name Isang.

== Meteorological history ==
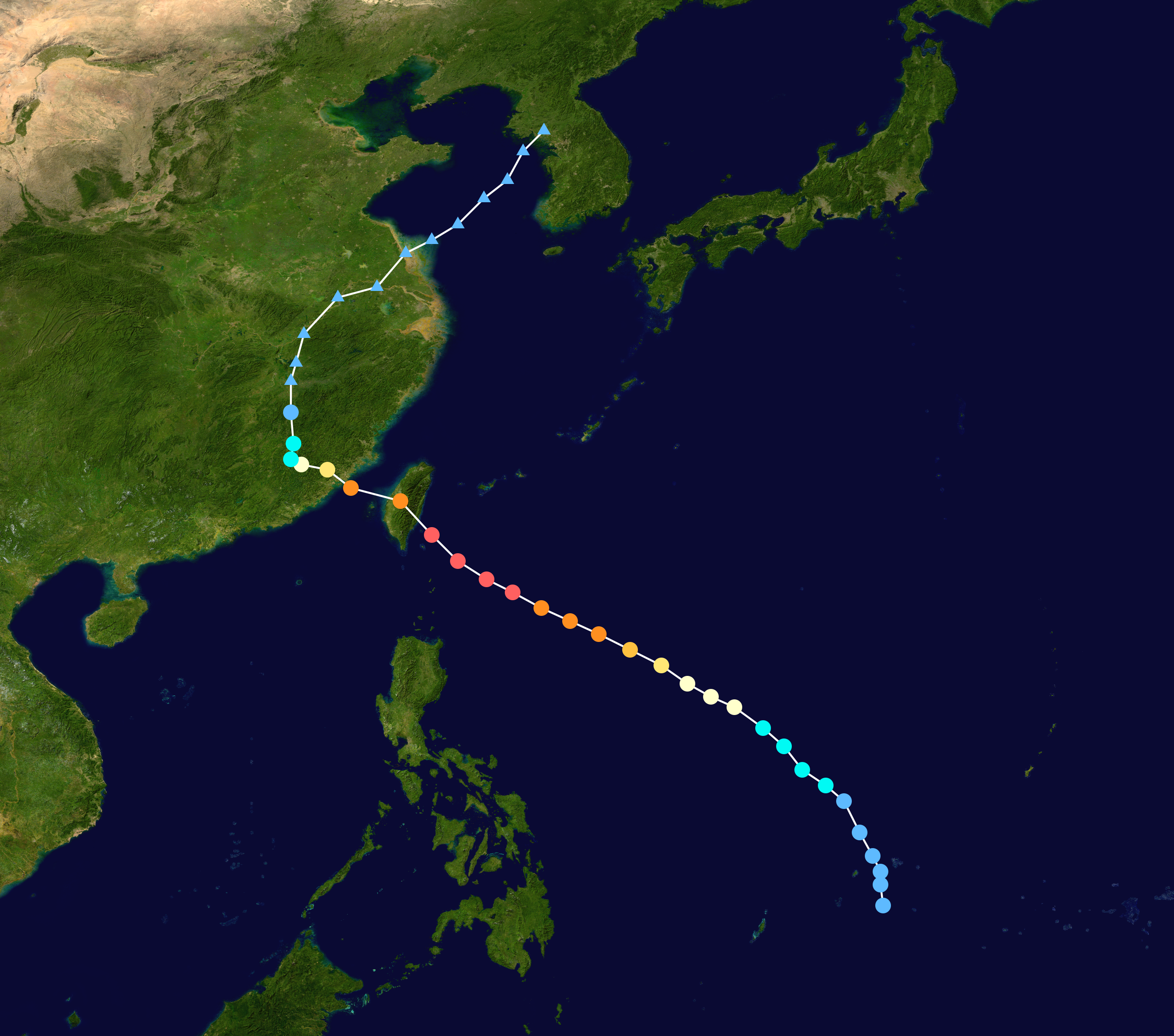
Map plotting the storm's track and intensity, according to the Saffir–Simpson scale Map key Saffir–Simpson scale Tropical depression (≤38 mph, ≤62 km/h) Tropical storm (39–73 mph, 63–118 km/h) Category 1 (74–95 mph, 119–153 km/h) Category 2 (96–110 mph, 154–177 km/h) Category 3 (111–129 mph, 178–208 km/h) Category 4 (130–156 mph, 209–251 km/h) Category 5 (≥157 mph, ≥252 km/h) Unknown Storm type Tropical cyclone Subtropical cyclone Extratropical cyclone, remnant low, tropical disturbance, or monsoon depression

The predecessor to Typhoon Bilis began as a developing area of disturbed weather well south-southeast of Guam on August 15. Satellite analysis revealed a broad low-pressure area associated with the developing convection. Within an area supportive of tropical cyclogenesis, the disturbance gradually organized and intensified. At 0600 UTC on August 17, the Joint Typhoon Warning Center (JTWC) began classifying the system as a tropical depression. The Japan Meteorological Agency (JMA) followed suit the following day at 1200 UTC. Tracking northwestward, the favorable conditions allowed the depression to quickly strengthen and attain tightly wrapped rainbands, prompting the JMA to upgrade the system to tropical storm status at 0600 UTC on August 19, thus designating the storm with the name Bilis.

This period of rapid strengthening continued throughout the day's course, with the system reaching severe tropical storm intensity twelve hours after naming and then typhoon intensity at 1200 UTC on August 20. Water vapor satellite imagery at the time indicated that Bilis maintained a well-organized outflow pattern. As a result of its rapid intensification, Bilis grew in size, exhibiting a behavior typical of tropical cyclones originating from the northwest Pacific monsoon trough. In addition, the typhoon developed an eye early on August 20, though in its initial stages the eye was irregular in shape. At 1200 UTC on August 21, the JTWC determined Bilis to have reached super typhoon intensity. (Note: A super typhoon is an informal classification used by the JTWC to denote Pacific typhoons with 1-minute sustained winds greater than 150 mph (240 km/h).). Six hours later, the JMA indicated that the typhoon had reached its peak intensity with maximum sustained winds of 205 km/h (127 mph) and a minimum barometric pressure of 920 mbar (hPa; 27.17 inHg). By this point Bilis' eye had become cloud-free and well defined. The typhoon maintained this intensity with little fluctuation for roughly the ensuing eighteen hours as it tracked northwest. Early on August 22, microwave imagery indicated concentric eyewalls, a sign of a possible eyewall replacement cycle.

Still at peak intensity, Bilis made landfall on the coast of southern Taiwan at 1400 UTC on August 22. Concurrently, the storm's internal structure began to show signs of disruption, and its eye began to shrink. The typhoon accelerated over the island, and as such emerged into the Taiwan Strait no longer than five or six hours after landfall. Around the time of its Taiwan landfall, Bilis also entered the area of warning responsibility for PAGASA, which gave the storm the Filipino local name Isang. Despite the short stint over land, Bilis had greatly weakened, and was only a minimal typhoon upon its reentry over water. However, there was a large discrepancy between JMA and JTWC intensity estimates, with the latter suggesting that Bilis had only weakened slightly. Nonetheless, the typhoon made its final landfall Jinjiang, Fujian at 0300 UTC on August 24. This greatly weakened Bilis, and three hours later the JMA downgraded it as a tropical storm. Shortly after landfall, the weakening tropical cyclone became quasi-stationary just inland of Mainland China. By this point convection was intermittent and short-lived, and at 1200 UTC the JMA classified the system as a tropical depression. Though the JTWC discontinued its monitoring activities, the depression began to assume a northerly course on August 24. At 1200 UTC the next day, the depression was determined to have diffused into a remnant low while still inland. Bilis' remnants continued to track northeast, across the Yellow Sea, and dissipated on August 27 shortly after entering the Korean Peninsula.

== Preparations and impact ==
Deaths and damage by region
Region	Total deaths	Damage (USD)	Source
China	57	$534 million	
Taiwan	14	$134 million	
Totals:	71	$668 million	

=== Taiwan ===
In preparation for Bilis, offices were closed across the island. In addition to the closure of businesses, flights to and from the island were rescheduled, and a typhoon relief center was established. Due to the threat of landslides, a landslide warning was issued for Taiwan. Though the storm had not yet made landfall, one person was killed in Taipei on August 22 after they were buried by a landslide triggered by the impending typhoon; this accounted for the first fatality caused by Bilis. Along with flight rescheduling, numerous airports were closed, and the Taiwan Stock Exchange was set to close on August 23. Meanwhile, hospitals extended service times in anticipation for patient admittance. Taiwanese coast guard members regulated fishing activity due to the threat of deadly wave action. The Port of Kaohsiung was closed throughout the duration of the storm. Due to the heightened demand for vegetables in the lead-up to the storm, the cost of such foods increased by 20 to 30 percent.

Bilis was a highly destructive tropical cyclone for Taiwan. Damage to the island's agricultural, fishing, and forestry industries amounted to US$133.5 million. The typhoon caused 14 fatalities and injured an additional 80 people. Power outages adversely impacted approximately 600,000 households, and 400 homes across Taiwan were destroyed. Several hundred thousand families experienced water shortage following the storm. In Cheng-Kung, a weather station recorded a 281 km/h (175 mph) wind gust, which broke the station's anemometer. A single landslide in the town of Jenai buried nine farmers. Tens of thousands of people were displaced during the storm, and moved into evacuation shelters set up by the government. Eight people shooting a film on the outskirts of Kaohsiung became stranded and thus improvised a shelter to ride out the storm. In eastern Hualien County, 250 houses succumbed to strong winds. The winds also felled trees and blew light vehicles around, blocking roads. Heavy rainfall associated with Bilis flooded roughly 40,000 ha (100,000 ac) of orchards and rice paddies. Following Bilis' passage of Taiwan, a magnitude 5.7 earthquake struck the island, exacerbating the already worsened conditions.

=== Mainland China ===
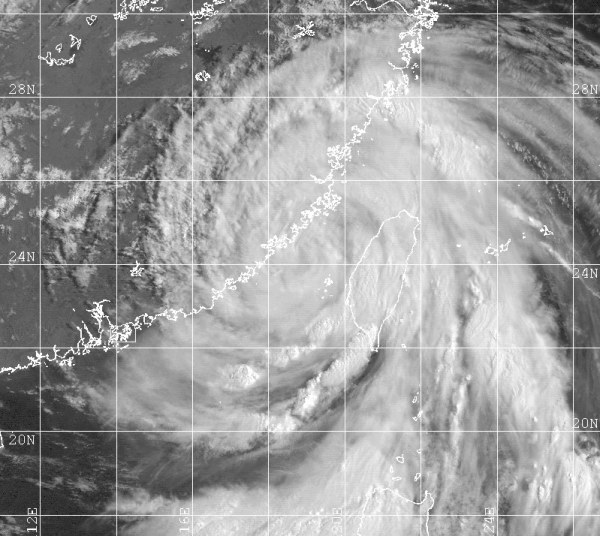
Typhoon Bilis upon making landfall in East China late on August 22

Preparations for Typhoon Bilis in mainland China began on August 22, when the Xiamen Meteorological Observatory issued a warning for Fujian Province. The typhoon was anticipated to be the worst storm to affect Xiamen so far in 2000. As was the case in Taiwan, all three airports in the province were closed, and ferry service was suspended in preparation for the storm. Likewise, Xiamen Airlines cancelled all scheduled flights.

Despite becoming a weaker storm upon its landfall in China as opposed to its landfall on Taiwan, Bilis caused more fatalities and accrued a greater damage cost in China. Economic losses in China totaled US$534 million, with most of the losses occurring in Fujian Province. A total of 57 people were killed, though an additional 1,077 people were either wounded or went missing. Due to felled trees, a railway line from Fuzhou to Mawei blocked rail service. Bilis spawned several tornadoes in the area of Yueqing, ravaging four villages and destroying 20 buildings.

=== Elsewhere ===
As a developing disturbance, the precursor to Bilis dropped heavy rain on Guam on August 18. Peaking at 52 mm (2.0 in), the rain was the result of the storm's surface wind flow. After becoming a tropical cyclone, Bilis' outer rainbands dropped heavy rainfall on Okinawa Prefecture in the Ryukyu Islands. Total rainfall amounts peaked at 136 mm (5.4 in) in Iriomote-jima. Two other stations recorded rainfall totals in excess of 100 mm (3.9 in). The typhoon also produced some gusty winds across the islands, with sustained winds peaking at 65 km/h (40 mph) on Yonaguni. While a weakening remnant system, Bilis caused torrential precipitation across South Korea. At Kunsan Air Base, 468 mm (18.4 in) of rain was recorded over a 48-hour period; this two-day total was over three times the August average for the location.

== See also ==
- Typhoon Nepartak (2016)
- Typhoon Jangmi (2008)
- Typhoon Andy (1982)
- Typhoon Sepat
