= Chin Wei serial rape case =

- Location: Taipei, Taiwan
- Date: July 2016 –
- Attack type: Sexual assault
- Victim: More than ten women
- Perpetrator: Chin Wei

The Chin Wei serial rape case was a sexual assault case in Taiwan that was first exposed in July 2016. The principal suspect was entertainer Chin Wei. In 2016, more than ten women accused him of committing a series of rapes. The Taipei District Prosecutors Office initiated an investigation on its own after reviewing media reports and assigned prosecutors to handle the case.

On 4 November 2016, the Taipei District Prosecutors Office concluded that Chin had sexually or indecently assaulted eight women between 2002 and 2013, including two minors, one of whom was only 14 years old. Prosecutors determined that Chin Wei had committed seven counts of rape and three counts of attempted rape, recommending a total sentence of 41 years and urging the judge to impose a severe punishment. Chin suspended his entertainment career while facing multiple criminal cases..

On 8 August 2018, after being accused of sexually assaulting eight women, Chin was convicted by the Taiwan Taipei District Court in connection with three victims and sentenced to four years' imprisonment for each offense, with a combined sentence of eight years. On 30 April 2019, the Taiwan High Court rejected appeals by both prosecutors and Chin, upholding the lower court's sentence of eight years.

On 9 April 2020, the Supreme Court ruled in the third instance. Chin's convictions for raping two women became final, with sentences of four years for each count. The portion of the case concerning the alleged rape of a female stylist was remanded for retrial, while acquittals relating to the other five alleged victims became final. On 14 April, Chin began serving his sentence at Taichung Prison. In December 2020, he was sentenced to another four years for the rape of the stylist. Prosecutors from the Taiwan High Prosecutors Office subsequently requested the High Court to determine the combined sentence for the three convictions. The High Court ruled that, because the offenses were similar in nature, methods, and motives, and because the degree of overlapping culpability was substantial, Chin should serve a combined prison term of seven years and eight months.

== Case ==
In July 2016, Chin became embroiled in multiple allegations of sexual assault. A stylist using the pseudonym "Pin Hsiao-pu" publicly accused him of deceiving or raping numerous women over the previous decade. According to her account, Chin would comfort the victims afterward and pretend to pursue romantic relationships with them, only to abandon them later. Eight women publicly recounted their experiences, and reports indicated that dozens more had not yet come forward.

According to the victims, Chin employed a variety of methods. One woman alleged that he hid behind a door, waited for her to enter, and then used force to overpower and rape her. Besides physical coercion, Chin often used emotional manipulation, telling women that he wanted them to bear his child before putting on a condom and forcing himself on them. He also allegedly claimed that a spiritual master known as the White Dragon King had instructed him to "replenish yin to strengthen yang", and used this as a pretext for sexual assault. On another occasion, he reportedly said that he had a fever and needed sexual intercourse to recover.

A seventh woman stated that Chin attended church services and visited temples with women not out of religious belief but as a means of seducing them and taking them home for sex. She asserted that Chin did not actually practice any religion. An eighth woman alleged that Chin repeatedly took her to inexpensive motels and had sexual intercourse with her when she was still a minor. She further claimed that, in order to save money, Chin later stopped renting rooms and instead assaulted her in his car.

Among Chin's alleged victims were four underage girls, and one reportedly underwent an abortion. A thirteenth woman stated that she had been forcibly taken into a room and lost her virginity. She alleged that Chin asked why she had not bled, and when she later discovered blood in the bathroom and informed him, he immediately rushed in to inspect it. She said she believed Chin had an obsession with virgins.

When asked to respond to the allegations, Chin merely stated that he was "not a heartthrob", closed his Facebook page, and disappeared from public view. On the evening before Typhoon Nepartak struck Taiwan on 7 July, Chin held a press conference accompanied by his lawyer. Tearfully denying rape and allegations that he had used the names of church elders to defraud others, he repeatedly bowed in apology and admitted that he had "serious problems in relationships", referring several times to "emotional deviations" that had caused him to make mistakes. When asked what he meant by "emotional deviations", Chin replied only that he had "relationship problems". When questioned regarding accusations that he had raped underage girls, he remained silent for several seconds and eventually said that everything he wished to say was contained in his written statement before leaving.

Female church members also accused Chin of sexually harassing women in church by blowing into their ears and touching their breasts. On 10 July, the "Home of Artists" church, to which Chin belonged, announced that it had decided to suspend him from all ministry and gatherings. The church urged him to confront his wrongdoing and stated that genuine repentance did not consist of eloquent words or finding excuses to conceal one's actions. It also expressed its deepest apologies, noting that women had become victims in a place that should have been devoted to knowing Jesus Christ.

On 4 November 2016, the Taipei District Prosecutors Office concluded its investigation into the case, determining that Chin had committed seven counts of rape and three counts of attempted rape. Among the victims were minors, including a 14-year-old schoolgirl. Prosecutors indicted Chin and sought a total sentence of 41 years.

According to a report by Next Magazine, "Pin Hsiao-pu" alleged that one of Chin's victims had been the girlfriend of a gang leader. Outraged, the man allegedly paid investigators and gathered information, compiling a list of more than seventy women whom he believed had been sexually assaulted by Chin. The stylist reportedly urged him to release the list publicly, but he declined, reasoning that many of the women had since married and that disclosure would inflict secondary trauma. Chin's lawyer stated only that Chin had disappeared and could no longer be contacted.
