= Typhoon Haima =

Pacific typhoon in 2016

Typhoon Haima (Lawin)
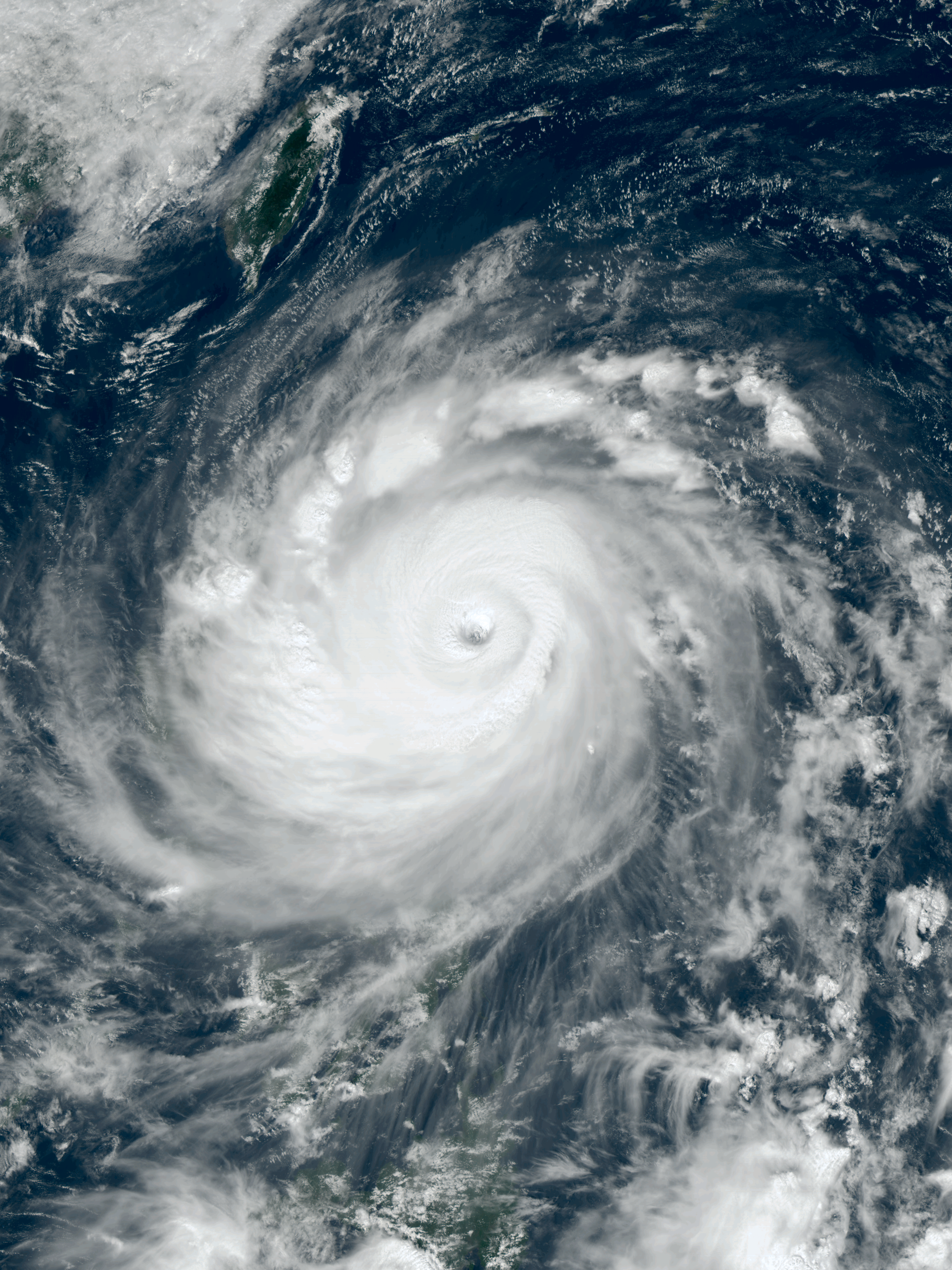
- Typhoon Haima at peak intensity approaching the Philippines on October 19

Meteorological history
- Formed: October 14, 2016
- Extratropical: October 22, 2016
- Dissipated: October 26, 2016

Violent typhoon
- 10-minute sustained (JMA)
- Highest winds: 215 km/h (130 mph)
- Lowest pressure: 900 hPa (mbar); 26.58 inHg

Category 5-equivalent super typhoon
- 1-minute sustained (SSHWS/JTWC)
- Highest winds: 270 km/h (165 mph)
- Lowest pressure: 914 hPa (mbar); 26.99 inHg

Overall effects
- Fatalities: 19 total
- Damage: $972 million (2016 USD)
- Areas affected: Caroline Islands; Philippines; Taiwan; China; Japan
- IBTrACS
- Part of the 2016 Pacific typhoon season

Typhoon Haima, (Note: The name Haima (Mandarin: 海马, [xaɪ˧˩˧ mä˧˩˧]) was contributed by China and refers to a seahorse in Mandarin.) known in the Philippines as Super Typhoon Lawin, was the third most intense tropical cyclone worldwide in 2016, tying with Nepartak. It was the twenty-second named storm and the eleventh typhoon of the 2016 Pacific typhoon season. Impacting the Philippines less than 3 days after Typhoon Sarika, Haima formed out of a tropical disturbance southwest of Chuuk State on October 14, it developed into a tropical storm the next day. Steady strengthening occurred over the next day or two as it tracked westward towards the Philippines. After forming an eye shortly after it was upgraded to a typhoon, Haima began to rapidly strengthen and eventually became a super typhoon on October 18. It later attained its peak intensity as a Category 5-equivalent tropical cyclone before weakening slightly. Haima later made landfall in Peñablanca, Cagayan, late on October 19 as a Category 4-equivalent storm. Rapid weakening occurred as it interacted with the landmasses until it entered the Southern China Sea as a weak typhoon. It formed a large ragged eye once again and remained steady in intensity until making landfall in China on October 21. It weakened below typhoon intensity and became extratropical on October 22. The cyclone drifted northeastwards and later eastwards before emerging over water again, but eventually dissipated by October 26.

19 people were killed by Haima, and damage totals were estimated at more than US$970 million. The storm forced several hundred flights in the Philippines, Hong Kong, and China to be cancelled. Ahead of the storm, several shelters were set up in the areas near China by the government to adequate the affected people Flooding and storm surge affected many coastal areas, downing several trees and power lines, leading to power outages. Due to the damage caused by the storm in the Philippines and China, the names Haima and Lawin were retired from their respective name lists in 2017. They were replaced by Mulan and Leon.

== Meteorological history ==
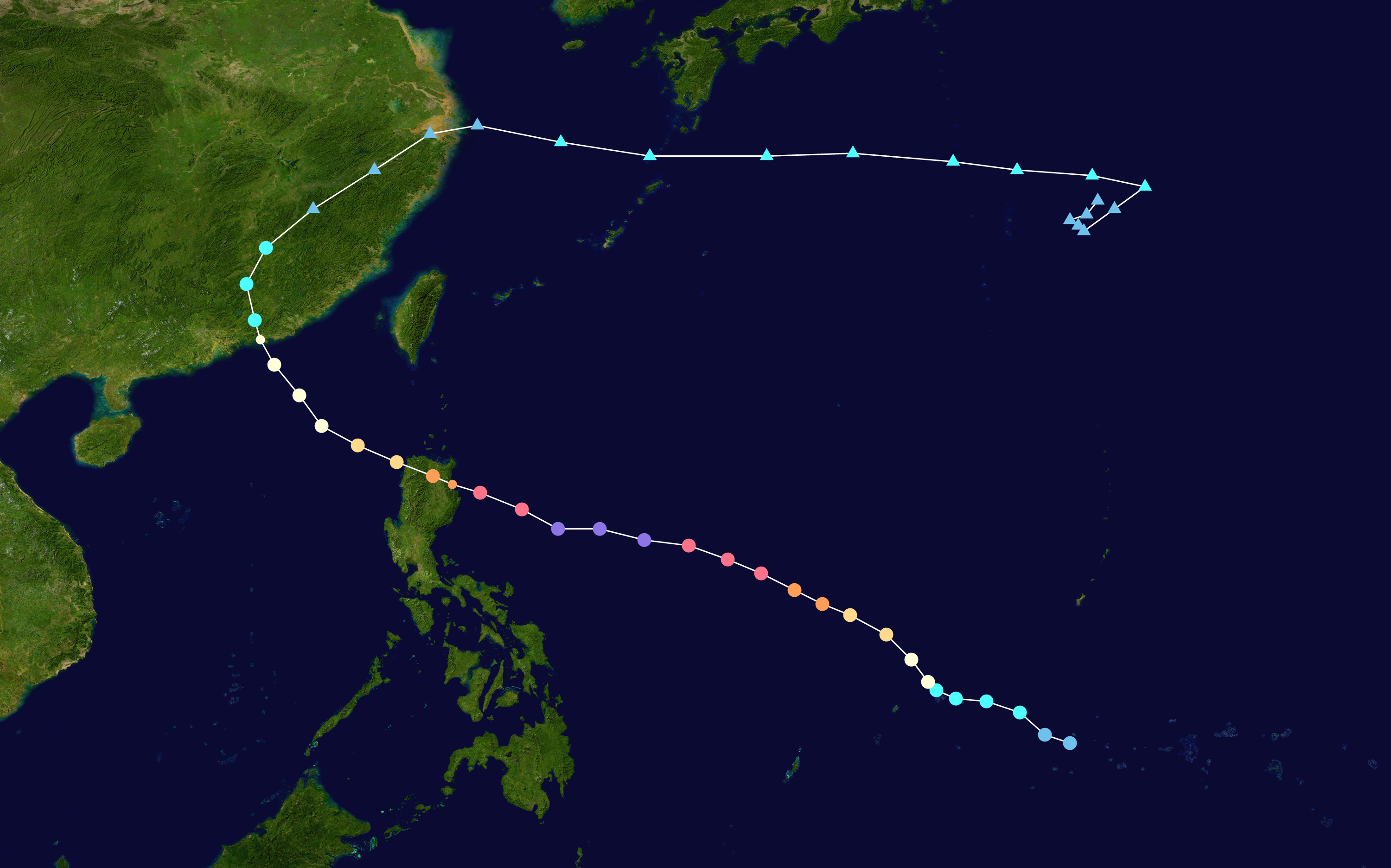
Map plotting the storm's track and intensity, according to the Saffir–Simpson scale Map key Saffir–Simpson scale Tropical depression (≤38 mph, ≤62 km/h) Tropical storm (39–73 mph, 63–118 km/h) Category 1 (74–95 mph, 119–153 km/h) Category 2 (96–110 mph, 154–177 km/h) Category 3 (111–129 mph, 178–208 km/h) Category 4 (130–156 mph, 209–251 km/h) Category 5 (≥157 mph, ≥252 km/h) Unknown Storm type Tropical cyclone Subtropical cyclone Extratropical cyclone, remnant low, tropical disturbance, or monsoon depression

During October 13, the United States Joint Typhoon Warning Center (JTWC) started to monitor a tropical disturbance, that had developed about 705 km (440 mi) to the south-southeast of the Anderson Air Force Base in Guam. The system was located within a favourable environment for further development, with low vertical wind shear, warm sea surface temperatures and its dual outflow channels being enhanced by a TUTT Cell located to its northwest. During that day, the system moved north-westwards under the influence of a subtropical ridge of high pressure to its north and rapidly developed a low level circulation center. During October 14, the JTWC and Japan Meteorological Agency (JMA) classified the disturbance as a tropical depression, while it was located within the Caroline Islands about 700 km (435 mi) to the south of Guam. During that day, the depression’s low level circulation center continued to rapidly consolidate, while bands of atmospheric convection built and wrapped into the center. As a result, both the JMA and JTWC reported that the depression had developed into a tropical storm, with the JMA naming it Haima. (Note: The name Haima (Mandarin: 海马, [xaɪ˧˩˧ mä˧˩˧]) was contributed by China and means seahorse in Mandarin.)

Immediately after the JMA indicated that Haima had intensified into a severe tropical storm at 00:00 UTC on October 16, the JTWC upgraded it to a typhoon because of improving banding; six hours later, the JMA also upgraded Haima to a typhoon, approximately 140 km (87 mi) northeast of Yap. Tracking west-northwestward along a subtropical ridge to the north, Haima began to form an eye. The typhoon entered the Philippine Area of Responsibility early on October 17 and received the name Lawin (hawk) from PAGASA, shortly before it deepened further with a sharply-outlined eye. Later, an eyewall replacement cycle occurred, as microwave satellite imagery revealed a solid inner ring of deep convection with a secondary outer ring.

Infrared satellite loop of Typhoon Haima making landfall over Peñablanca, Cagayan on October 19

Haima completed the eyewall replacement cycle by the morning on October 18. At this time, the JTWC upgraded it to a super typhoon. Several hours later, Haima presented a highly symmetric and tightly wound spiral structure with a 55 km (34 mi)-wide eye. There was a prominent anticyclone feature to the north blocking the usual poleward outflow channel, but given the impressive appearance, the restriction to flow was apparently having limited impact. Located in an area of warm sea surface temperatures near 30 °C, Haima reached peak intensity at around 18:00 UTC, with the central pressure at 900 hPa (27 inHg) and ten-minute maximum sustained winds at 215 km/h (134 mph). That intensity made Haima the second most intense tropical cyclone of the Northwest Pacific Ocean in 2016, after Typhoon Meranti. Simultaneously, the JTWC estimated one-minute maximum sustained winds at 270 km/h (170 mph), equivalent to Category 5 on the Saffir–Simpson scale. As Haima continued approaching and interacting with Luzon on October 19, the core convection became elongated with another eyewall replacement cycle, leading to a weakening trend and a cloud-filled eye. The JTWC downgraded Haima to a Category 4-equivalent typhoon with 1-minute sustained winds of 220 km/h (140 mph). Subsequently, the system made landfall over Peñablanca, Cagayan of the Philippines at 23:00 PST (15:00 UTC).

When Haima entered the South China Sea shortly before 08:00 PST (00:00 UTC) on October 20, the typhoon had weakened significantly but become larger. Although Haima kept deteriorating gradually over decreasing ocean heat content, the system soon regained a ragged 150 km (93 mi)-wide eye. Environmental conditions at this time included increasing vertical wind shear slightly offset by good dual outflow channels. Turning north-northwestward along the periphery of a subtropical ridge positioned to the north and east, Haima made landfall over Haifeng County, Shanwei in the Guangdong province of China at 12:40 CST (04:40 UTC) on October 21. Several hours later, Haima weakened into a severe tropical storm owing to the rugged terrain, and the JTWC issued its final warning on the system. The system further weakened into a tropical storm at 12:00 UTC and ultimately a tropical depression in the Jiangxi province at 18:00 UTC.

At around 08:00 CST (00:00 UTC) on October 22, Haima became extratropical and accelerated northeastward. Emerging into Hangzhou Bay right before 20:00 CST (12:00 UTC), the low then entered the East China Sea and turned eastward. The system developed into a gale-force low near the Tokara Islands early on October 23. Tracking eastward south of Japan, the system weakened into a low below gale-force about 420 km (260 mi) east of Chichijima, at around 09:00 JST (00:00 UTC) on October 25. It then wandered around the area and dissipated early on October 26.

== Preparations, impact and aftermath ==
=== Highest Public Storm Warning Signal ===
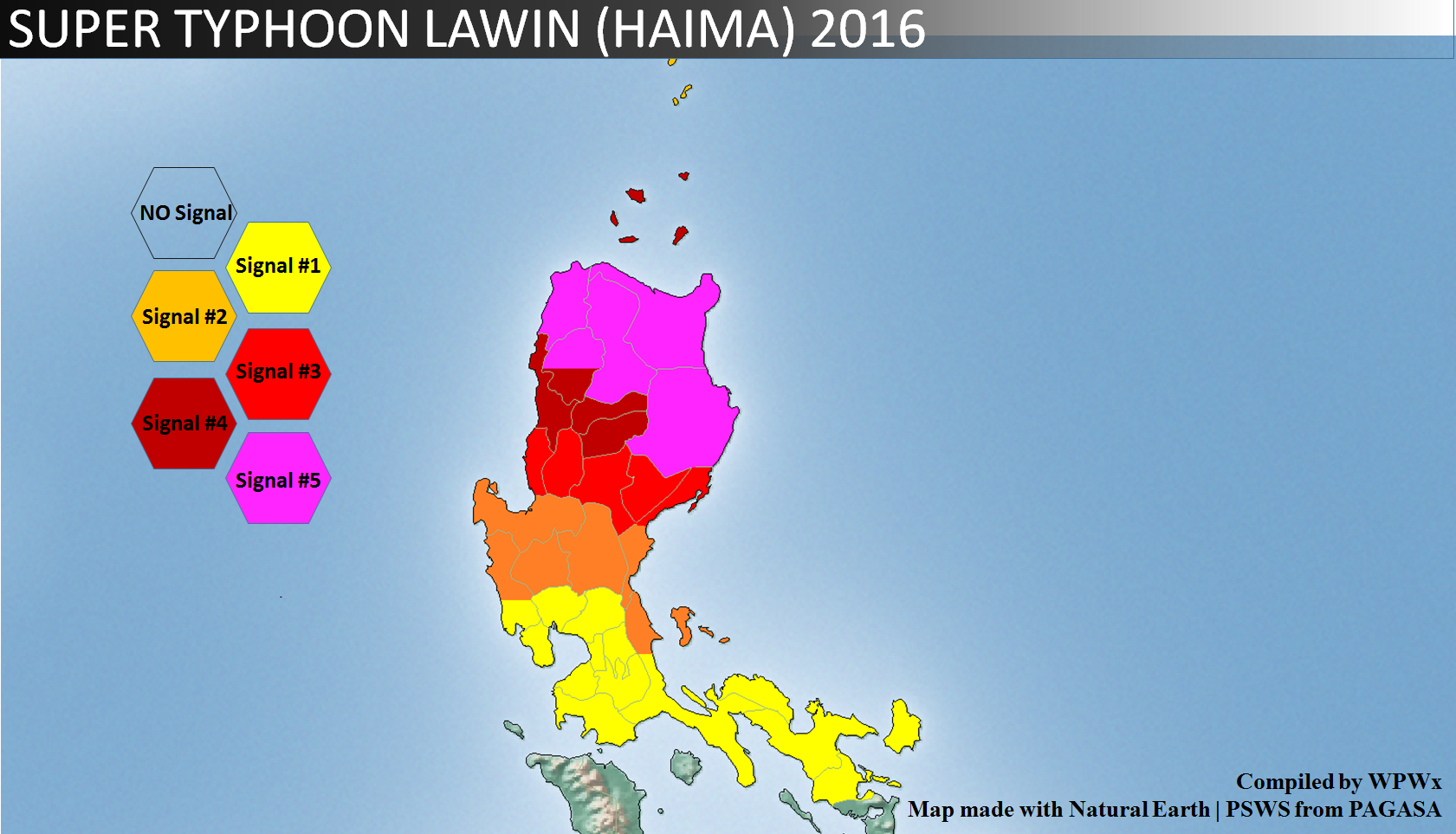
Highest PSWS raised by PAGASA across the Philippines in relation to Super Typhoon Lawin (Haima)

PSWS#	Luzon	Visayas	Mindanao
5	Cagayan, Isabela, Apayao, Kalinga, Northern Portion of Abra, Ilocos Norte	None	None
4	Ilocos Sur, Rest of Abra, Mt. Province, Ifugao, Calayan Group of Islands	None	None
3	La Union, Benguet, Nueva Vizcaya, Quirino, Northern Portion of Aurora	None	None
2	Batanes, Pangasinan, Rest of Aurora, Tarlac, Nueva Ecija, Northern Portion of Zambales, Northern Portion of Quezon including Polillo Island	None	None
1	Metro Manila, Rest of Zambales, Bulacan, Bataan, Pampanga, Rizal, Rest of Quezon, Cavite, Laguna, Batangas, Camarines Norte, Camarines Sur, Catanduanes, Albay	None	None

During the passage of Haima, Signal 5 was given by the PAGASA. According to the National Disaster Risk Reduction and Management Council (NDRRMC), Haima killed 18 people in total, and damages had reached up to ₱3.74 billion (US$77.6 million).

=== Hong Kong ===
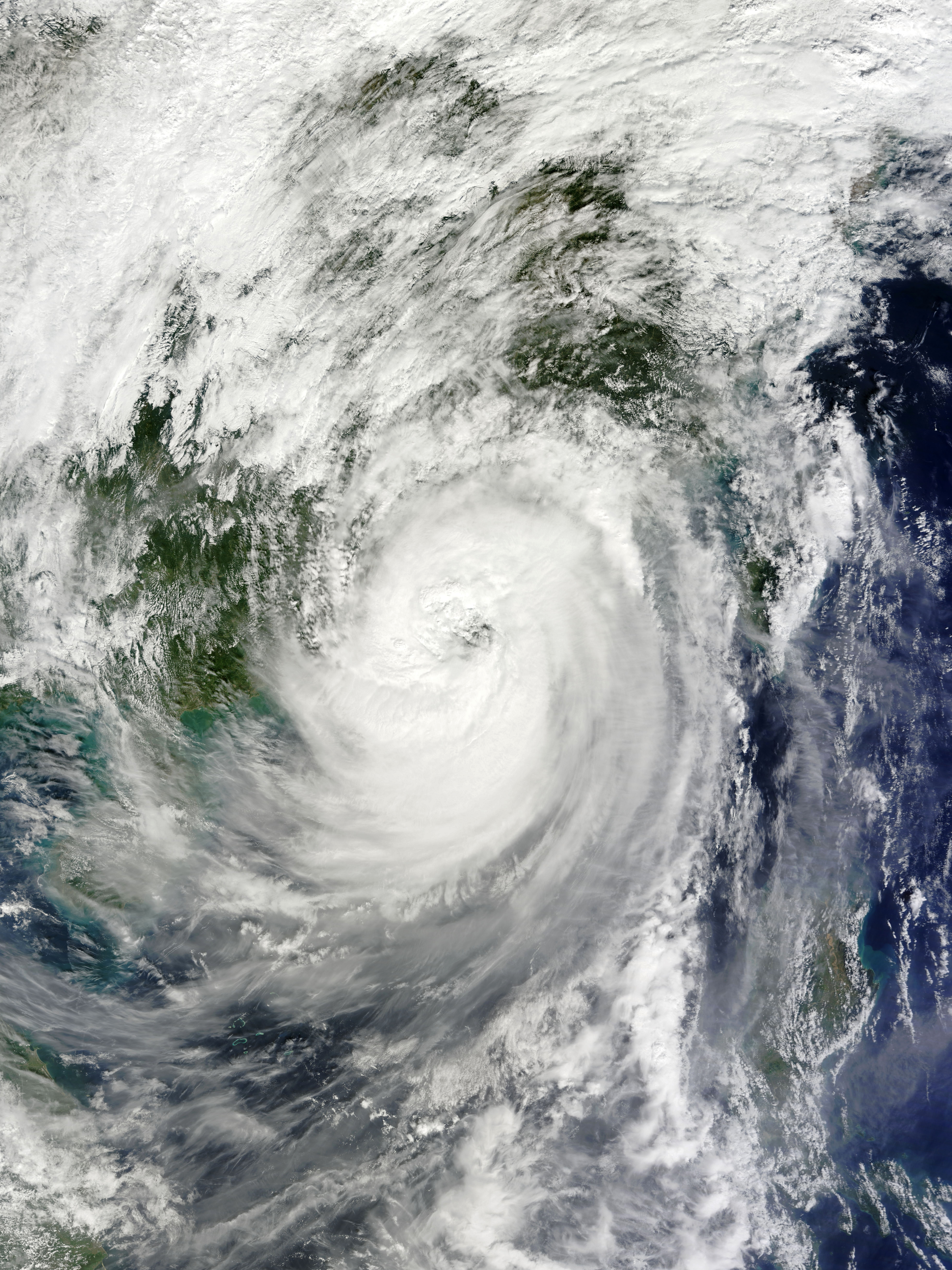
Typhoon Haima made landfall in Guangdong, China on October 21

The approach of Haima prompted the Hong Kong Observatory to issue the No. 8 Gale or Storm Signal; schools and businesses were suspended and roads and pavements empty as Haima passed as close as 110 km (68 mi) east-northeast of the city in the early afternoon of 21 October. “As the western part of Haima’s eyewall is rather close to Hong Kong, gales will affect the territory for some time,” said the observatory, warning the public to steer clear of the waterfront due to rough seas. However, many residents ignored the warning and watched the storm. Haima brought heavy rainfall and gusts of up to 105 kilometres per hour, as waves crashed over and flooded coastal roads and trees were knocked down by winds. Over 700 flights in and out of Hong Kong were cancelled, trading on the city's stock exchange was stopped on 21 October, and ferry services such as Hong Kong's famous cross-harbour Star Ferry were cancelled. All bus services were halted and underground metro trains were slowed. More than 20 shelters were set up by the government in preparation for the storm. One person was killed and damages have totalled to HK$5 billion (US$644.7 million).

=== Macau ===
The approach of Haima led to the Macau Meteorological and Geophysical Bureau issuing the No. 8 tropical cyclone signal at 08:30 local time for the first time in 2016. However, winds at Macau were much lighter than neighbouring Hong Kong, as the intense rainbands associated with Haima just missed the territory. The No. 3 signal was eventually issued to replace the No. 8 signal at 15:30. The SMG later explained that as Haima took on a more eastward track during the day on 21 October, the intense rainbands and associated gales that were forecast to affect Macau eventually did not impact the territory directly.

=== Mainland China ===
Total economic losses in South China were counted to be ¥1.69 billion (US$249.9 million).

== Retirement ==
On October 26, PAGASA has announced that the name Lawin will be removed from their naming lists due to the widespread destruction it caused and as well as causing over ₱1 billion in damages and had added to the damage caused by Typhoon Sarika (Karen). On January 17, 2017, PAGASA chose the name Leon to replace Lawin for the 2020 season.

During the 49th annual session of the ESCAP/WMO Typhoon Committee in 2017, they announced that the name Haima will be removed from the naming lists. In March 2018, the Typhoon Committee subsequently chose Mulan as its replacement name.

== See also ==
- Weather of 2016
- Tropical cyclones in 2016
- List of Philippine typhoons (2000–present)
