= Typhoon Nepartak =

Pacific typhoon in 2016

Typhoon Nepartak (Butchoy)
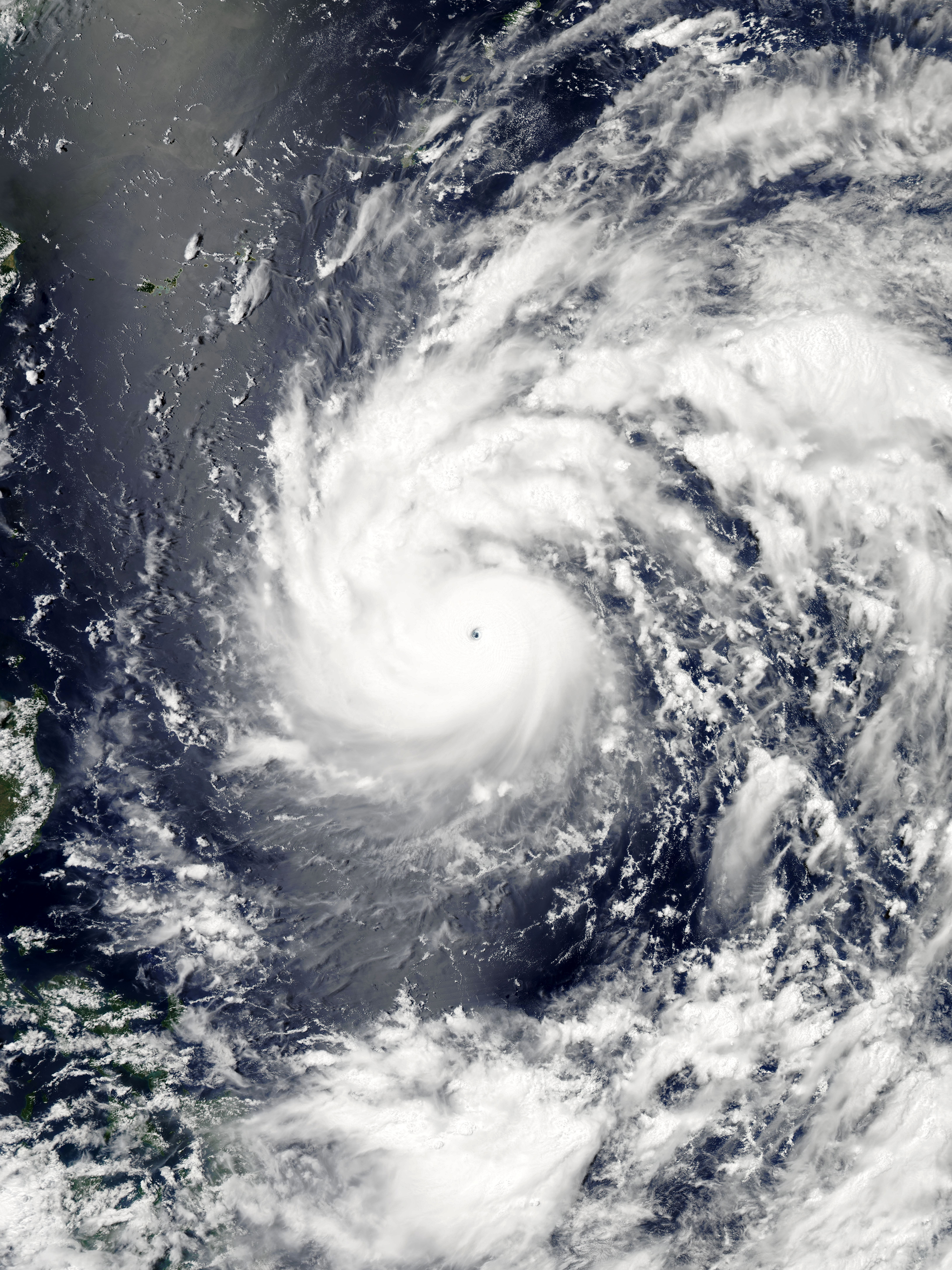
- Typhoon Nepartak at peak intensity with a pinhole eye on July 6

Meteorological history
- Formed: July 2, 2016
- Dissipated: July 10, 2016

Violent typhoon
- 10-minute sustained (JMA)
- Highest winds: 205 km/h (125 mph)
- Lowest pressure: 900 hPa (mbar); 26.58 inHg

Category 5-equivalent super typhoon
- 1-minute sustained (SSHWS/JTWC)
- Highest winds: 285 km/h (180 mph)
- Lowest pressure: 907 hPa (mbar); 26.78 inHg

Overall effects
- Fatalities: 111 total
- Damage: $1.89 billion (2016 USD)
- Areas affected: Caroline Islands, Mariana Islands, Philippines, Ryukyu Islands, Taiwan, East China
- IBTrACS
- Part of the 2016 Pacific typhoon season

Typhoon Nepartak, (Note: The name Nepartak (Kosraean: Nepartak, [nepaːɽtaːk]) was contributed by the Federated States of Micronesia and refers to a legendary Kosraean warrior who conquered Pohnpei.) known in the Philippines as Typhoon Butchoy, was the third most intense tropical cyclone worldwide in 2016, tied with Haima. Nepartak severely impacted Taiwan and East China, with 86 confirmed fatalities. It caused 3 deaths and NT$678 million (US$21 million) of damage in Taiwan during early-July. Moreover, Nepartak also had disastrous effects in Fujian, China, causing 111 deaths and ¥9.99 billion (US$1.49 billion) of damage. After the season, total damages exceeded up to ¥12.65 billion (US$1.89 billion).

The first named storm and typhoon of the annual typhoon season, Nepartak developed into a tropical storm south of Guam on July 3 and ended a record-tied 199-day period without a named storm over the basin, tied with the 1997–1998 interval. Steadily tracking northwestward on July 4 and becoming a typhoon on the next day, Nepartak reached peak intensity with a pinhole eye on July 6. Nepartak started to weaken on July 7 and then crossed Taiwan later, before emerging into the Taiwan Strait and weakening into a severe tropical storm on July 8. It eventually made landfall over Fujian, China on July 9 and dissipated over land one day later.

== Meteorological history ==
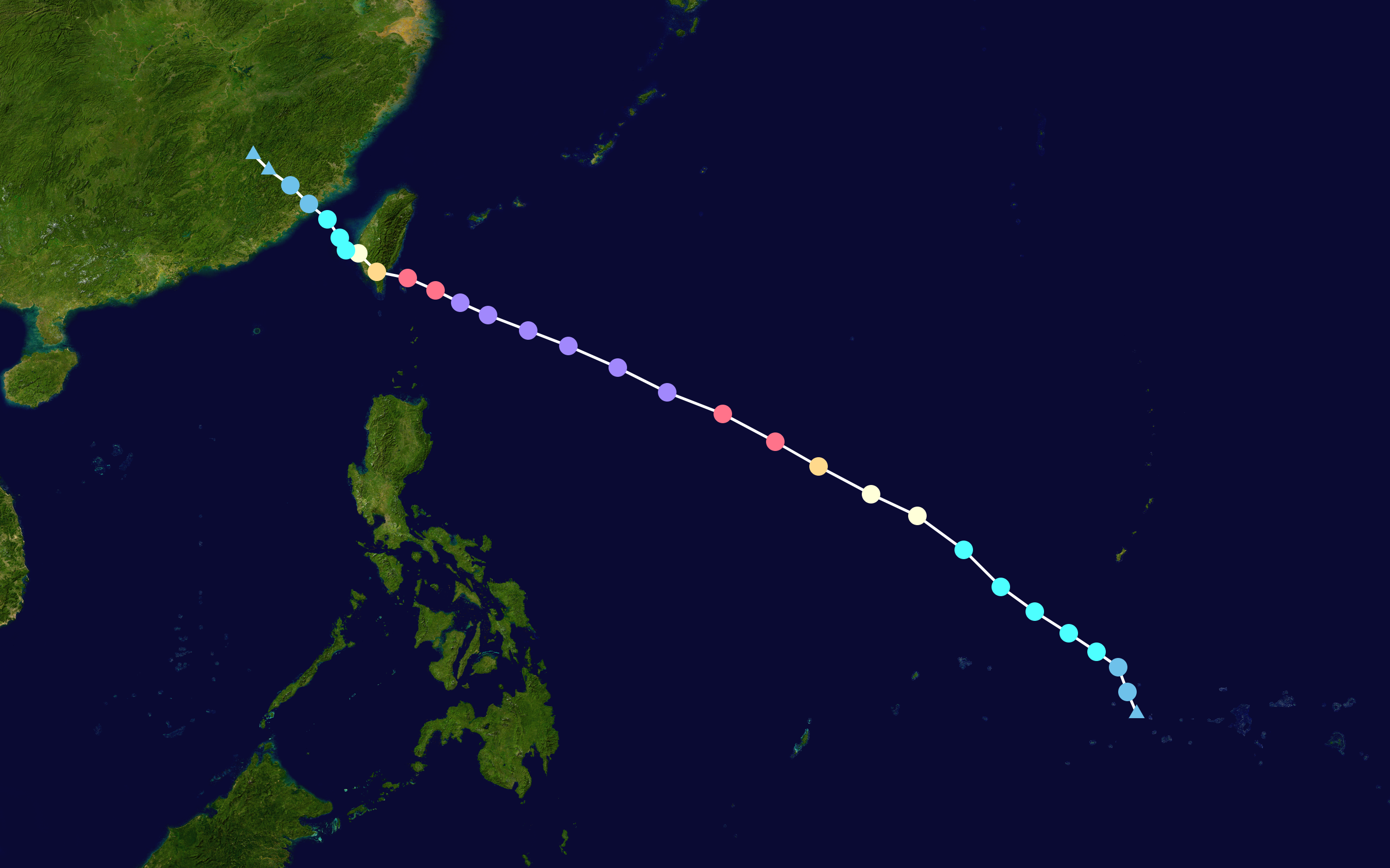
Map plotting the storm's track and intensity, according to the Saffir–Simpson scale Map key Saffir–Simpson scale Tropical depression (≤38 mph, ≤62 km/h) Tropical storm (39–73 mph, 63–118 km/h) Category 1 (74–95 mph, 119–153 km/h) Category 2 (96–110 mph, 154–177 km/h) Category 3 (111–129 mph, 178–208 km/h) Category 4 (130–156 mph, 209–251 km/h) Category 5 (≥157 mph, ≥252 km/h) Unknown Storm type Tropical cyclone Subtropical cyclone Extratropical cyclone, remnant low, tropical disturbance, or monsoon depression

A low-pressure area developed south of Guam on June 30. During July 2, the Japan Meteorological Agency started to monitor a broad tropical depression that had developed about 780 km (485 mi) to the southeast of Yap State. The depression was located within a favourable environment for further development with low vertical wind shear, while global computer models indicated that the system would slowly develop further as it interacted with an upper level low. During that day as the depression intensified as it moved north-westwards in a weak steering environment, while deep atmospheric convection started to wrap into the system's consolidating low level circulation centre. Early on July 3, the United States Joint Typhoon Warning Center initiated advisories on the system and classified it as Tropical Depression 02W. The system was subsequently named Nepartak by the JMA after it had intensified into a tropical storm, and an Ascat pass had shown that winds of 65 km/h (40 mph) existed within the storms eastern quadrant. The naming of Nepartak brought to an end a record 199 day period without a tropical storm within the Western North Pacific basin.

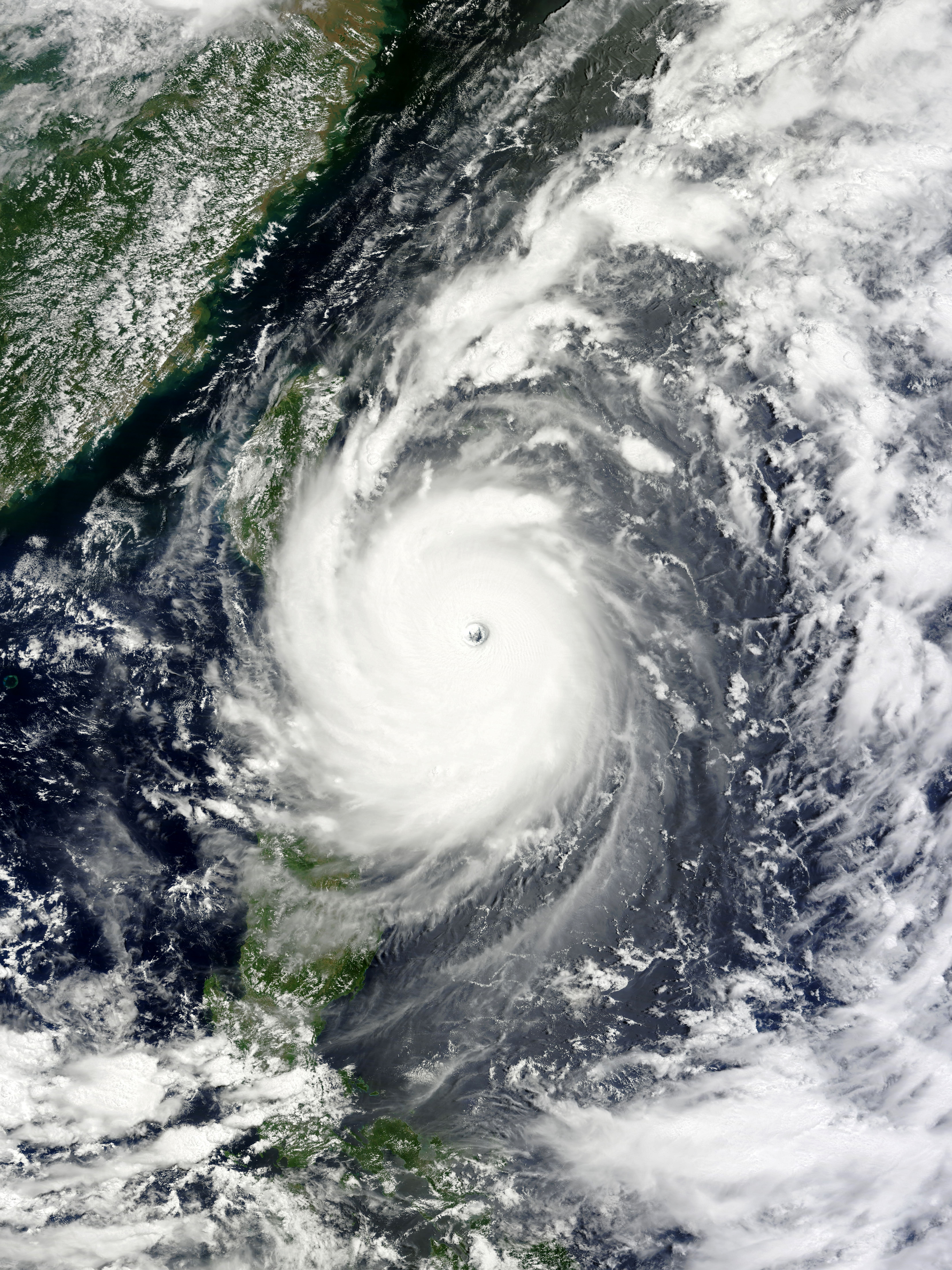
Typhoon Nepartak approaching Taiwan on July 7

After being named, Nerpartak started to accelerate north-westwards, as a subtropical ridge to the north of the system, became better established and acted as the dominant steering mechanism. Over the next couple of days the system gradually intensified further as its upper level outflow improved, as a TUTT cell positioned to the north of Nepartak propagated westwards. Thus, around 12:00 UTC, the JMA upgraded it to a severe tropical storm, and the system developed a large central dense overcast (CDO) with tightly curved convective banding. Both the JMA and the JTWC upgraded Nepartak to a typhoon early the next day, and afterwards the system underwent a period of rapid deepening. The system entered the Philippine Area of Responsibility approximately at 06:00 UTC (14:00 PHT), upon which PAGASA assigned it the local name Butchoy. Due to low vertical wind shear, excellent dual-outflow channels and very warm sea surface temperatures, above 30°C over the Philippine Sea, the compact and symmetric typhoon acquired annular characteristics and a well-defined eye on the evening on July 5. This prompted the JTWC to upgrade it to a Category 4-equivalent super typhoon around 18:00 UTC. On July 6, the JTWC estimated that Nepartak had become a Category 5-equivalent super typhoon. Featuring a distinct eye, Nepartak reached its peak intensity at around 06:00 UTC, about 835 km (519 mi) east-southeast of Taitung, Taiwan. The JMA estimated the central pressure at 900 hPa (26.58 inHg) and ten-minute maximum sustained winds at 205 km/h (125 mph). The JTWC estimated one-minute maximum sustained winds at 285 km/h (180 mph).

Maintaining peak intensity for a day, Nepartak started to slow down and weaken on July 7, owing to the topography of Taiwan inhibiting the inflow on the western side of the low-level circulation. By 12:00 UTC, Nepartak's eye had become ragged and cloud-filled. Around that time, the typhoon passed close to a buoy near Orchid Island. The buoy observed a minimum pressure of roughly 897 hPa (26.49 inHg). This observation was scrutinized by a National Taiwan University team, and on September 13, the Institute of Oceanography of the National Taiwan University said that after calibrating the pressure sensor, they found that the lowest atmospheric pressure was in fact 911.5 hPa (26.91 inHg). Nepartak made landfall over Taimali, Taitung County at 21:50 UTC (05:50 Taiwan Time on July 8) and subsequently emerged into the Taiwan Strait from Jiangjun, Tainan at 06:30 UTC (14:30 Taiwan Time) on July 8. Weakening from a Category 4 super typhoon to a Category 1 equivalent-typhoon within 12 hours, as land interaction with Taiwan caused Nepartak's structure to degrade significantly, the mid-level circulation became decoupled from the LLCC. Therefore, despite a favorable upper-level environment, the typhoon could not re-strengthen; Nepartak featured warming cloud tops, an expanding cloud field and deepest convection confined to the northwest and southeast peripheries of the LLCC. Around 18:00 UTC, the JMA downgraded Nepartak to a severe tropical storm, and the JTWC downgraded it to a tropical storm. On July 9, immediately before the JMA further downgraded Nepartak to a tropical storm, the system made landfall over Shishi, Fujian at 05:45 UTC (13:45 CST). This resulted in decaying convection and an elongating LLCC, therefore the JTWC issued its final warning. In the afternoon, Nepartak continued moving inland as a tropical depression, and dissipated during July 10.

== Preparations ==
=== Taiwan ===
Video animation of Typhoon Nepartak weakening as it approached Taiwan on July 7

On July 6, the Central Weather Bureau raised land and sea warnings for the entirety of Taiwan, and forecast torrential rain for 14 counties and the capital city of Taipei during the typhoon's passage. The Government of Taiwan placed 35,817 military personnel—of which roughly 3,000 were deployed—along with 3,409 vehicles and 119 inflatable boats, on standby for relief efforts in conjunction with Typhoon Nepartak. Many were placed on alert to assist with evacuations in mountainous areas of Yilan and Hualien counties. Ninety shelters were opened throughout Taiwan. Approximately 3,000 tourists were evacuated from the outlying Green and Orchid islands and ferry service to these areas was suspended. Residents of Wutai Township in southern Taiwan were also relocated due to the threat of landslides and flooding. Ultimately, 154,000 people were evacuated across 14 counties and cities. Mandarin Airlines, TransAsia Airways, China Airlines, EVA Air, and Uni Air cancelled all flights for July 7 and many on July 8, encompassing all domestic flights and most international ones. Kaohsiung International Airport and Taoyuan International Airport are scheduled to close at 3 p.m. and 5 p.m. local time, respectively, on July 7. Approximately 500 flights were canceled due to the typhoon. In anticipation of heavy rain, water was released from the Shihmen Dam on the morning of July 7.

Trains operated by Taiwan High Speed Rail, Taiwan Railways Administration, and Alishan Forest Railway were all suspended starting the evening of July 7 or morning of July 8 and throughout the remainder of the typhoon's passage. Over a dozen sections of highway were also closed. Bus service in Taipei and New Taipei was halted for July 8. All schools and businesses closed for the day, except for in Kinmen County and the Matsu Islands. The Taiwan Water Corporation urged residents to stock up on water and reduce their usage of running water in advance of the typhoon. The agency readied purification plants in anticipation of extreme turbidity from rainfall runoff. The annual Taiwan International Balloon Festival in Taitung County cancelled activities for the afternoon of July 6 through July 8; the Morning Glow in Sanxiantai was also delayed until July 9.

=== China ===
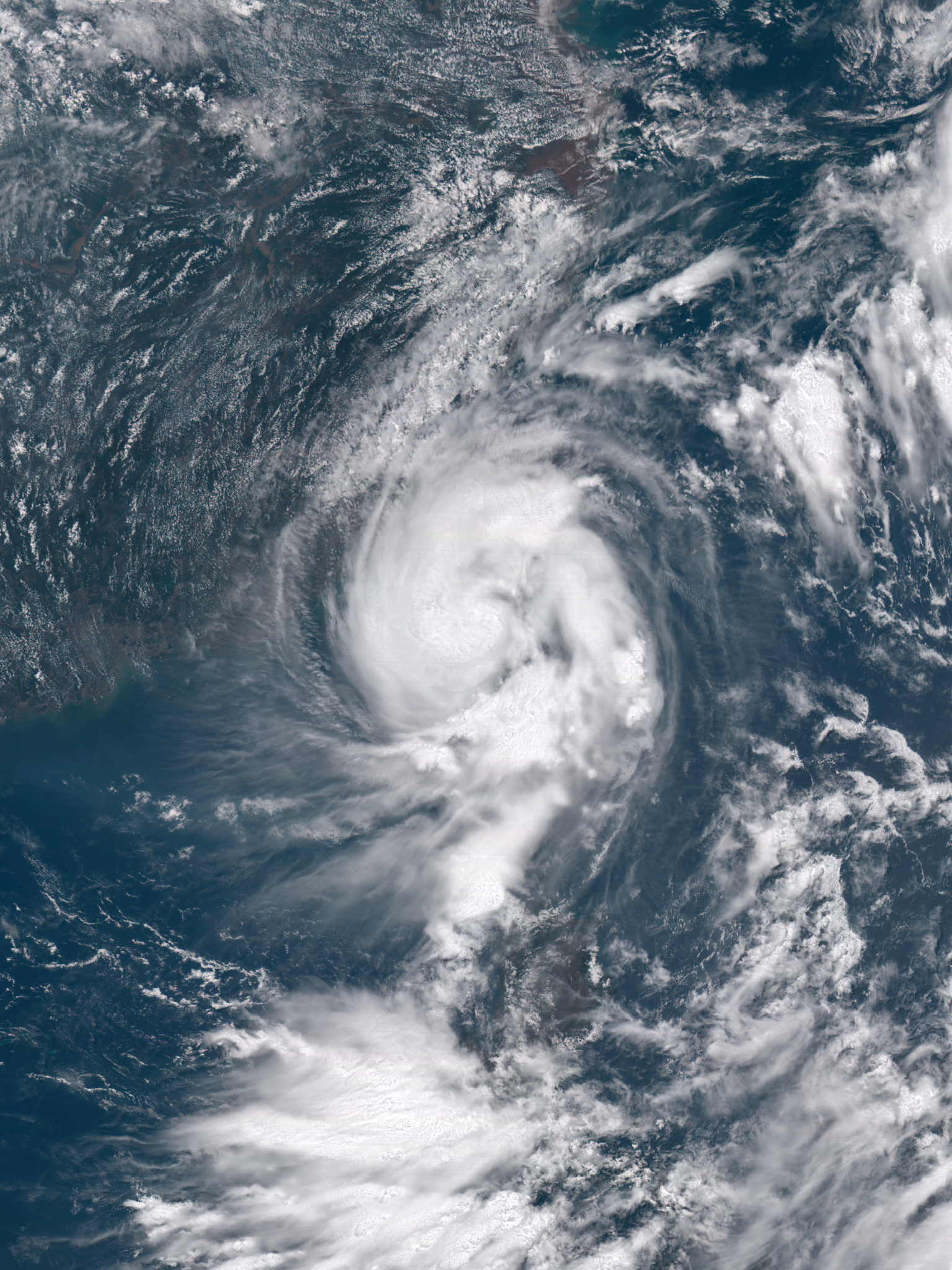
A weakening Typhoon Nepartak over southern Taiwan on July 8

Officials across multiple provinces in East China feared that the storm would worsen the ongoing floods that had already claimed at least 186 lives. Particular concern was raised over lakes and reservoirs along the Yangtze River, especially Lake Tai, that could overflow due to heavy rain from the typhoon. Residents in Fujian and Zhejiang provinces were alerted of a potentially damaging storm surge, while authorities in Guangdong province ordered all fishermen to return to port. Across coastal Fujian, approximately 33,000 fishing boats returned to port and 35,000 people working along the coast were urged to evacuate inland. Approximately 420,000 people were evacuated across Fujian and another 37,521 people were relocated in Wenzhou, Zhejiang. On July 9 at 11 a.m. local time, Fujian province issued an orange typhoon alert, the second highest alert level. Public transportation was severely disrupted, with 5,000 buses, 400 flights, and 300 high-speed trains canceled.

=== Elsewhere ===
Residents across the Ryukyu Islands—a Japanese archipelago extending south-southwest from the mainland toward Taiwan—were alerted of potentially dangerous conditions beginning on July 5. Some evacuations took place on the Yaeyama Islands and Miyako Islands in anticipation of flooding and typhoon-force winds.

Fishermen in the northern Philippines were advised not to venture out due to rough seas. Meteorologists in the nation also advised that the typhoon would enhance the local monsoon, bringing rain and thunderstorms to many areas in the Northern part of the Philippine islands. Public Storm Warning Signal 1 was raised for the Babuyan Islands, Batanes, and Calayan. The national government also suspended work in Metro Manila in the afternoon of July 8 owing to inclement weather caused by the typhoon.

== Impact and aftermath ==
=== Taiwan ===
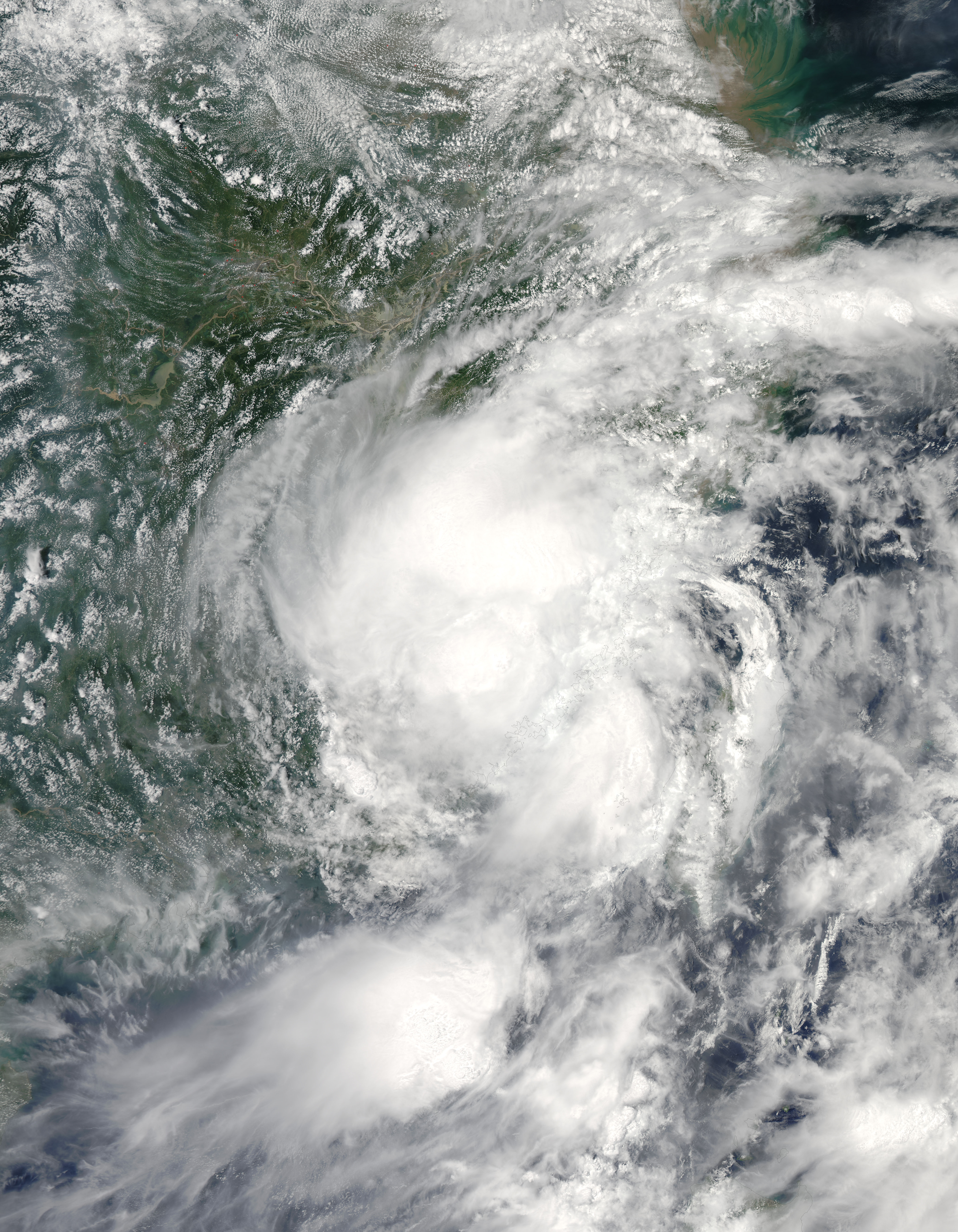
Tropical Storm Nepartak over eastern China on July 9

On July 7, two people drowned in storm-related incidents: one at Chihsingtan Beach in Hualien County and the other in Penghu. At least one person was killed during the storm's landfall after being struck by debris. More than 142 people sustained injuries, primarily from shattered glass or airborne debris. Wind gusts of up to 205 km/h (127 mph) were observed in Taitung County, the highest recorded wind in the county in 61 years of record keeping; the powerful winds toppled trees and power lines, tore apart roofs, and flipped vehicles. At the height of the storm, 545,696 households lost power and 24,829 lost water supplies. Preliminary estimates of damage in Taitung County alone exceeded NT$2 billion (US$62 million) by July 9. Preliminary estimates of agricultural damage reached NT$1.07 billion (US$33.2 million), of which NT$731.39 million (US$22.7 million) was incurred by Taitung County. Custard apples suffered the greatest losses, with 4,198 hectares (10,370 acres) lost, followed by bananas. Seven major highways, including No. 7 and No. 23 were damaged. At the port of Kaohsiung, the Singapore-flagged cargo ship Avata was torn from its moorings in a harbor it was sheltering in; two tow vessels had to bring it back to port.

In Nepartak's wake, the Taiwan Power Company dispatched 2,000 personnel to repair downed power lines and clear debris. By 6:00 p.m. local time on July 8, only 50,000 households remained without electricity. The Red Cross Society of the Republic of China pledged to provide each affected household with NT$10,000 (US$310). On July 9, Premier Lin Chuan toured damaged areas of Taitung and ordered a NT$300 million (US$9.3 million) relief package. Although China temporarily ceased communications with Taiwan following the inauguration of Tsai Ing-wen, the country's Taiwan Affairs Office expressed concern and offered their condolences to victims of the typhoon. The Tzu Chi Foundation pledged NT$10,000–30,000 (US$310–930) as well as living essentials.

Many individuals offered donations and funds to assist in recovery efforts. One of the wealthiest people in Taiwan, Hon Hai Precision Industry Chairman Terry Gou, provided NT$10 million (US$310,100) for reconstruction efforts. The convenience store chains 7-Eleven and FamilyMart partnered with Gou to set up electronic donations at more than 5,000 locations on July 9. Pop artist A-mei donated NT$2 million (US$62,020) to her home county of Taitung. Similarly, the rock band Mayday and singer Jia Jia jointly gave NT$2 million (US$62,020). Political parties also provided monetary support: the ruling Democratic Progressive Party provided NT$500,000 (US$15,500), the Kuomintang Party pledged NT$1 million (US$31,000), and the New Power Party gave NT$300,000 (US$9,300). The Legislative Yuan donated NT$500,000 (US$15,500) and the legislature's speaker Su Jia-chyuan provided an additional NT$100,000 (US$3,100). The mayors of Taipei and Taoyuan, Ko Wen-je and Cheng Wen-tsan, donated NT$200,000 (US$6,200) and NT$100,000 (US$3,100), respectively, while several other government officials pledged to donate their daily salaries.

Taiwan's Council of Agriculture pledged to provided financial assistance to farmers in Taitung, Pingtung, and Kaohsiung counties.

=== China ===
Heavy rain—amounting to 250 mm (9.8 in) in just a few hours in Putian—and strong winds battered Fujian. Winds up to 100 km/h (62 mph) were observed in Shishi. Widespread flooding and many landslides occurred, particularly in mountainous areas, destroying an unspecified number of buildings. A landslide in Gutian County buried a factory, trapping 18 workers; all were later rescued by police and firefighters. Forty-three people required rescue due to rising waters in Putian. At least 10 people were killed and 11 others were rendered missing across Fujian and Jiangxi. At least 3,144 homes were destroyed and 15,800 hectares (39,000 acres) of crops were damaged; total economic losses reached ¥2.2 billion (US$320 million). Damage was particularly severe in Minqing County, Fujian, where at least 1,000 people required rescue. A level 4 disaster emergency was declared for affected areas, allowing for a large distribution of relief materials.

== See also ==
- Weather of 2016
- List of the most intense tropical cyclones
- Typhoon Bilis (2000)
- Typhoon Haitang (2005)
- Typhoon Sepat (2007)
- Typhoon Soudelor (2015)
- Typhoon Dujuan (2015)
- Typhoon Meranti (2016)
- Typhoon Koinu (2023)
- Typhoon Gaemi (2024)
- Typhoon Podul (2025)
