= Typhoon Sepat =

Pacific typhoon in 2007

Typhoon Sepat (Egay)
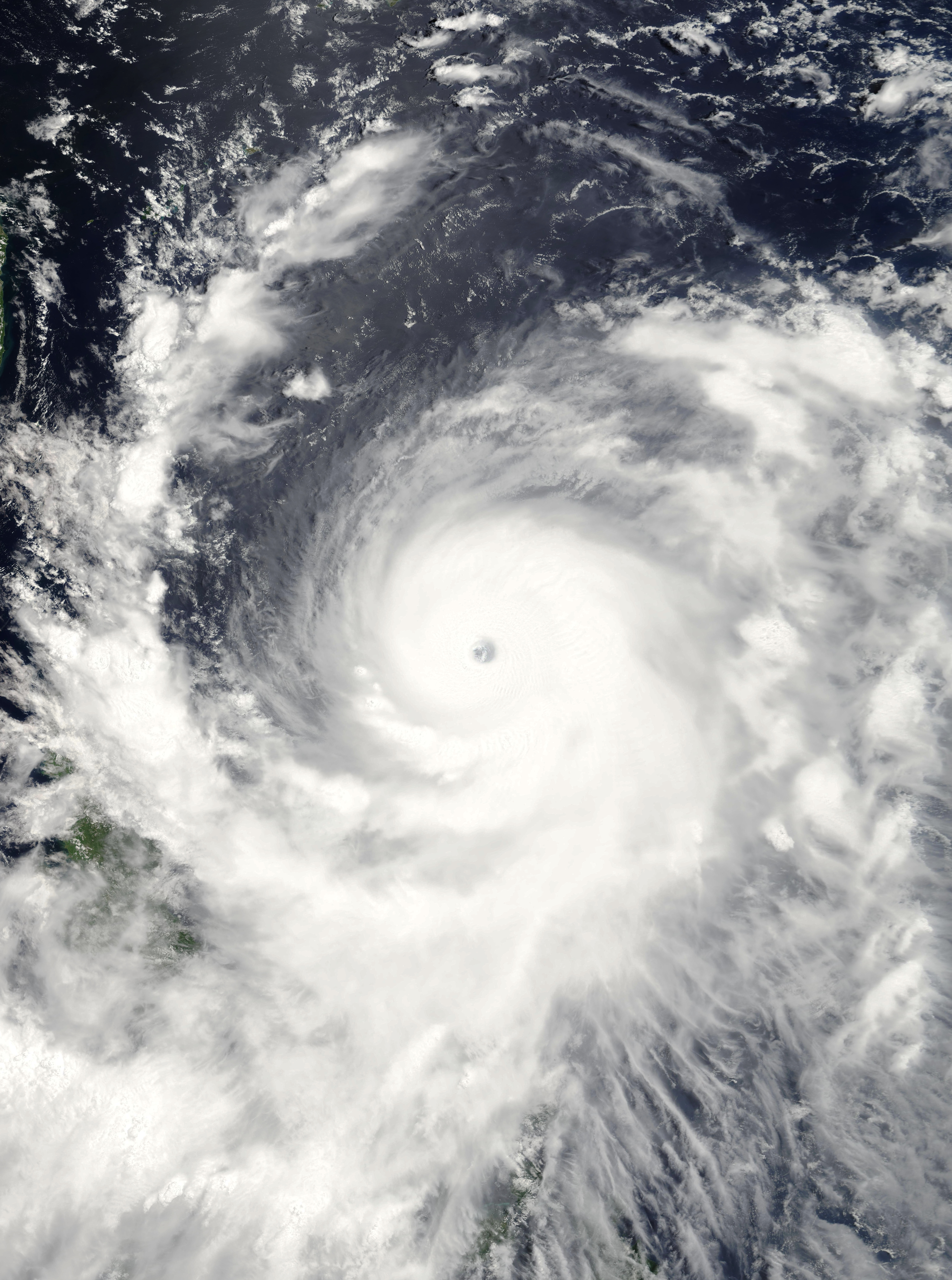
- Typhoon Sepat at peak intensity on August 16

Meteorological history
- Formed: August 12, 2007
- Remnant low: August 20, 2007
- Dissipated: August 24, 2007

Violent typhoon
- 10-minute sustained (JMA)
- Highest winds: 205 km/h (125 mph)
- Lowest pressure: 910 hPa (mbar); 26.87 inHg

Category 5-equivalent super typhoon
- 1-minute sustained (SSHWS/JTWC)
- Highest winds: 260 km/h (160 mph)
- Lowest pressure: 918 hPa (mbar); 27.11 inHg

Overall effects
- Fatalities: >43 total
- Damage: >$693 million (2007 USD)
- Areas affected: Philippines, Taiwan, China
- IBTrACS
- Part of the 2007 Pacific typhoon season

Typhoon Sepat, (Note: The name Sepat (Malay: sepat, [səpat]) was contributed by Malaysia and means gourami in Malay.) known in the Philippines as Super Typhoon Egay, was the eighth named tropical storm and the strongest tropical cyclone of the 2007 Pacific typhoon season, that affected the Philippines and made landfall in Taiwan and Fujian in mid August 2007. Sepat originated on August 11 via a low-circulation center SE of Naha, Okinawa, and was named by the Japan Meteorological Agency as Sepat on August 12 and Egay in the Philippines by PAGASA as it entered the PAR. Sepat underwent an explosive intensification on the night of August 13, reaching peak intensity at Category 5-equivalent super typhoon intensity the following morning. The storm maintained its strength for 2 days, until it underwent an eyewall replacement cycle, just before the storm makes landfall in Taiwan on August 17 (+21:00 UTC) as a Category 3-equivalent typhoon. After crossing the Taiwanese strait, Sepat; already weakening into Category 1 status due to unfavorable conditions, made a second landfall in China on August 18, 2007. The storm persisted across mainland China, as it transitioned into an extratropical cyclone on August 20, and Sepat, now an extratropical low continued through China until it finally dissipated near Yunnan Province on August 24.

More than 43 deaths were directly blamed on Sepat; 3 out of the 43 were from the Philippines due to drowning brought on by heavy rains from the southwest monsoon enhanced by Sepat, with total insured losses estimated at $692 million (2007 USD), or $869.66 million (2020 USD; adjusted for inflation).

== Meteorological history ==
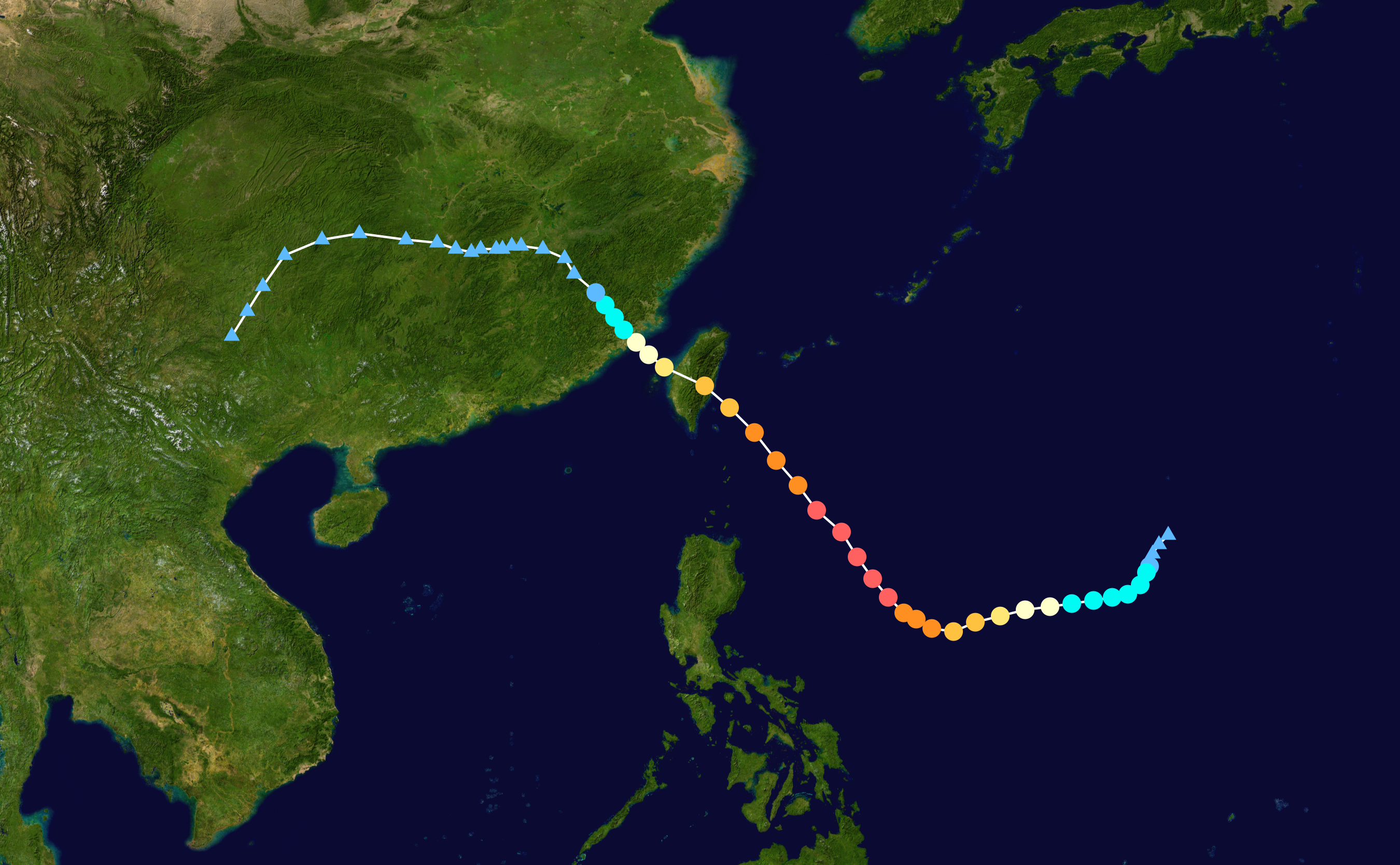
Map plotting the storm's track and intensity, according to the Saffir–Simpson scale Map key Saffir–Simpson scale Tropical depression (≤38 mph, ≤62 km/h) Tropical storm (39–73 mph, 63–118 km/h) Category 1 (74–95 mph, 119–153 km/h) Category 2 (96–110 mph, 154–177 km/h) Category 3 (111–129 mph, 178–208 km/h) Category 4 (130–156 mph, 209–251 km/h) Category 5 (≥157 mph, ≥252 km/h) Unknown Storm type Tropical cyclone Subtropical cyclone Extratropical cyclone, remnant low, tropical disturbance, or monsoon depression

On August 11, a low-level circulation center formed in conjunction with a persistent area of convection about 1,280 km (800 mi) southeast of Naha, Okinawa. Northerly upper-level winds initially provided beneficial divergence, though also resulted in detrimental wind shear and lack of inflow. Upper-level conditions gradually became more favorable for development as the disturbance tracked along the eastern periphery of an upper-level anticyclone. With convective rain bands wrapping into the circulation, the Joint Typhoon Warning Center (JTWC) issued a tropical cyclone formation alert on the system late on August 11. Remaining nearly stationary between ridges to its northeast and southwest, the system developed further, and early on August 12 the JTWC classified it as Tropical Depression 09W. Shortly thereafter, the Japan Meteorological Agency (JMA) classified it as a tropical depression while located about 1,245 km (774 mi) southeast of Okinawa.

Twelve hours later, the JTWC upgraded the tropical depression to a tropical storm based on Dvorak technique satellite intensity estimates and the storm exhibiting tightly-curved convective bands. An upper-level low helped to reduce wind shear that had been affecting the storm. The JTWC also warned of the possibility of rapid intensification. The JMA upgraded the depression to a tropical storm later that day and named it Sepat.

By early the next morning, August 13, Sepat had a banding eye visible on microwave satellite imagery and had remained in an environment conducive for strengthening, including weakening wind shear. An upper-level anticyclone also moved over the storm. By now, Sepat had moved into PAGASA's area of responsibility and attained the local name "Egay". The JMA upgraded Sepat to a severe tropical storm shortly after. Sepat continued to slowly gain more organisation and intensify further, and started to move faster under the influence of a subtropical steering ridge. Sepat strengthened into a typhoon on the morning of August 14 under still-decreasing wind shear and favourable diffluence.

Sepat developed a cloud-filled eye measuring 12 nautical miles (22 km; 14 mi) across by later that night, part of a larger central dense overcast nearly 130 nmi (240 km), 150 mi) wide. Favourable sea surface temperatures of 29–30 °C (84–86 °F) allowed Sepat to continue intensifying despite decrease of poleward outflow. By this time, Sepat had deepened to 955 hPa. The JTWC also noted possible imminent rapid intensification of the storm.

Late that night, Sepat underwent rapid intensification as expected, and was upgraded by the JTWC to a Category 4-equivalent super typhoon the next morning. The JMA analysed Sepat at 940 hPa at the same time. The deep convection warmed slightly and underwent slight fluctuations during the afternoon. During this period, Sepat slowed in forward speed and took a turn from a west-southwest motion to a more poleward one. Its eye also cleared out, became slightly larger, and warmed. By late that night, Sepat had become the strongest storm of the season to date, with the JMA analyzing its central pressure at 925 hPa, lower than Typhoon Man-yi's minimum of 935 hPa.

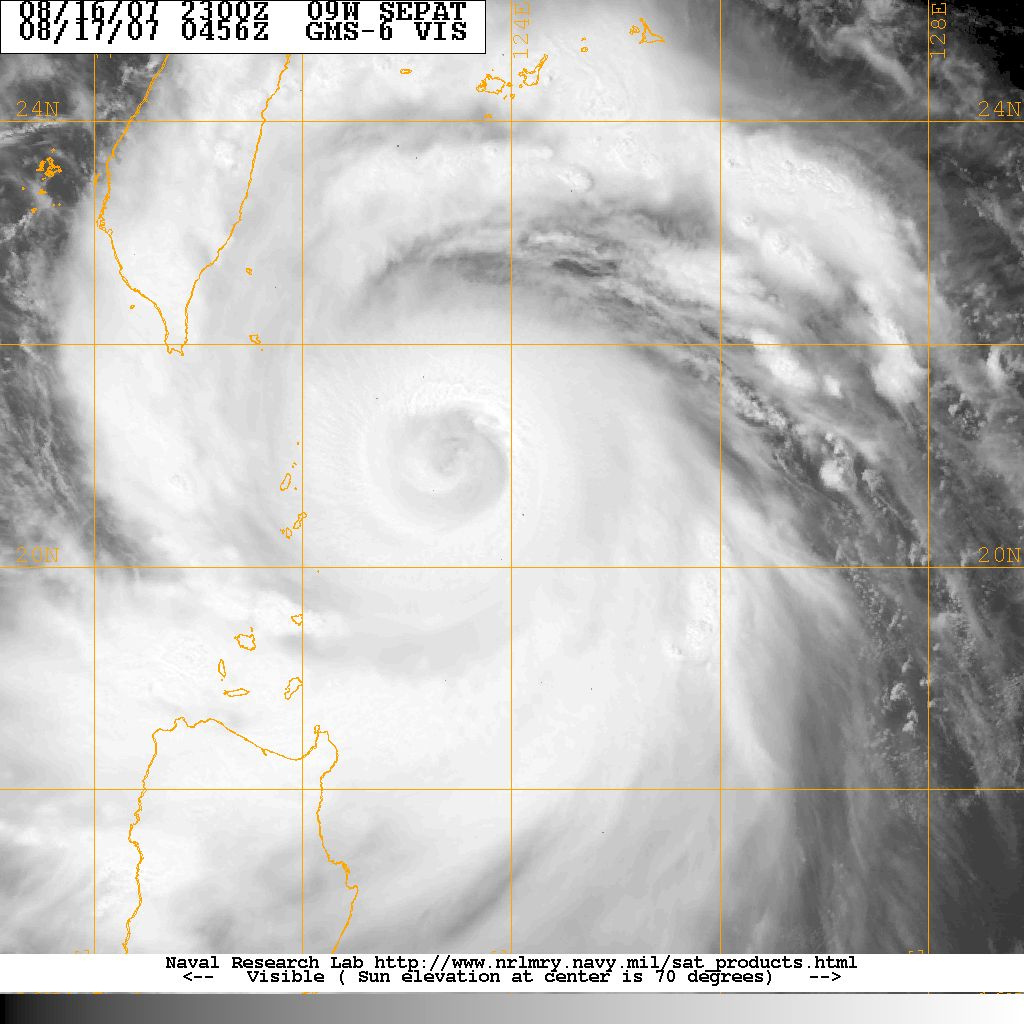
Typhoon Sepat during an eyewall replacement cycle on August 17

Continuing to intensify, Sepat reached a peak minimum central pressure of 910 hPa, as a Category 5-equivalent super typhoon, on the morning of August 16. Sepat managed to maintain its cloud-free eye. High ocean heat content and good equatorward outflow allowed Sepat to maintain its intensity, but an eyewall replacement cycle began later that night. The eyewall replacement cycle continued throughout the night, and by the next morning, Sepat displayed concentric eyewalls, with the inner eyewall being weaker. The JTWC downgraded it to a typhoon later that evening.

It made landfall in eastern Taiwan between Taitung and Hualien on the morning of August 18 local time at around 5 a.m. (2100 UTC August 17) and weakened to a minimal typhoon. After crossing the island, Sepat held on to minimal typhoon intensity before weakening to a severe tropical storm that night. It made a second landfall, in China, about 24 hours after landfall on Taiwan and was downgraded to a tropical storm the next morning. It further weakened inland, and the JMA issued its final advisory on the morning of August 20, with the storm weakening into a remnant low shortly afterward. For the next several days, Sepat's remnants drifted westward and then southwestward, before dissipating near Yunnan Province on August 24.

== Preparations ==
The Government of the Republic of China issued sea typhoon warnings on the morning of August 16 and land warnings later that evening. At all county and city levels, a typhoon holiday was declared for August 18 in preparation for the storm. In the Philippines, PAGASA issued Public Storm Warning Signals 1 to 3 (4 is the highest signal) for most provinces of Luzon.

Over 900,000 people were evacuated in eastern China, and over 100 flights had to be cancelled. In Taiwan, nearly 2,000 people had to be evacuated.

After Sepat made landfall in China, the regional meteorological office in Hunan Province sent over 2.25 million text messages to residents to warn them about the storm's remnants.

== Impact ==
=== Philippines ===
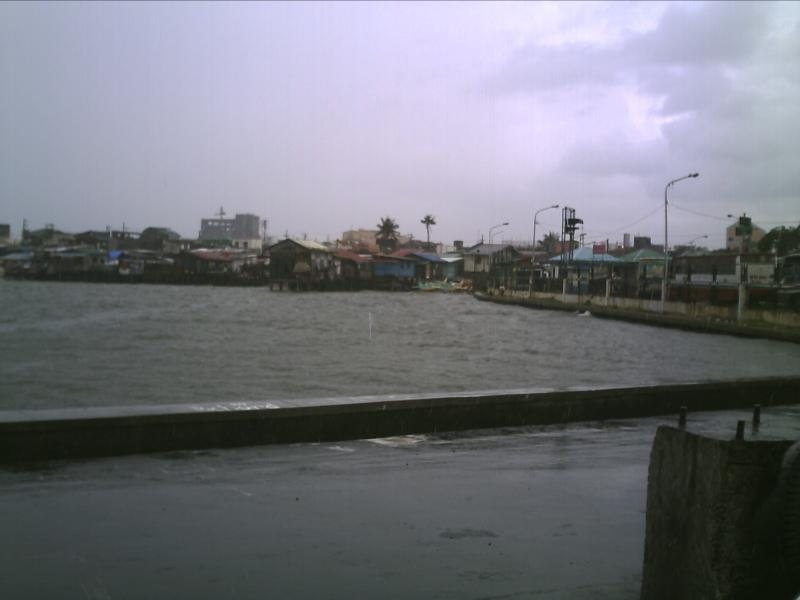
Rains in Navotas brought by Typhoon Sepat

On August 15, monsoon rains brought by Typhoon Sepat flooded and paralyzed traffic in Metro Manila. Classes and services in government offices were suspended until August 17. At least three people drowned. About 200 people were evacuated from Manila due to flooding.

=== Taiwan ===
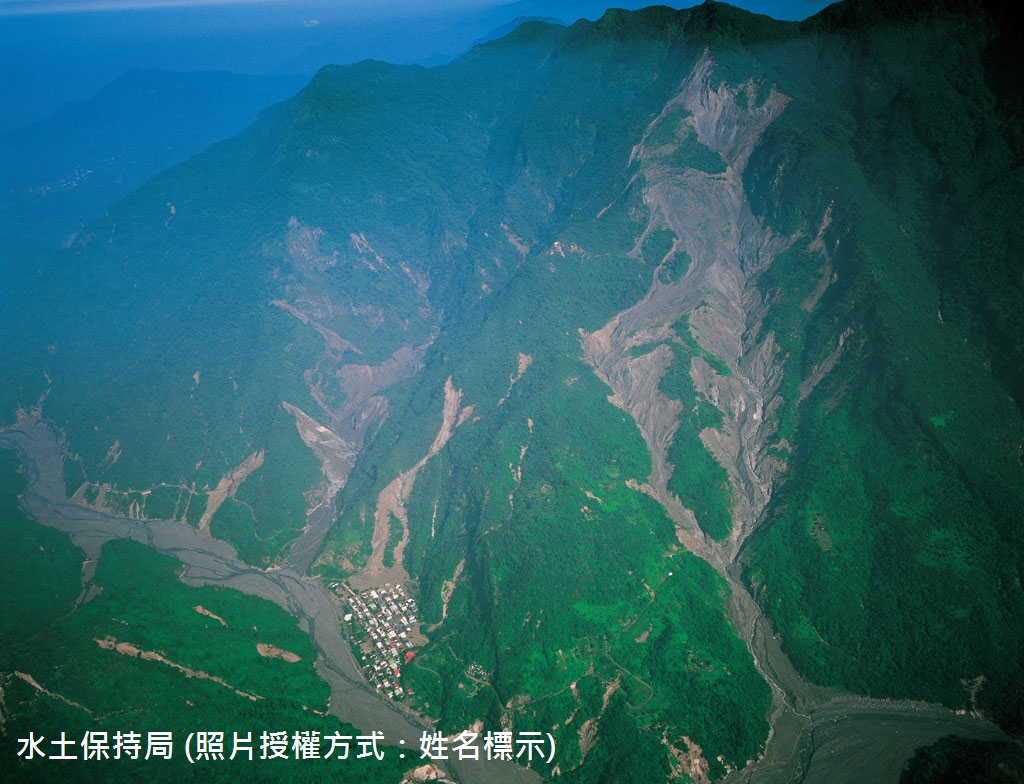
Landslides in Kucapungane caused by Typhoon Sepat

Sustained winds of 126 km/h (78 mph) were recorded off the Taiwanese coast on August 18 as Sepat moved through the country.

Heavy rainfall in Taiwan, which reached 984 mm (38.7 in) at Tianhsiang in Hualien, resulted in numerous mudslides, especially in mountain regions and in the south while the combination of the precipitation and winds caused an estimated $1.14 billion (2007 NT$, $34.5 million 2007 USD) in agricultural damage. More than 70,000 homes lost power, and nearly a week after the storm passed through 9,000 people remained without electricity.

The Suao-Hualien Highway was also closed due to landslides brought by the typhoon. One person was reported killed in Taiwan.

=== Mainland China ===
In Fujian Province, Sepat's winds felled billboards and ripped roofs off houses and two people were killed, while a tornado was reported in Zhejiang, killing 13 people and injuring at least 60 more. Most counties received almost 200 mm (7.9 in) of rainfall. Sepat caused landslides in Fujian, leaving 12 people missing. Landslides were the cause of at least half the 39 deaths in China. Damage was also reported in Jiangxi and Hunan, and damage in the four provinces was estimated at 5 billion yuan (US$658 million).

== See also ==
- Typhoon Kalmaegi (2008)
- Typhoon Matmo (2014)
- Typhoon Chan-hom (2015)
- Typhoon Nepartak (2016)
