= 2016 Atlantic hurricane season =

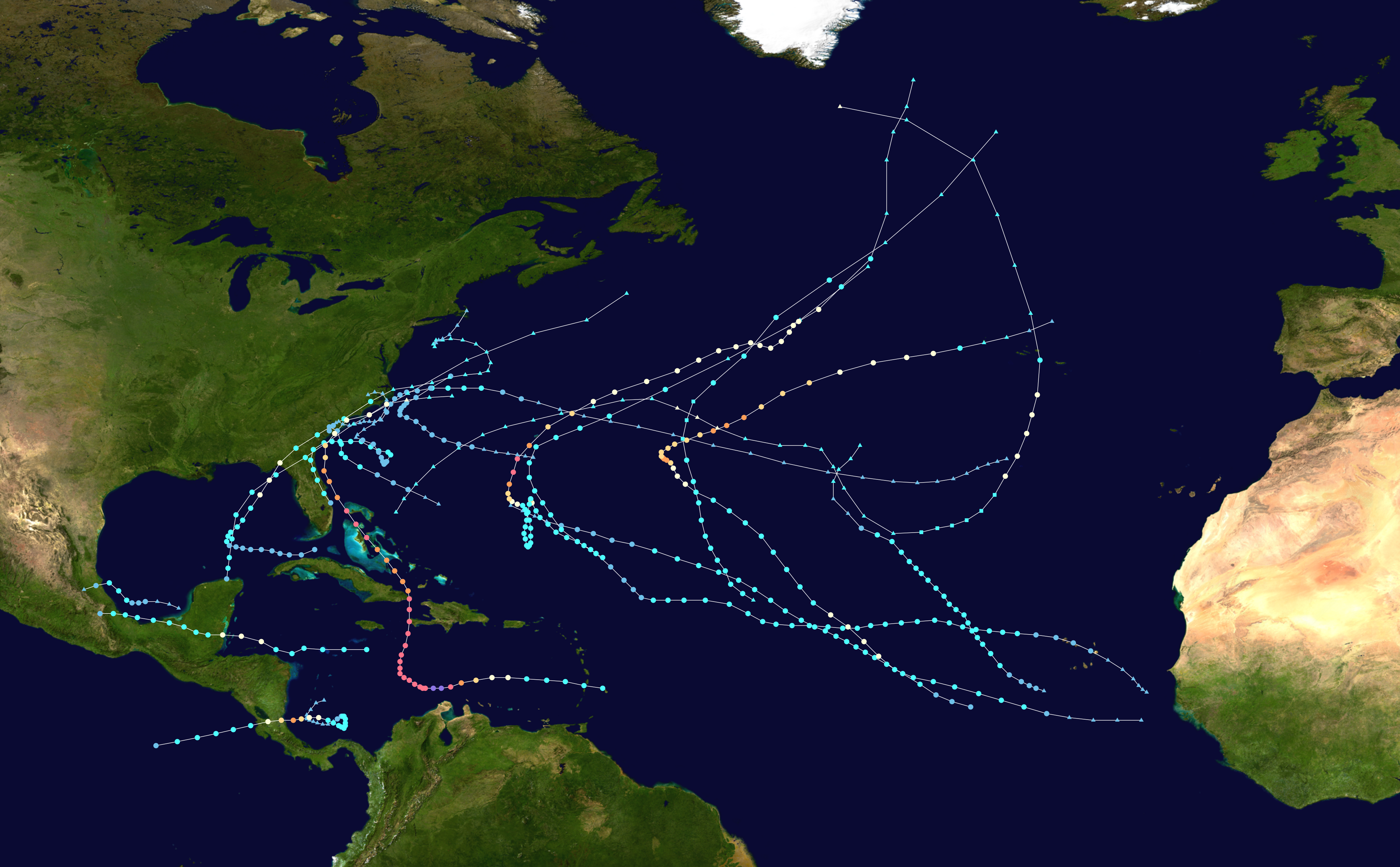
- Season summary map

Seasonal boundaries
- First system formed: January 12, 2016
- Last system dissipated: November 25, 2016 (Note: The last storm, Otto, exited into the eastern Pacific on this day, dissipating in that basin a day later.)

Strongest storm
- Name: Matthew
  - Maximum winds: 165 mph (270 km/h) (1-minute sustained)
  - Lowest pressure: 934 mbar (hPa; 27.58 inHg)

Seasonal statistics
- Total depressions: 16
- Total storms: 15
- Hurricanes: 7
- Major hurricanes (Cat. 3+): 4
- ACE: 142.5
- Total fatalities: 864 total
- Total damage: ≥ $17.5 billion (2016 USD)

Related articles
- Timeline of the 2016 Atlantic hurricane season; 2016 Pacific hurricane season; 2016 Pacific typhoon season; 2016 North Indian Ocean cyclone season

The 2016 Atlantic hurricane season was the first above-average hurricane season since 2012, producing 15 named storms, 7 hurricanes and 4 major hurricanes. The season officially started on June 1 and ended on November 30, though the first storm, Hurricane Alex which formed in the Northeastern Atlantic, developed on January 12, being the first hurricane to develop in January since 1938. The final storm, Otto, crossed into the Eastern Pacific on November 25, a few days before the official end. Following Alex, Tropical Storm Bonnie brought flooding to South Carolina and portions of North Carolina. Tropical Storm Colin in early June brought minor flooding and wind damage to parts of the Southeastern United States, especially Florida. Hurricane Earl left 94 fatalities in the Dominican Republic and Mexico, 81 of which occurred in the latter. In early September, Hurricane Hermine, the first hurricane to make landfall in Florida since Hurricane Wilma in 2005, brought extensive coastal flooding damage especially to the Forgotten and Nature coasts of Florida. Hermine was responsible for five fatalities and about $550 million (2016 USD) in damage. (Note: All damage figures are in 2016 USD, unless otherwise noted)

The strongest, costliest, and deadliest storm of the season was Hurricane Matthew, the southernmost Category 5 Atlantic hurricane on record and the first to reach that intensity since Felix in 2007, ending the longest streak of seasons without a hurricane of such intensity in the satellite era. With at least 603 deaths attributed to it, Matthew was the deadliest Atlantic hurricane since Stan of 2005. Furthermore, damage from Matthew is estimated to be at least $16.5 billion, making it the ninth costliest Atlantic hurricane on record at the time. Hurricane Nicole became the first major hurricane to directly impact Bermuda since Hurricane Fabian in 2003, leaving widespread but relatively moderate damage on the island. The final tropical cyclone of the season – Hurricane Otto – brought severe flooding to Central America in November, particularly in Costa Rica and Nicaragua. Otto left 23 deaths and about $190 million in damage. On November 25, the storm emerged into the Eastern Pacific basin, the first such occurrence since Hurricane Cesar–Douglas in 1996. Most of the season's tropical cyclones impacted land, and nine of those storms caused loss of life. Collectively, the storms left at least 736 fatalities and $17.49 billion in damage, making the season the costliest since 2012.

Most forecasting groups predicted above average activity in anticipation of a dissipating El Niño event and the development of a La Niña, as well as warmer than normal sea surface temperatures. Overall, the forecasts were fairly accurate.

== Seasonal forecasts ==
Predictions of tropical activity in the 2016 season
Source	Date	Named storms	Hurricanes	Major hurricanes
Average (1981–2010)		12.1	6.4	2.7
Record high activity		30	15	7†
Record low activity		1	0†	0†
TSR	December 16, 2015	13	5	2
TSR	April 5, 2016	12	6	2
CSU	April 14, 2016	13	6	2
CCU	April 15, 2016	13	7	4
NCSU	April 15, 2016	15–18	8–11	3–5
UKMO	May 12, 2016	14*	8*	N/A
NOAA	May 27, 2016	10–16	4–8	1–4
TSR	May 27, 2016	17	9	4
CSU	June 1, 2016	14	6	2
CSU	July 1, 2016	15	6	2
TSR	July 5, 2016	16	8	3
CSU	August 4, 2016	15	6	2
TSR	August 5, 2016	15	7	3
NOAA	August 11, 2016	12–17	5–8	2–4
	Actual activity	15	7	4
* June–November only. † Most recent of several such occurrences. (See all)

Ahead of and during the season, several meteorological services and scientific agencies forecast how many named storms, hurricanes, and major hurricanes will form during a season, and/or how many tropical cyclones will affect a particular country. These agencies include the Tropical Storm Risk (TSR) Consortium of the University College London, the National Oceanic and Atmospheric Administration (NOAA), United Kingdom Met Office (UKMO), Coastal Carolina University (CCU), Colorado State University (CSU), and North Carolina State University (NCSU). The forecasts include weekly and monthly changes in significant factors that help determine the number of tropical storms, hurricanes, and major hurricanes within a particular year. Some of these forecasts also take into consideration what happened in previous seasons and the predicted weakening of the 2014–2016 El Niño event. On average, an Atlantic hurricane season between 1981 and 2010 contained twelve tropical storms, six hurricanes, and two major hurricanes, with an accumulated cyclone energy (ACE) index of between 66 and 103 units. Broadly speaking, ACE is a measure of the power of a tropical or subtropical storm multiplied by the length of time it existed. Therefore, a storm with a longer duration or stronger intensity will have high values of ACE. It is only calculated for full advisories on specific tropical systems reaching or exceeding wind speeds of 39 mph (63 km/h). Accordingly, tropical depressions are not included here. After the storm has dissipated, typically after the end of the season, the NHC reexamines the data, and produces a final report on each storm. These revisions can lead to a revised ACE total either upward or downward compared to the operational value.

=== Pre-season forecasts ===
The first forecast for the year was issued by CSU on December 11, who anticipated that one of four different scenarios could occur. The scenario considered most likely was that Atlantic multidecadal oscillation (AMO) and thermohaline circulation (THC) would be stronger, but effects from El Niño would remain, resulting in a slightly above average season. The next most likely scenario was that both the AMO and THC would strengthen and the El Niño effects would cease to exist, causing a well above average season. In the other two scenarios, which were given the same probability of occurrence, the AMO and THC would weaken and the effects of El Niño would either disappear or some would remain, resulting in either a near average or well below average season.

TSR subsequently issued their first outlook for the 2016 season during December 16, 2015 and predicted that activity would be about 20% below the 1950–2015 average, or about 15% below the 2005–2015 average. Specifically they thought that there would be 13 tropical storms, 5 hurricanes, 2 major hurricanes and an ACE index of 79 units. A few months later, TSR issued their second prediction for the season during April 6, 2016 and lowered the predicted number of named storms to 12 but raised the number of hurricanes to 6. On April 14, CSU predicted that the season would be near-normal, predicting 13 named storms, 6 hurricanes and 2 major hurricanes with ACE near 93. On April 15, NCSU predicted the season would be very active, with 15–18 named storms, 8–11 hurricanes and 3–5 major hurricanes. A month later, the UKMO released its forecast, predicting a slightly above-average season with 14 named storms and 8 hurricanes. It also predicted an ACE index of 125, above the defined average ACE index at 103.

On May 27, NOAA issued its first outlook calling for a near-normal season with a 70% chance that 10–16 named storms could form, including 4–8 hurricanes of which 1–4 could reach major hurricane status. NOAA also stated that there is a 45% chance of a near-normal season, 30% chance of an above-normal season and 25% chance of a below-normal season. Also on May 27, TSR substantially increased their forecast numbers, predicting activity would be about 30% above the average with 17 named storms, 9 hurricanes, 4 major hurricanes and an ACE near 130. The reason for the increased activity forecast was the increased likelihood of La Niña forming during the season in addition to a trend towards a negative North Atlantic Oscillation, which generally favors a warmer tropical Atlantic. TSR predicted that there is a 57% chance that the 2016 Atlantic season would be above-normal, a 33% chance it would be near-normal, and only a 10% chance it would be below-normal.

=== Mid-season outlooks ===
CSU updated their forecast on June 1 to include 14 named storms, 6 hurricanes and 2 major hurricanes to include Tropical Storm Bonnie. It was again updated on July 1 to include 15 named storms, 6 hurricanes and 2 major hurricanes, to accommodate for tropical storms Colin and Danielle. On July 5, TSR released their fourth forecast for the season, slightly lowering the predicted numbers to 16 tropical storms, 8 hurricanes and 3 major hurricanes. On August 5, TSR released their final forecast for the season, lowering the numbers to 15 named storms and 7 hurricanes due to the influence of La Niña being less than anticipated previously. NOAA updated their forecast on August 11, increasing their predictions to 12–17 named storms, 5–8 hurricanes, and 2–4 major hurricanes.

== Seasonal summary ==
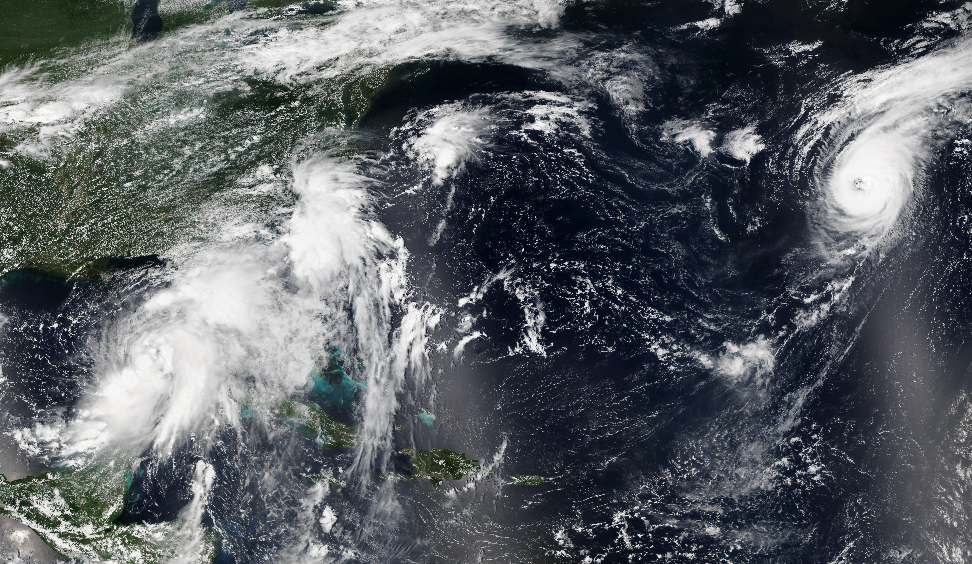
Three tropical cyclones active in the Atlantic basin on August 31. From left to right: Hermine (left), TD Eight (northeast of Hermine, middle), and Gaston (right)

The 2016 Atlantic hurricane season officially began on June 1, 2016. It was an above average season and the most active since 2012, producing a total of 15 named storms, 7 hurricanes, and 4 major hurricanes. The first storm, Hurricane Alex, developed on January 12, while the final system, Hurricane Otto, made a crossover to the Eastern Pacific on November 25. The higher-than-normal activity was attributed to many factors. Most significantly, one of the strongest El Niño events recorded in history rapidly dissipated, transforming to cool-neutral conditions across the Pacific in late summer. This led to warmer than normal sea surface temperatures across the Atlantic, though the subtropical regions were slightly cooler than normal; slightly lower than normal sea level pressures; and reduced wind shear, especially in the Caribbean, which had experienced record values of wind shear in the past recent years. Moisture levels, however, were anomalously dry, which likely prevented some of the storms from becoming significant hurricanes. Steering currents had also been different from past years, which had previously had a trough of low pressure dominating the East Coast of the United States. The tropical cyclones of this season caused about $16.1 billion in damage and at least 748 deaths, being the costliest season since 2012, the deadliest since 2008. The Atlantic hurricane season officially ended on November 30, 2016.

The year opened up with an anomalous storm in January: Hurricane Alex, the first system of such intensity to develop in January since 1938. Activity picked up at the end of May into June, with three consecutive tropical storms: Bonnie, Colin, and Danielle. The latter two became the earliest third- and fourth-named storms on record respectively. July saw no storm development for the first time in four years, however. August saw the formation of five tropical cyclones, including Earl, Fiona, Gaston, Eight, and Hermine. A Category 1 hurricane, Earl wrought tremendous damage in Belize and Mexico. With 81 lives lost in Mexico during the passage of Earl, it was the deadliest Atlantic hurricane in the country since 2005. Gaston became the season's first major hurricane on August 28, attaining peak winds of 120 mph (195 km/h) over the central Atlantic. On September 1, Hermine struck the Florida Peninsula as a Category 1 hurricane, ending an 11-year drought of hurricane landfalls in the state, which began after Hurricane Wilma in October 2005.

September featured another five tropical cyclones: Ian, Julia, Karl, Lisa, and Matthew, the latter of which persisted into October. Matthew proved to be the most significant storm of the season, becoming the first Category 5 hurricane in the Atlantic since Hurricane Felix in 2007, and, with a death toll of over 700, it was the deadliest in the Atlantic basin since Hurricane Stan in 2005. It subsequently struck Haiti as a Category 4 hurricane, and inflicted catastrophic damage across the impoverished nation. Matthew also caused extensive damage in Cuba, the Bahamas, and the Southeastern United States. Concurrently, Hurricane Nicole meandered south of Bermuda for more than a week before making a direct hit on the territory as a major hurricane. The next four weeks were quiet, until Hurricane Otto formed in the southwestern Caribbean during late November. Otto eventually became the latest-forming major hurricane in the Atlantic basin on record, surpassing a storm in 1934. After striking Nicaragua and becoming the first hurricane on record to pass over Costa Rica, Otto – the final tropical cyclone of the season – then emerged into the Eastern Pacific basin on November 25, the first such occurrence since Hurricane Cesar–Douglas in 1996.

The season's activity was reflected with an accumulated cyclone energy index of 142.5 units, which was well above the 1981–2010 median of 92, as well as the highest value since 2010.

== Systems ==
=== Hurricane Alex ===
- Category 1 hurricane (SSHWS)
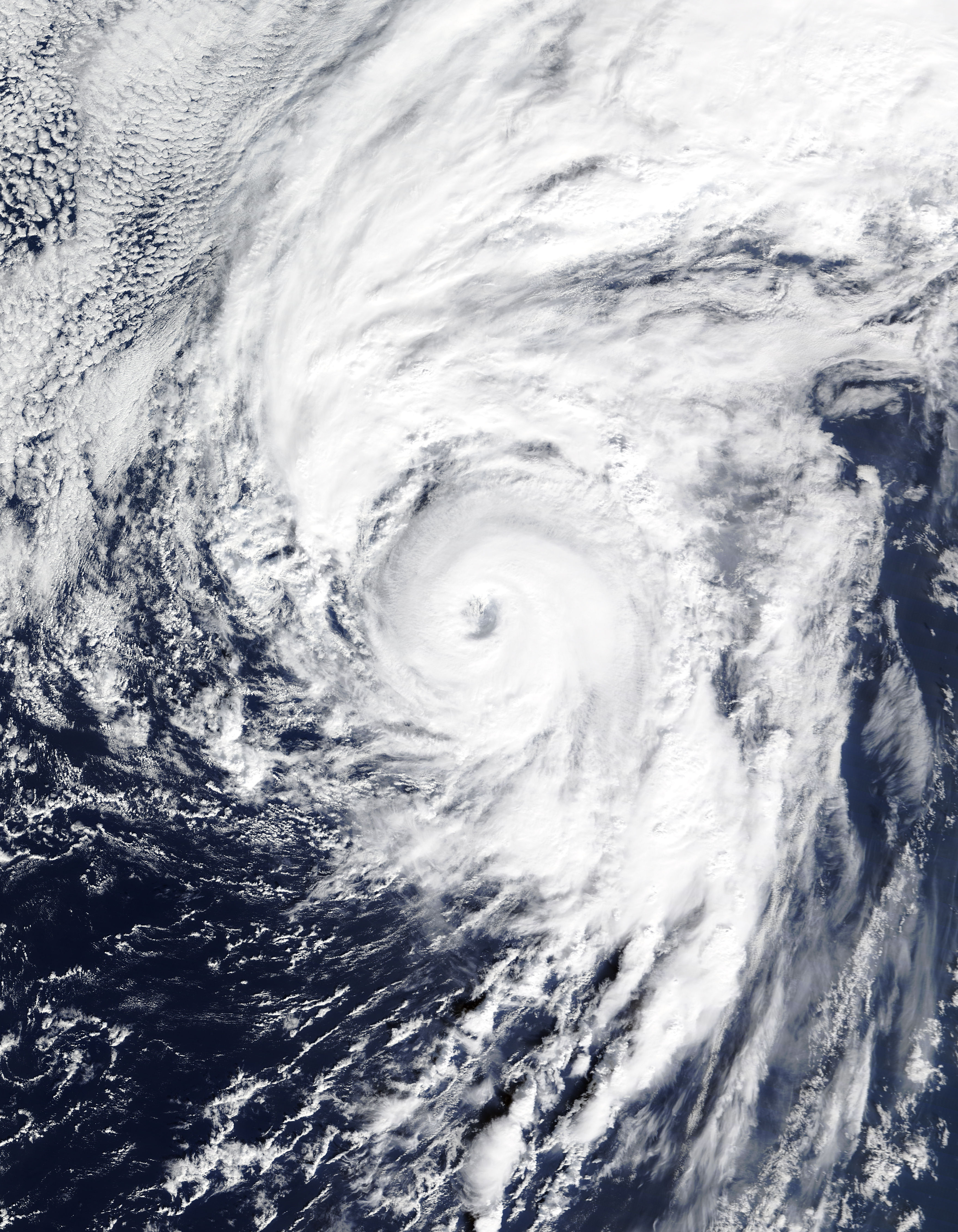
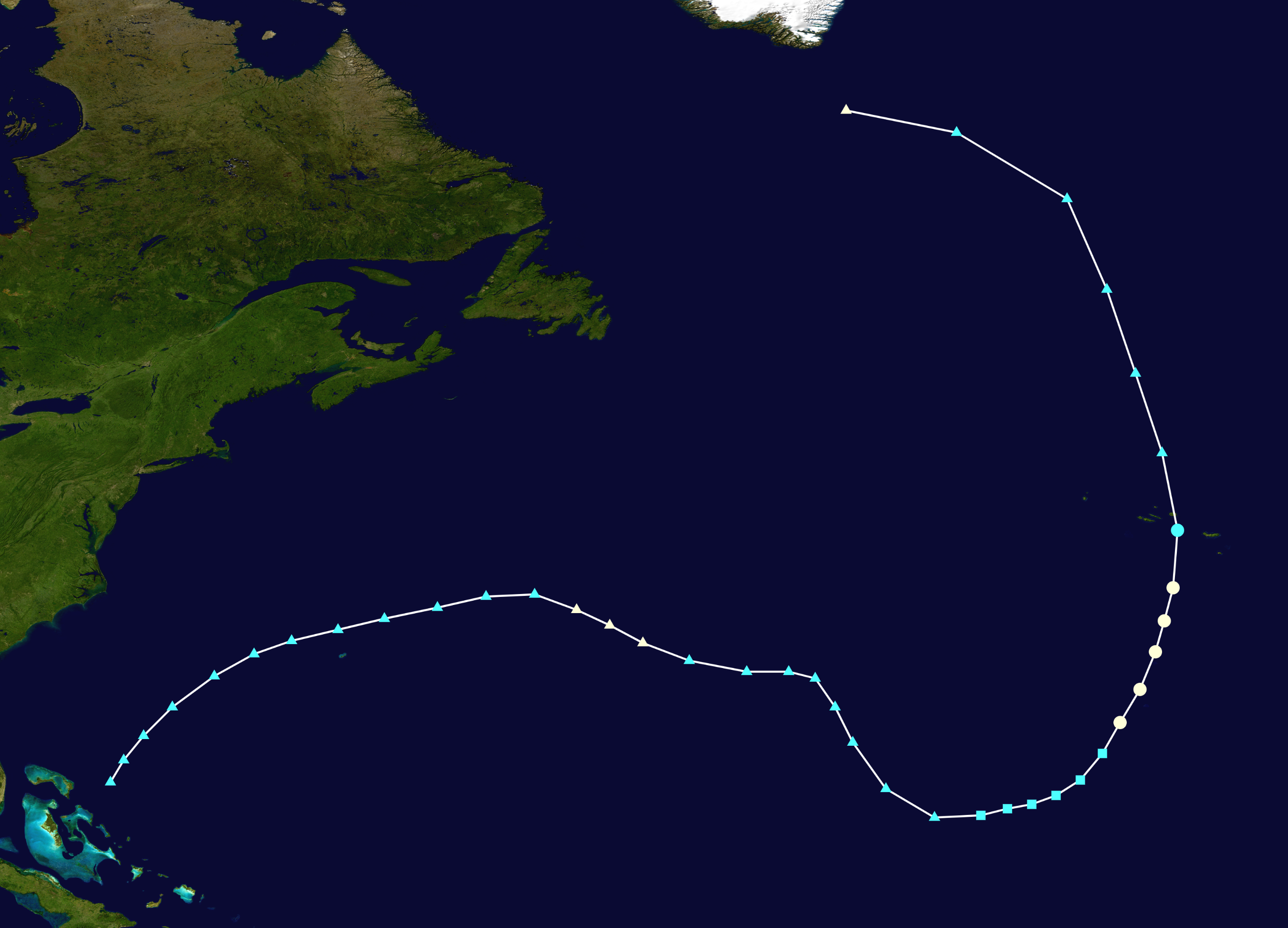
- Duration: January 12 – January 15
- Peak intensity: 85 mph (140 km/h) (1-min); 981 mbar (hPa)

A weak area of low pressure developed over northwestern Cuba in association with a stationary front on January 6. The frontal wave intensified as it moved into the central Atlantic, temporarily attaining hurricane-force winds by January 10. Steered by anomalous high pressure, the disturbance turned southeast and tracked over warmer waters. Its associated fronts dissipated, its wind field became more symmetric, and convection increased near the center, leading to the formation of Subtropical Storm Alex by 18:00 UTC on January 12. Despite marginal ocean temperatures, Alex benefited from rapidly cooling upper-air temperatures, and it intensified quickly while turning northeast. The presence of deeper convection near the center and an eye on conventional satellite showcased the storm's transition into a fully tropical cyclone and intensification into a hurricane by 06:00 UTC on January 14. Six hours later, it peaked with maximum sustained winds of 85 mph (135 km/h). Alex turned north after peak, and the storm weakened to a tropical storm before making landfall on Terceira Island, Azores. With decreasing core convection and an impinging warm front, Alex transitioned into an extratropical cyclone by 18:00 UTC on January 15 and was absorbed by a larger extratropical low two days later.

The precursor disturbance to Hurricane Alex produced gusts up to 60 mph (95 km/h) on Bermuda, as well as swells up to 20 ft (6 m) offshore; this disrupted air travel, downed trees, caused sporadic power outages, and suspended ferry services. In the Azores, the cyclone produced maximum rainfall accumulations up to 4.04 in (103 mm) in Lagoa. Peak gusts of 57 mph (92 km/h) affected Ponta Delgada, causing minor to moderate damage. Landslides also contributed to minor damage. One death occurred when a victim that suffered a heart attack was unable to be airlifted to a hospital due to unsettled conditions.

=== Tropical Storm Bonnie ===
- Tropical storm (SSHWS)
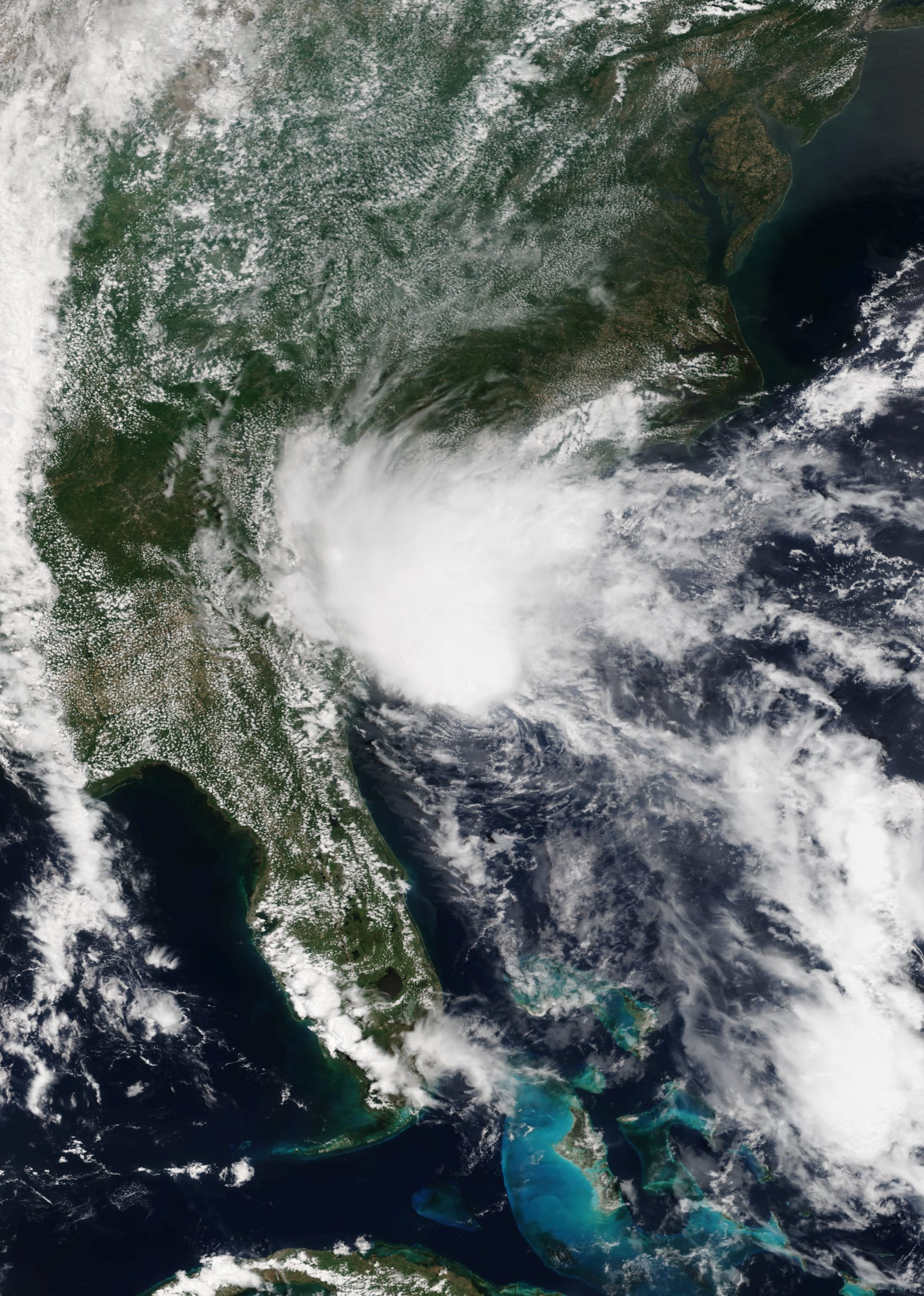
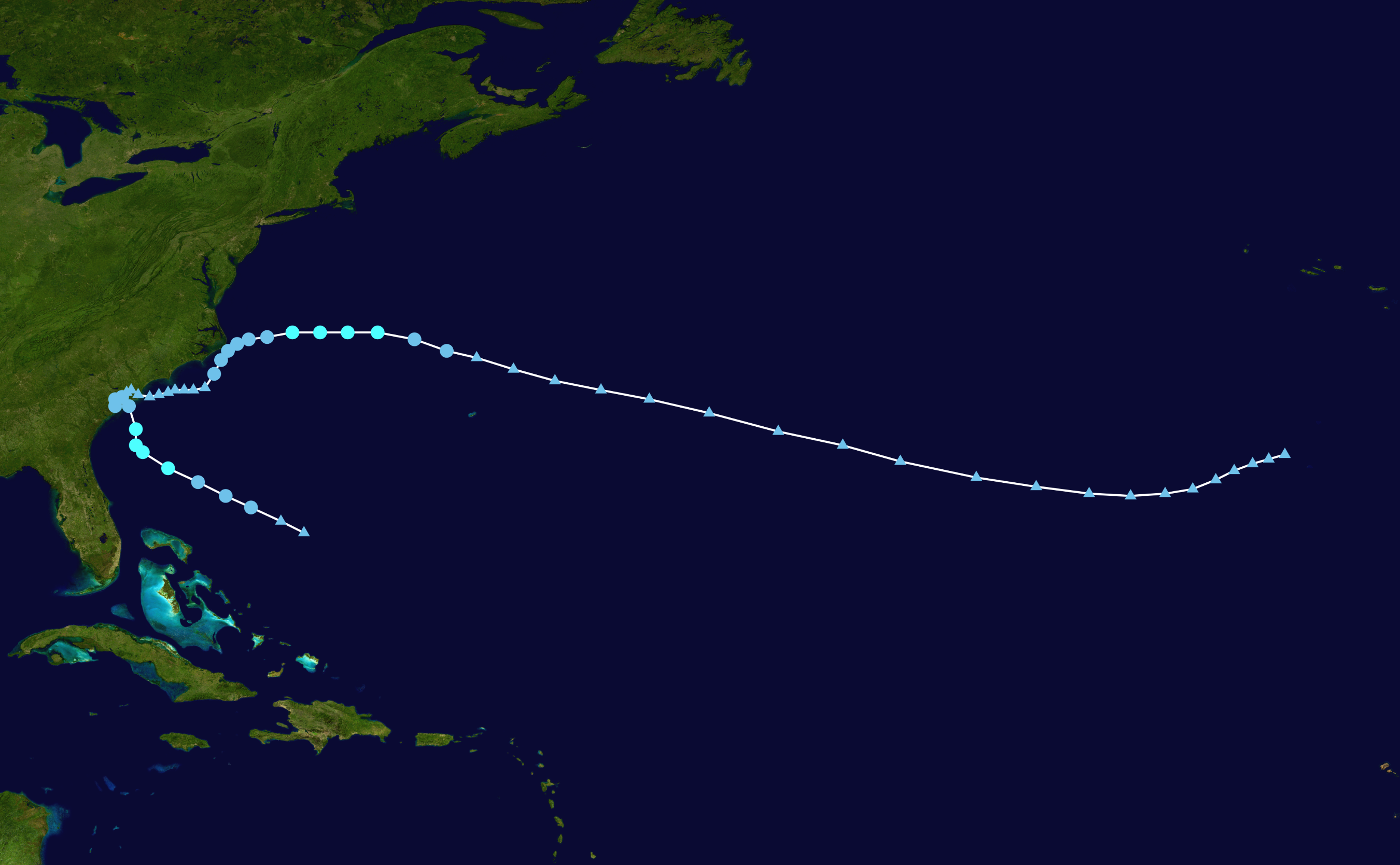
- Duration: May 27 – June 4
- Peak intensity: 45 mph (75 km/h) (1-min); 1006 mbar (hPa)

An area of low pressure developed into Tropical Depression Two at 18:00 UTC on May 27, while situated about 205 mi (330 km) northeast of Great Abaco in the Bahamas. Moving steadily west-northwestwards, Bonnie intensified into a tropical storm on May 28. Shortly thereafter, the storm reached its peak winds of 45 mph (70 km/h). However, due to hostile environmental conditions, Bonnie weakened to a depression hours before making landfall just east of Isle of Palms, South Carolina, on May 29. Steering currents collapsed afterwards, causing the storm to meander over South Carolina for two days. The storm weakened further into a non-tropical remnant low on May 31, before emerging off the coast while moving generally east-northeastwards. On June 2, Bonnie regenerated into a tropical depression just offshore North Carolina as conditions became slightly more favorable. The next day, despite increasing wind shear and cooling sea surface temperatures, Bonnie reintensified into a tropical storm and reached its minimum barometric pressure of 1,006 mbar (29.7 inHg). The storm weakened to a tropical depression late on June 4 and became a non-tropical low again early the next day to the north of Bermuda. The remnants moved east-southeast until dissipating on June 9.

Rip currents along the coastline of the Southeast United States led to dozens of water rescues; the body of one 20-year-old man was recovered in Brevard County, Florida, after he drowned, Lingering over South Carolina for a few days, Bonnie brought heavy rains and widespread floods to the Southeastern United States. Rainfall totals hit 6 in (150 mm) in much of South Carolina, and exceeded 10 in (250 mm) in some areas. Flooding resulted in the closure of the southbound lanes of Interstate 95 in Jasper County, and also inundated the Jasper County Sheriff's Office and Detention Center. In Ridgeland, several buildings were damaged and the local wastewater treatment plant overflowed, spilling discharge into the nearby Captain Bill Creek. Damage in this county alone exceeded $640,000. Record-breaking rainfall was observed across much of the Outer Banks; on Hatteras Island, Cape Point Campground was closed for a week due to flooding. In North Carolina, the body of a 21-year-old man was recovered in New Hanover County, several days after he went missing in rough surf.

=== Tropical Storm Colin ===
- Tropical storm (SSHWS)
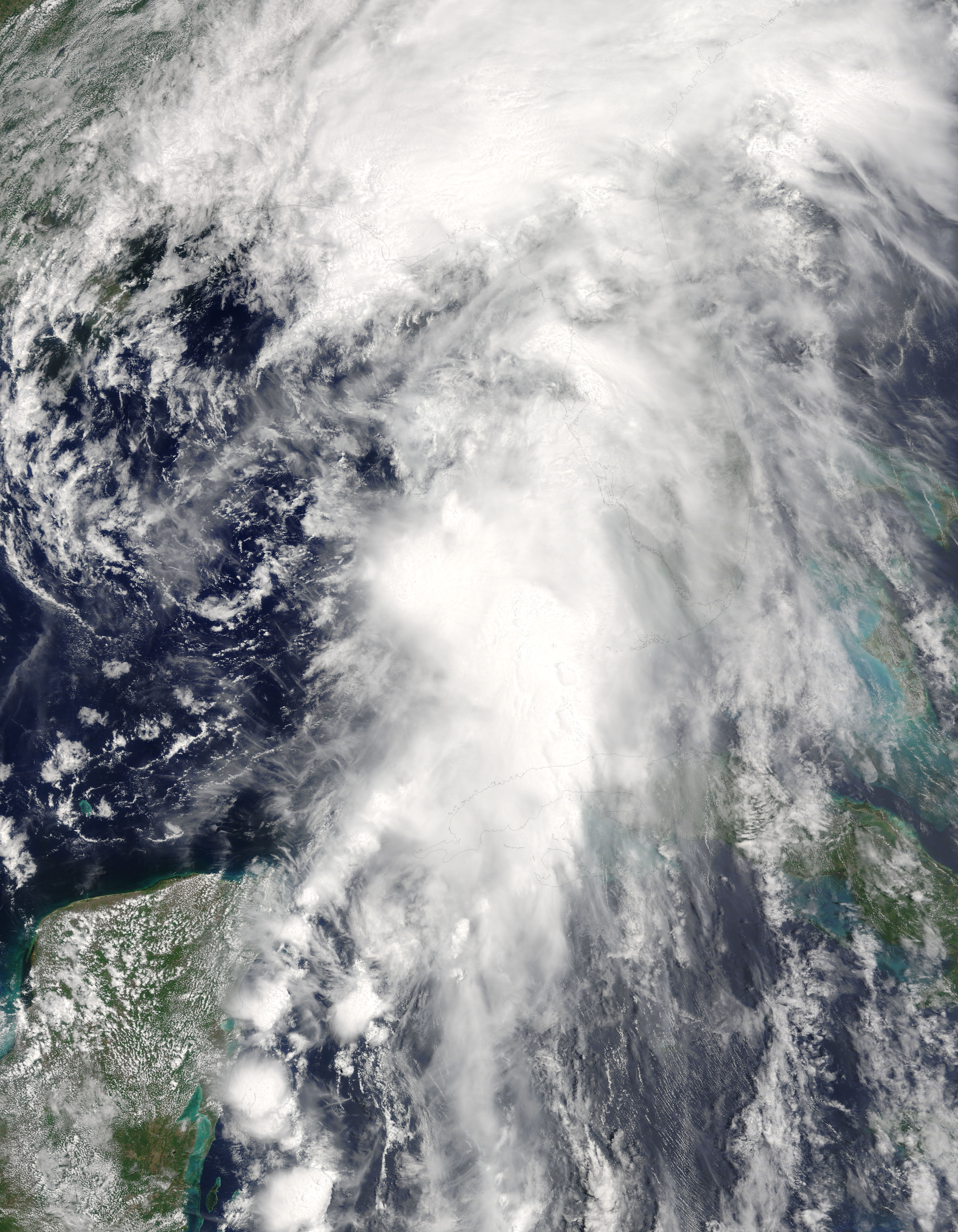
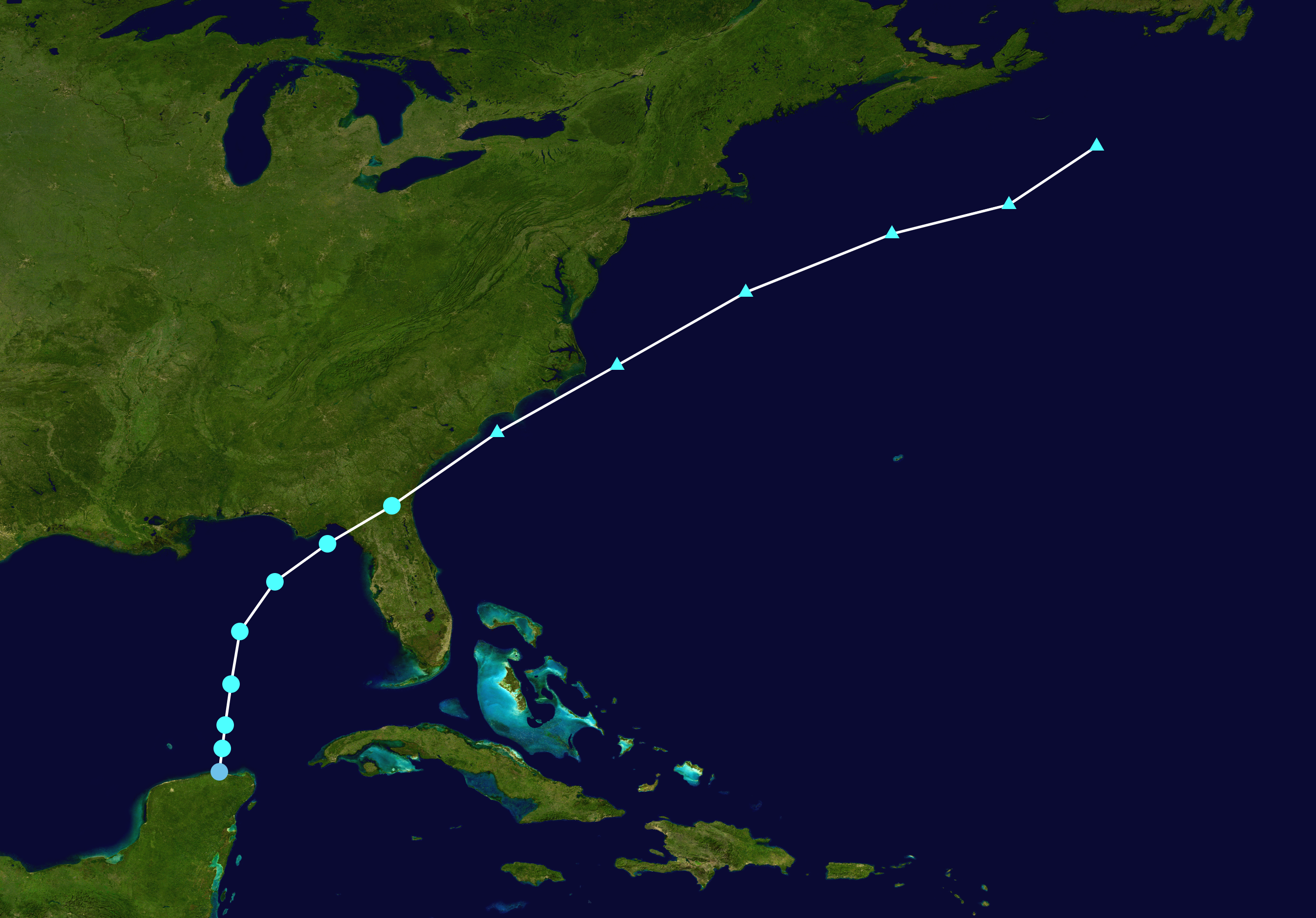
- Duration: June 5 – June 7
- Peak intensity: 50 mph (85 km/h) (1-min); 1001 mbar (hPa)

On May 27, a tropical wave exited the coast of Africa. By early June, the wave entered the Caribbean and spawned a low-pressure system. The low remained disorganized with only isolated convection, mostly in the eastern quadrant. Convection began to wrap into the center as the storm curved northward into the Gulf of Mexico on June 3. After the low passed over the Yucatán Peninsula on June 5, the National Hurricane Center (NHC) upgraded it to Tropical Depression Three. Later that day, the depression intensified into Tropical Storm Colin. Gradually curving northeastwards, Colin remained disorganized as it accelerated towards the coast of Florida on June 6. The NHC noted that there was uncertainty in locating the circulation center, instead taking the midpoint between two small-scale circulations. However, the NHC increased the winds to 50 mph (80 km/h) following a strong burst in Colin's convection. Colin continued accelerating to the northeast and made landfall near Keaton Beach, Florida, at 02:00 UTC on June 7. Failing to weaken over land, Colin began undergoing extratropical transition after the increasingly ill-defined circulation moved off the coast of Georgia, and became fully extratropical hours later.

In Cuba, heavy rainfall resulted in flooding in the western portions of the island, especially Pinar del Río Province. Water left several roads impassable and inundated crops in some areas; about 840,000 acres (340,000 ha) of crops were flooded overall. In Old Havana, mudslides severely damaged three homes and impacted numerous others to a lesser degree. The storm also produced heavy rainfall over portions of Florida, resulting in flooding in some areas, especially Hillsborough and Pinellas counties. There, the freshwater flooding was compounded by coastal flooding from high tides. Winds caused over 93,300 power outages throughout the state. The storm spawned at least one tornado, which knocked down trees and damaged several cars and homes in Jacksonville. Four fatalities occurred in the Florida Panhandle due to drowning. Heavy rainfall was also observed in portions of Georgia, North Carolina, and South Carolina. Two additional drowning deaths occurred in Georgia and one in Alabama. Damage throughout the East Coast reached $1.04 million.

=== Tropical Storm Danielle ===
- Tropical storm (SSHWS)
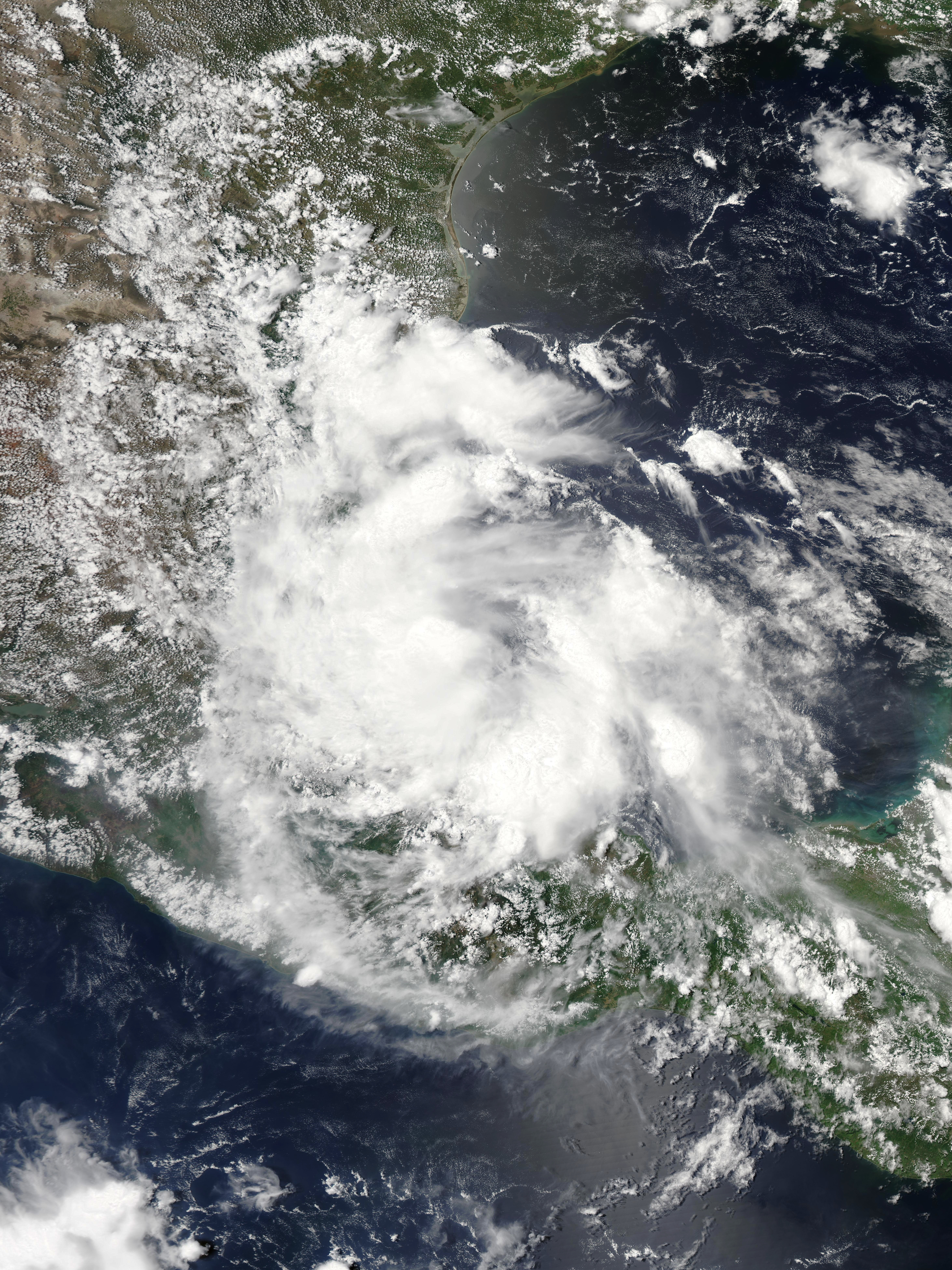
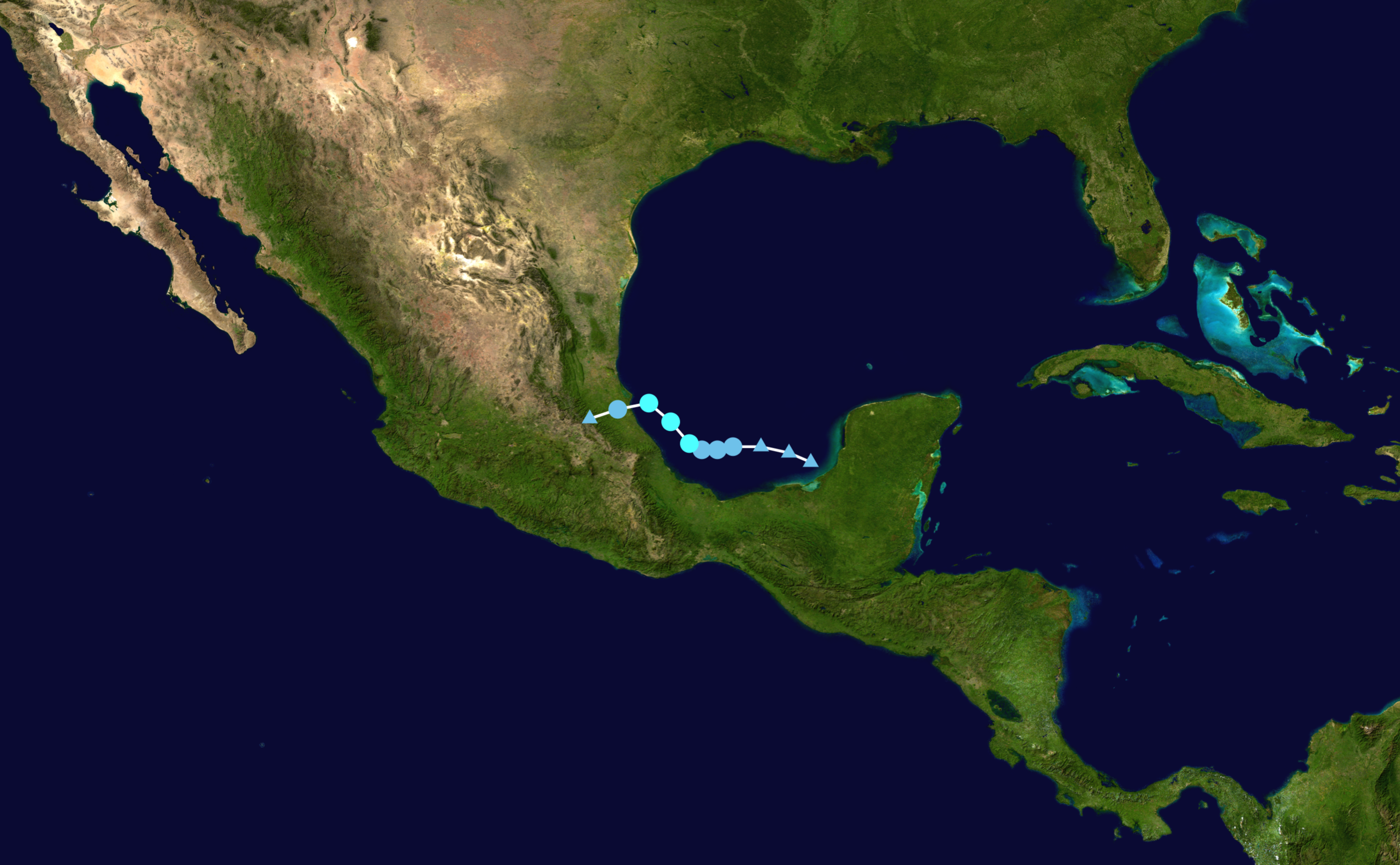
- Duration: June 19 – June 21
- Peak intensity: 45 mph (75 km/h) (1-min); 1007 mbar (hPa)

A tropical wave emerged off the western coast of Africa on June 8, reaching the southwestern Caribbean Sea by June 15. Convection increased that day, and further organized after the system entered the Bay of Campeche three days later, subsequently leading to the formation of a tropical depression by 12:00 UTC on June 19. Steered west-northwest and then northwest by a mid-level ridge, the depression intensified into Tropical Storm Danielle by 06:00 UTC on June 20 and attained peak winds of 45 mph (70 km/h) six hours later. Interaction with land began to weaken the storm a few hours later, and Danielle made landfall near Tamiahua, Mexico with winds of 40 mph (65 km/h). The storm rapidly weakened as it moved inland, falling to tropical depression intensity by 00:00 UTC on June 21 and degenerating into a remnant low six hours later. The remnant low continued inland before dissipating over the mountains of eastern Mexico that same day.

A tropical storm warning was issued along the coast of Mexico from Laguna Verde to Rio Paranuco. It was later discontinued when Danielle moved ashore and rapidly weakened. Danielle dropped heavy rainfall across the affected regions, particularly the areas near Veracruz and Tamiahua. Official amounts were not reported, however the maximum rainfall that was observed was around 6.22 in (158 mm) at Cosautlán de Carvajal. The cyclone also brought wind gusts up to 45 mph (72 km/h), reported near Tampico. Across much of Veracruz, officials suspended school activities and the port of Veracruz was temporarily closed. Flooding in the Pueblo Viejo Municipality affected 1,200 families and prompted activation of public shelters. A homeless man drowned in a storm drain in Ciudad Madero, Tamaulipas, after flash flooding impacted the area.

=== Hurricane Earl ===
- Category 1 hurricane (SSHWS)
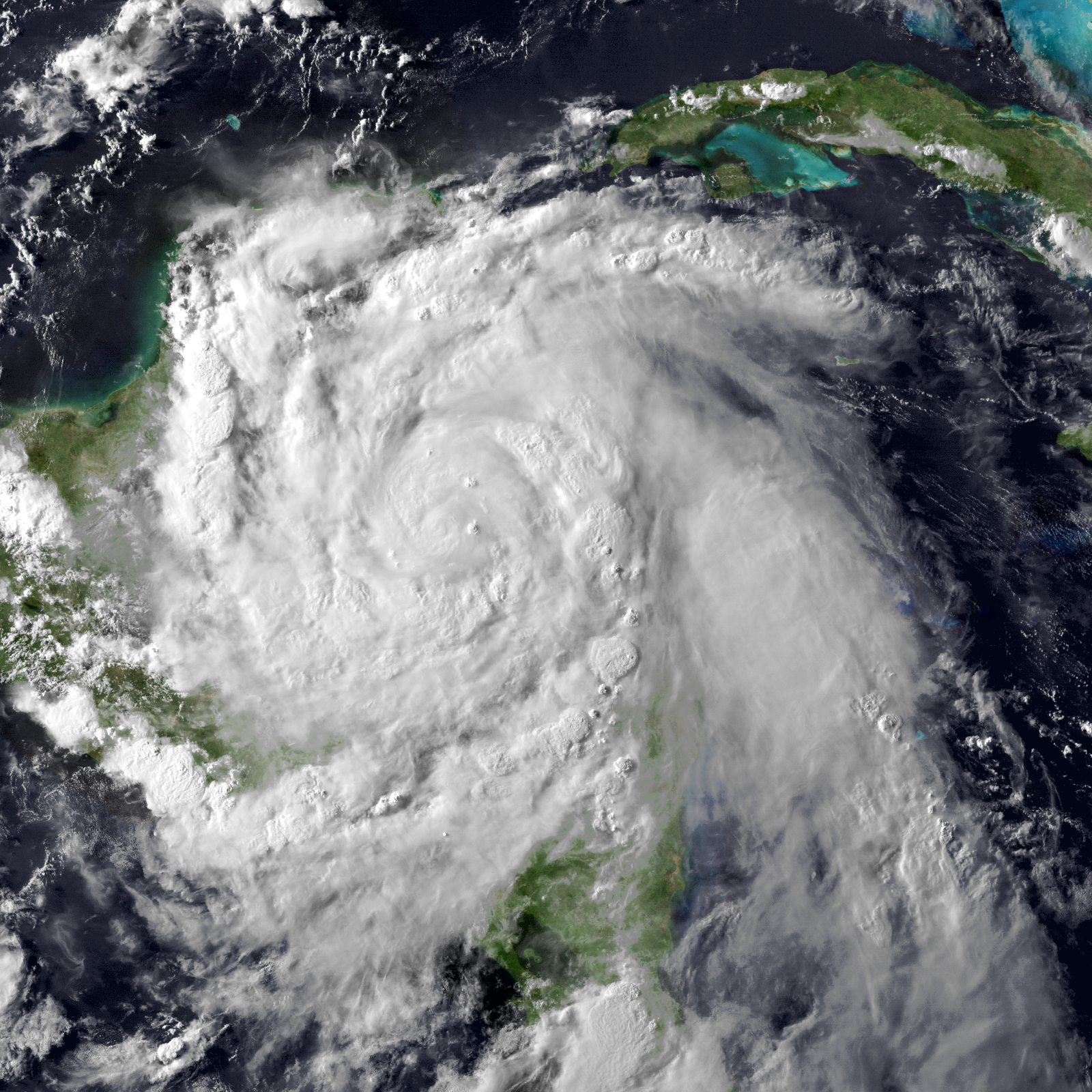
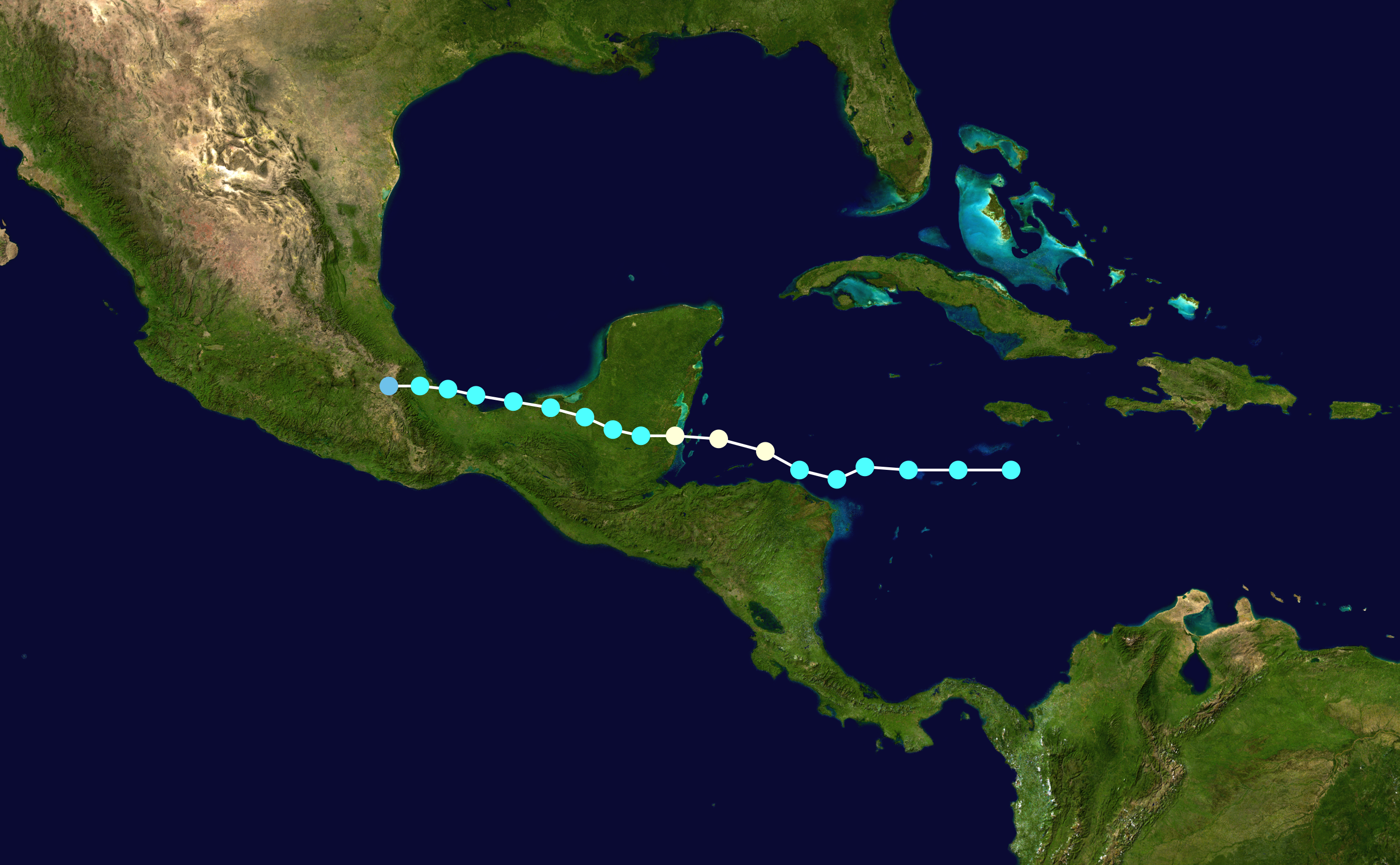
- Duration: August 2 – August 6
- Peak intensity: 85 mph (140 km/h) (1-min); 979 mbar (hPa)

On July 26, a tropical wave emerged into the Atlantic from the west coast of Africa. The disturbance's rapid movement prevented significant development for several days. By August 2, a reconnaissance aircraft reported a closed circulation and tropical storm-force winds. As a result, the disturbance became Tropical Storm Earl around 06:00 UTC. Steered generally westward by a ridge over the South United States, Earl intensified amid warm ocean temperatures and low shear, attaining hurricane intensity and peaking with winds of 85 mph (135 km/h) on August 3. Earl struck Turneffe Caye in Belize around 04:00 UTC on August 4 and then made landfall just south of Belize City about two hours later. It quickly weakened over land, but emerged into the Bay of Campeche on August 5 as a minimal tropical storm. A hurricane hunters mission flew into Earl later on August 5, measuring 60 mph (95 km/h) winds. The cyclone made landfall at that intensity near Veracruz, Veracruz, around 02:00 UTC on August 6. Once inland, Earl quickly weakened, falling to tropical depression intensity at 12:00 UTC and dissipating by 18:00 UTC.

The precursor to Earl brought heavy rain and gusty winds to the Lesser Antilles and Greater Antilles. Strong winds in the Dominican Republic downed a power line onto a bus, subsequently causing a fire that killed six people. A boat crash in Samaná Bay killed seven people. Significant impacts were reported in Belize after Earl moved ashore as a hurricane, including downed trees and power lines, blown transformers, damaged or ripped-off roofs, coastal and inland flooding, and a significant storm surge. About 2,000 homes were damaged or destroyed throughout Belize. Damage in the country reached about $110 million. In Mexico, flooding and landslides resulted in severe damage and many deaths, especially in Puebla and Veracruz. In the former, mudslides damaged hundreds of homes, including 350 in the village of Chicahuaxtla alone. Huauchinango observed a month's worth of rainfall in only about 24 hours, resulting in mudslides that killed at least 13 people. Throughout Puebla, there were at least 41 deaths. In Veracruz, Earl and the resultant landslides damaged about 6,300 homes and 26 roadways, while 13 fatalities occurred. Overall, Earl left $132 million in damage and 81 fatalities in Mexico, with 10 other people missing.

=== Tropical Storm Fiona ===
- Tropical storm (SSHWS)
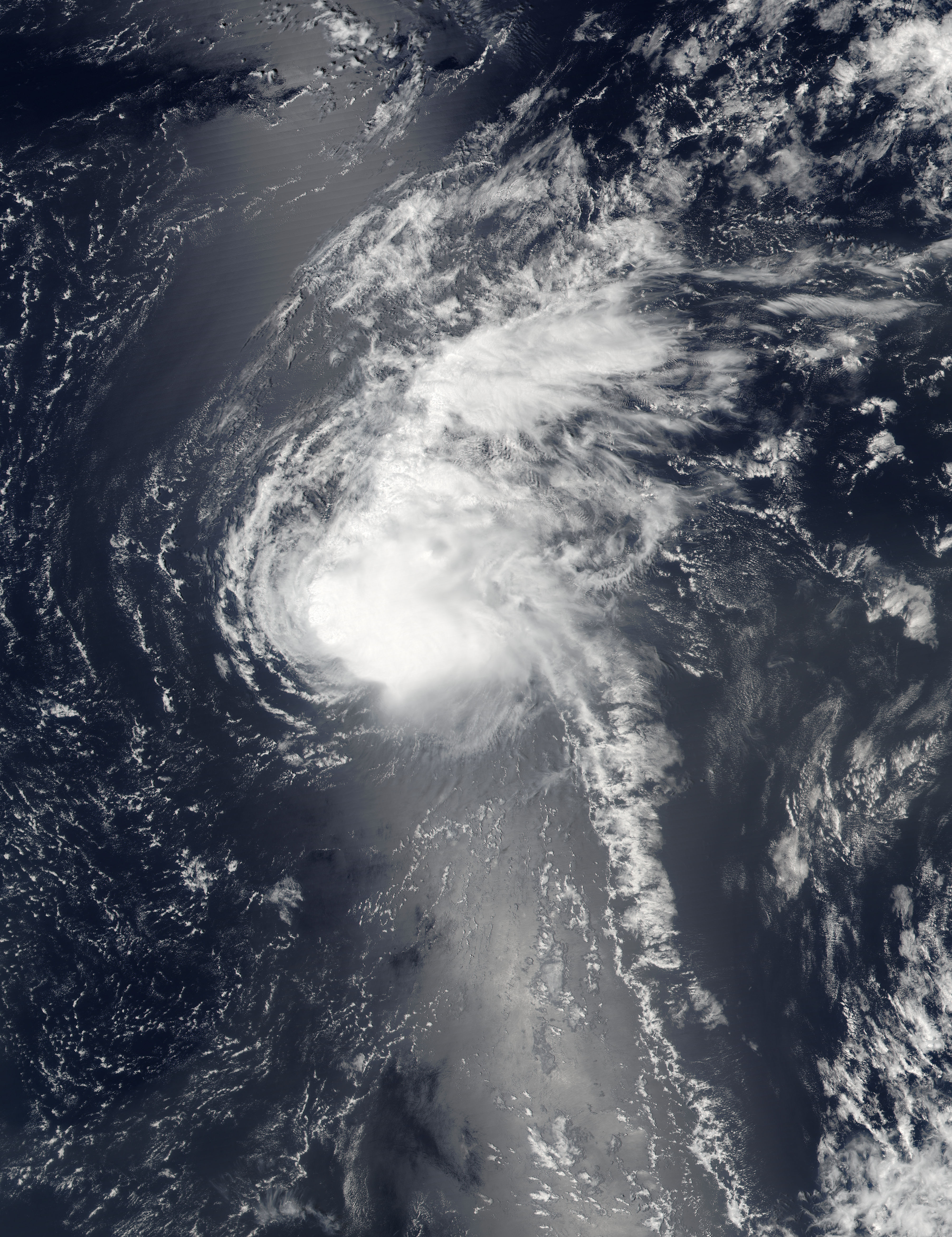
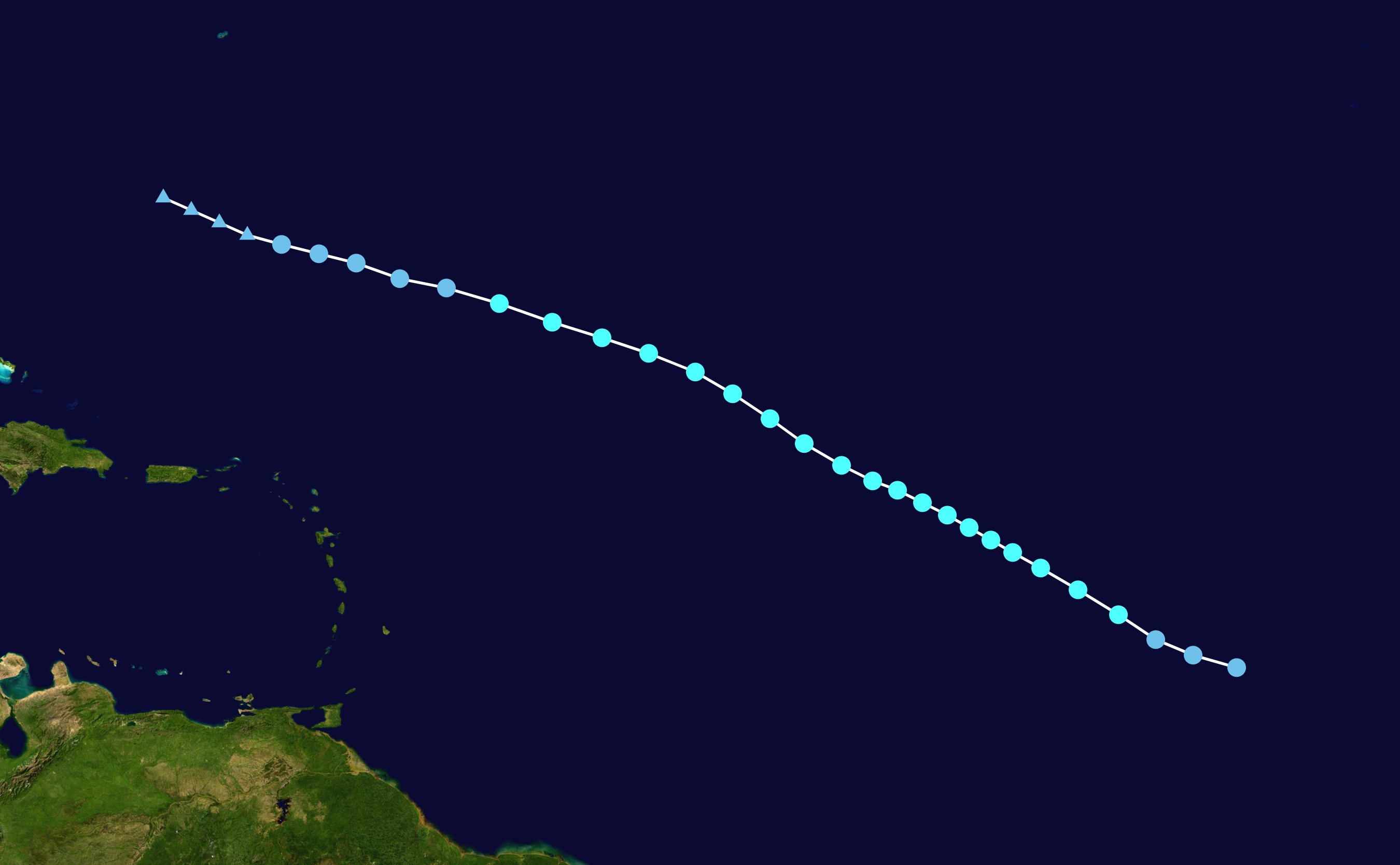
- Duration: August 16 – August 23
- Peak intensity: 50 mph (85 km/h) (1-min); 1004 mbar (hPa)

Late on August 14, the NHC began monitoring a tropical wave and its associated convection off the west coast of Africa for potential development. Steered northwest toward a weakness in the subtropical ridge over the central Atlantic, the wave organized sufficiently to become a tropical depression by 18:00 UTC on August 16. The depression slowly organized after formation and developed a central dense overcast, with the system becoming Tropical Storm Fiona by 12:00 UTC on August 17. Despite strong westerly shear, abundant mid-level dry air, and an otherwise disheveled satellite appearance, an advanced scatterometer (ASCAT) pass indicated a maximum sustained wind speed of 50 mph (80 km/h) early on August 19. Although sporadic bursts of convection continued amid the hostile environment, Fiona weakened to a tropical depression by 06:00 UTC on August 22 and degenerated into a remnant low early on August 23 about 375 mi (605 km) south-southwest of Bermuda. The remnants merged with a weakening frontal zone near Bermuda on August 25.

=== Hurricane Gaston ===
- Category 3 hurricane (SSHWS)
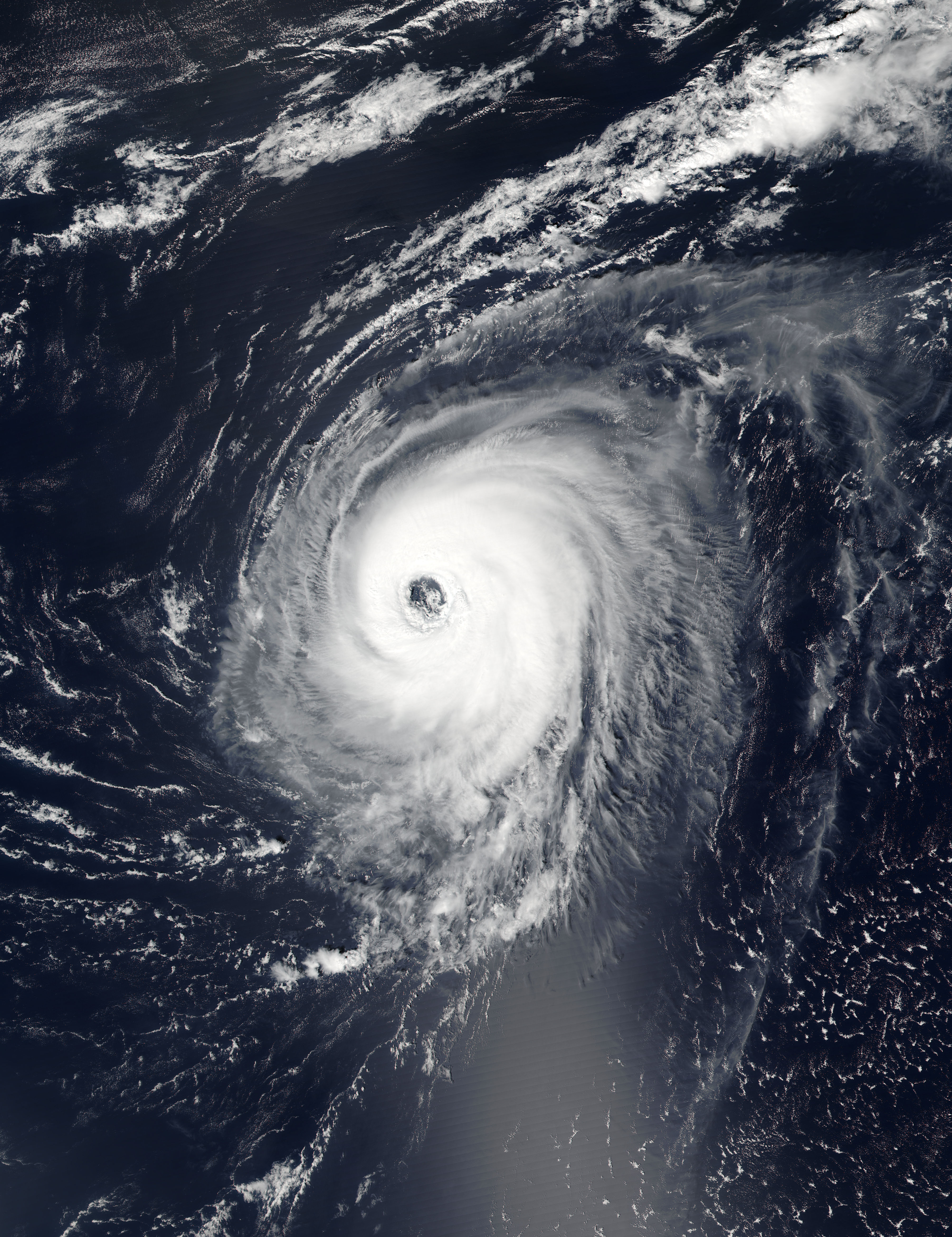
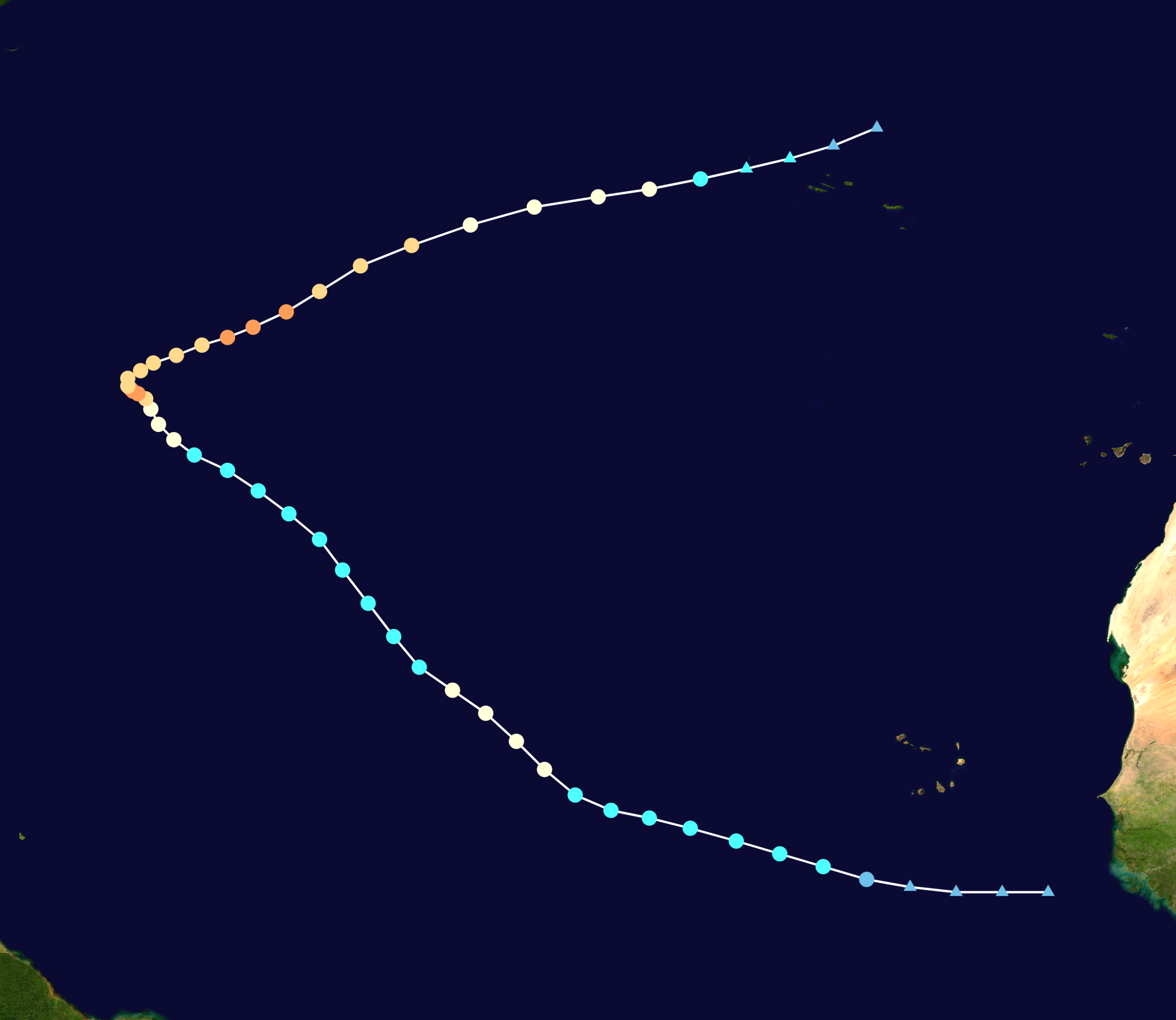
- Duration: August 22 – September 2
- Peak intensity: 120 mph (195 km/h) (1-min); 955 mbar (hPa)

On August 17, the NHC highlighted the potential for tropical cyclogenesis off the western coast of Africa in subsequent days. A weak area of low pressure associated with a tropical wave emerged into the eastern Atlantic three days later, and the disturbance steadily coalesced into a tropical depression by 12:00 UTC on August 22, about 305 mi (490 km) southwest of the southernmost Cabo Verde Islands. The depression organized while heading northwest, intensifying into Tropical Storm Gaston six hours later and attaining hurricane intensity by 12:00 UTC on August 24, in accordance with data from satellites and a NASA Global Hawk unmanned aircraft. After its initial peak in intensity, Gaston's satellite appearance began to degrade as an upper-level low imparted strong southwesterly shear on the cyclone, causing it to weaken back to a tropical storm. Upper-level winds slackened early on August 27, and a timely microwave pass highlighted the presence of a low-level eye well embedded in the storm's central dense overcast, indicating the resumption of Gaston's intensification phase.

Although Gaston continued northwestward, its motion slowed in a weak steering regime. Amid low shear and warm ocean temperatures, Gaston attained hurricane intensity for a second time at 18:00 UTC on August 27. About 24 hours later, the storm deepened to a Category 3 hurricane on the Saffir–Simpson scale, the first major hurricane of the season, by 18:00 UTC the next day. With a symmetric ring of deep convection surrounding a distinct eye, Gaston ultimately peaked with sustained winds of 120 mph (195 km/h) six hours later. A mid-level trough moving southeastward across the North Atlantic eroded a series of ridges steering Gaston, causing the system to drift north and northeast. Cold water upwelling and an eyewall replacement cycle caused Gaston to weaken on August 29, although the cyclone unexpectedly re-intensified to 120 mph (195 km/h) for a second time around 00:00 UTC on August 31. Later that day, it began encountering increasingly cool waters and a higher shear, leading the storm to fall below major hurricane status by 18:00 UTC on August 31, and below hurricane intensity by 12:00 UTC on September 2. Continuous unfavorable conditions caused deep convection to dissipate, and Gaston transitioned into an extratropical cyclone as its center grazed Flores Island at 18:00 UTC. Gaston's remnant circulation dissipated 24 hours later northwest of the Azores.

=== Tropical Depression Eight ===
- Tropical depression (SSHWS)
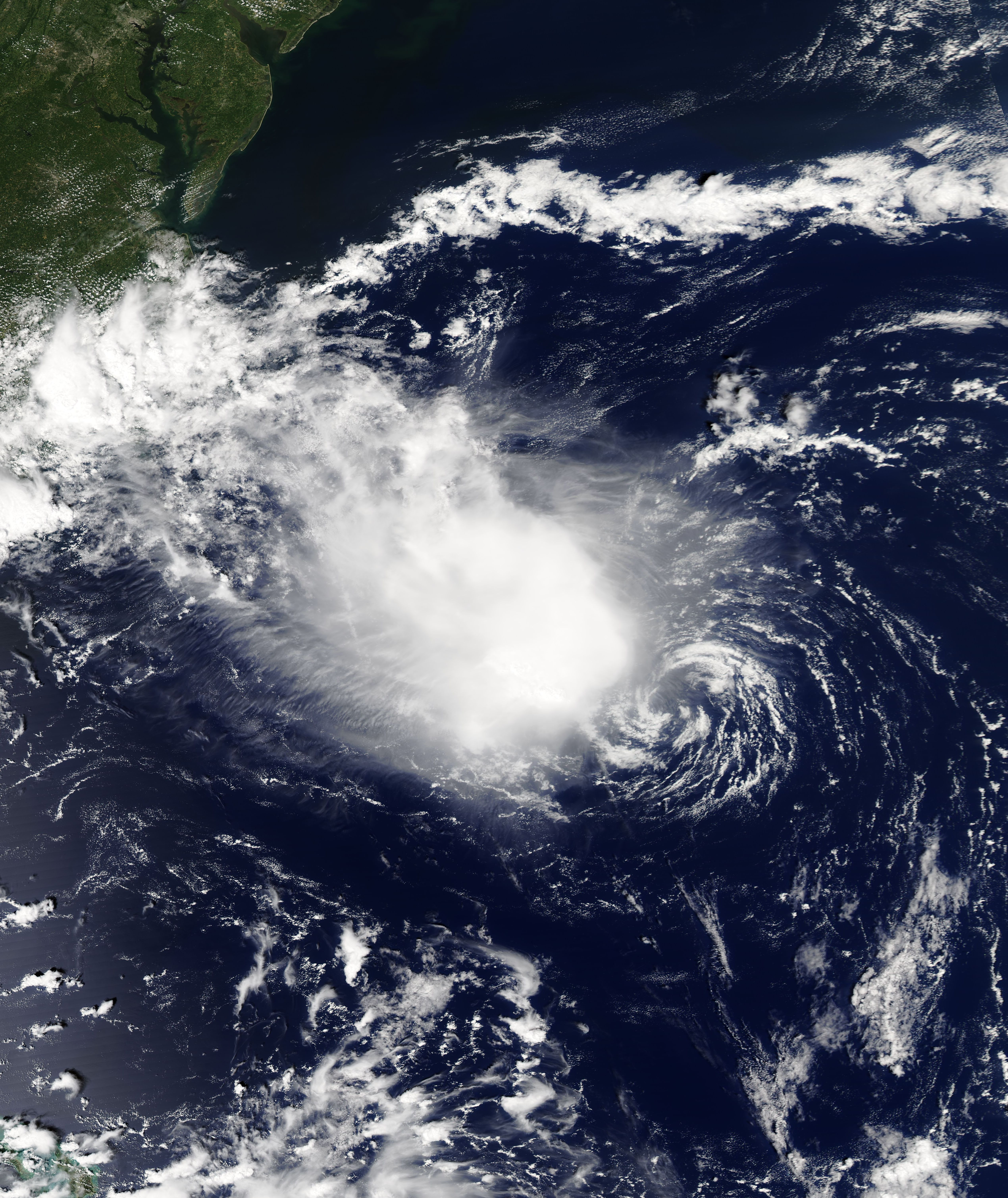
- Duration: August 28 – September 1
- Peak intensity: 35 mph (55 km/h) (1-min); 1010 mbar (hPa)

A broad low pressure developed on August 26 as a frontal boundary stalled near Bermuda and weakened. Early on August 27, the low became well-defined, but lacked sufficient convection, and was plagued by unfavorable conditions such as dry air and moderate wind shear. However, a large burst of convection near and to the west of the center prompted the upgrade to Tropical Depression Eight at 12:00 UTC on August 28 about 350 mi (560 km) southeast of Cape Hatteras, North Carolina. A ridge to the north steered the depression westward into an area of moderate wind shear. Late on August 28, the center became exposed from the convection, but convection increased again after about 24 hours. As it approached the Carolina coastline on August 30, a weakness in the subtropical ridge caused the depression to slow down and turn northward; its closest approach to the United States was 60 mi (95 km) south-southeast of Cape Hatteras later that day. The depression then turned eastward in response to becoming entangled in the mid-latitude westerlies. As it accelerated, the circulation began to become elongated. The depression degenerated into a trough of low pressure by 00:00 UTC on September 1. The remnants were absorbed into a frontal system on September 2.

The precursor low dropped about 1.4 in (36 mm) of rainfall on Bermuda, triggering some localized flooding. As the depression approached the coastline, a tropical storm watch was issued for Cape Lookout to Oregon Inlet, North Carolina, early on August 29. This was later upgraded to a warning with the addition of including the Pamlico Sound. As the depression failed to intensify and moved away from the coastline, the warnings were discontinued at 00:00 UTC on August 31. There were only reports of some rainfall, gusty winds, and minor surf in the Outer Banks.

=== Hurricane Hermine ===
- Category 1 hurricane (SSHWS)
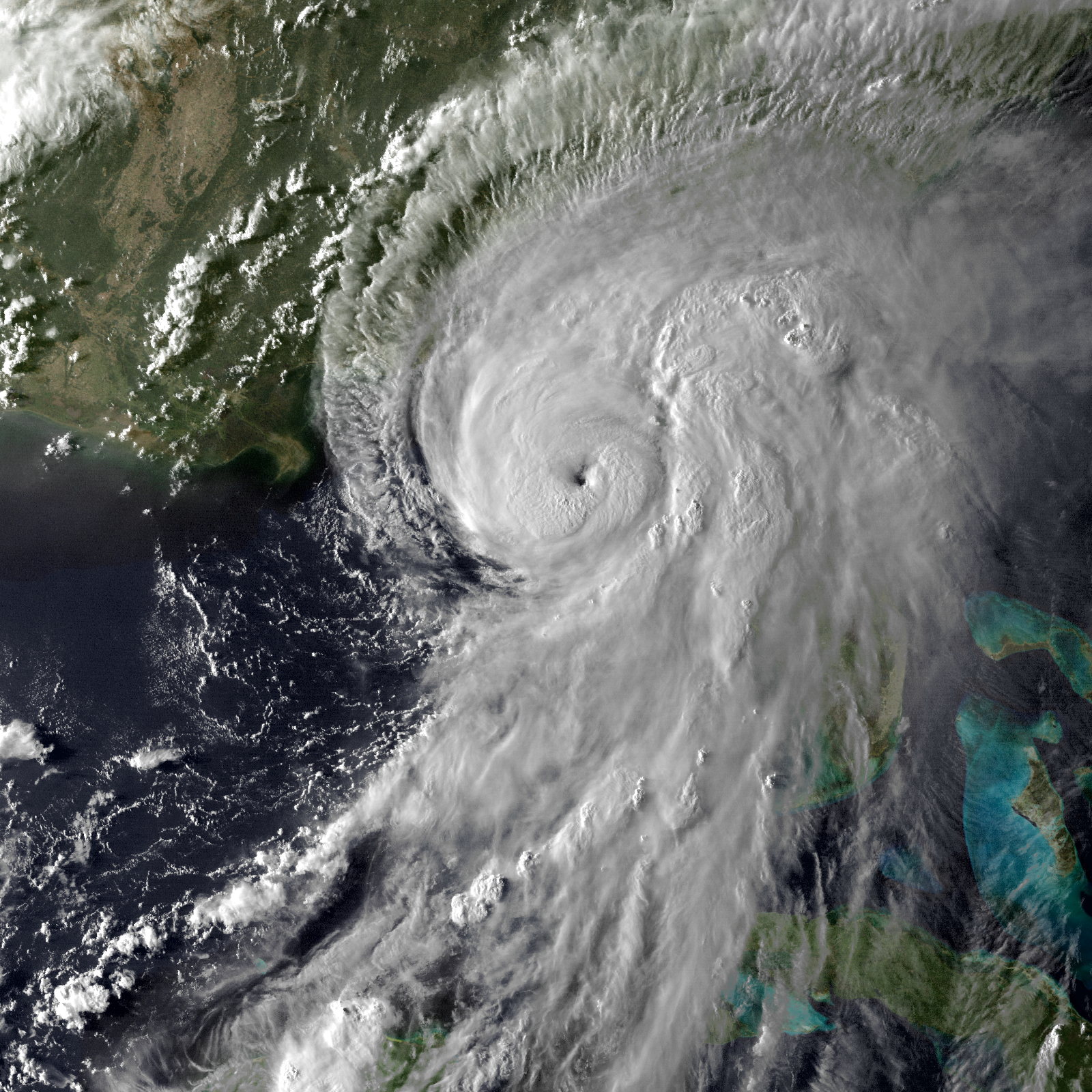
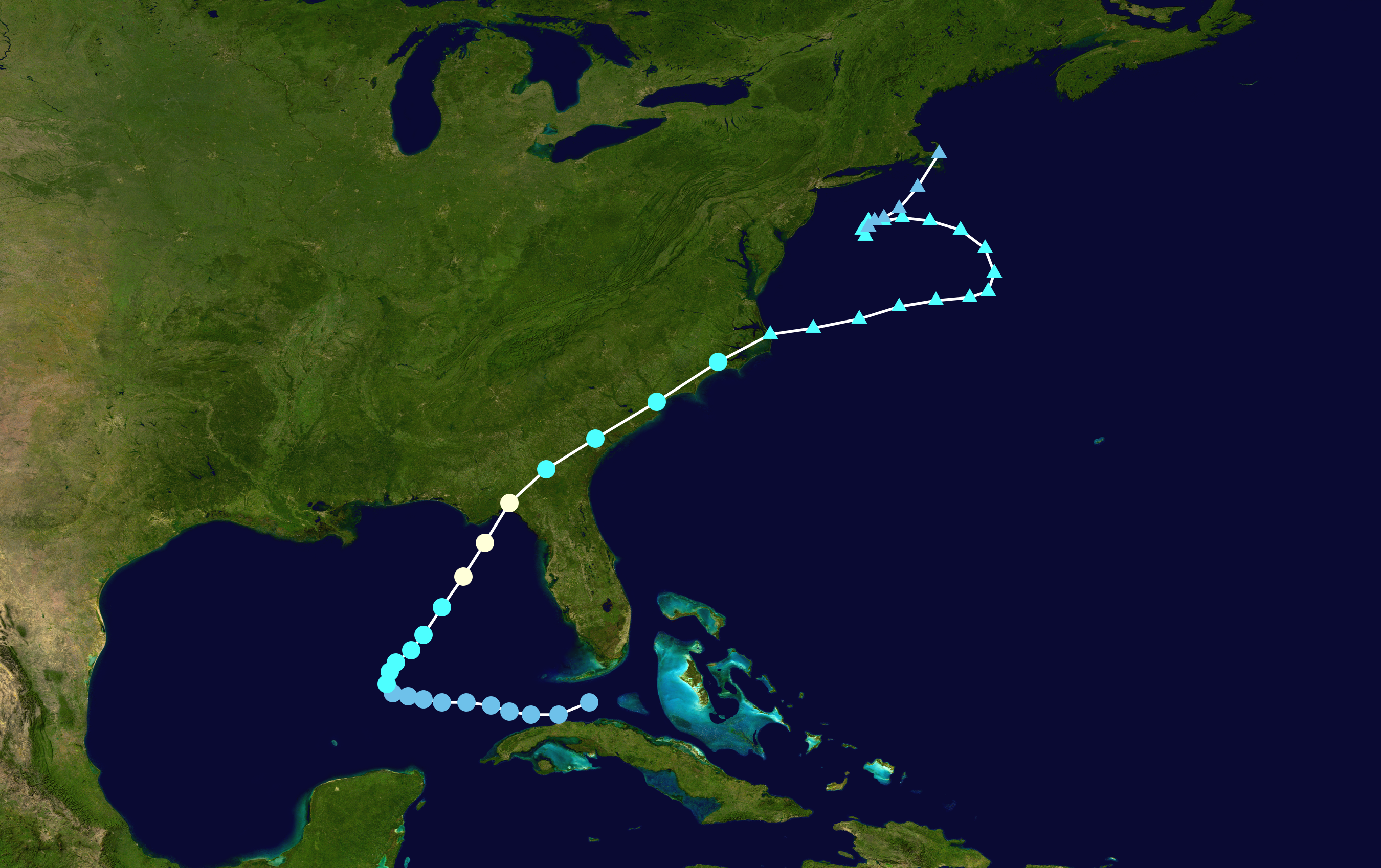
- Duration: August 28 – September 3
- Peak intensity: 80 mph (130 km/h) (1-min); 981 mbar (hPa)

A tropical wave emerged into the Atlantic from the west coast of Africa between August 16 and August 17. The wave failed to develop for several days due to its quick movement and dry air. Deep convection eventually consolidated and a circulation finally developed by August 28, with a tropical depression developing at 18:00 UTC, about 60 mi (95 km) south-southeast of Key West, Florida. Initially, the depression moved westward, until a break in a ridge caused it to move northeastward early on August 31. Around that time, the cyclone intensified into Tropical Storm Hermine. The storm steadily intensified into an 80 mph (130 km/h) Category 1 hurricane by early on September 2, becoming the first hurricane to form in the Gulf of Mexico since Ingrid in 2013. Hermine made landfall near St. Marks, Florida, at 05:30 UTC. After moving inland, Hermine quickly weakened and transitioned into an extratropical cyclone on September 3 near the Outer Banks of North Carolina. The remnant system meandered offshore the Northeastern United States before dissipating over southeastern Massachusetts on September 8.

The precursor system dropped heavy precipitation in portions of the Caribbean, especially the Dominican Republic and Cuba. In the former, the storm damaged more than 200 homes and displaced more than 1,000 people. Although some areas of Cuba recorded over 12 in (300 mm) of rain, the precipitation was generally beneficial due to a severe drought. In Florida, abnormally high tides and heavy precipitation along the gulf coast caused significant damage. In Citrus County, one of the worst areas impacted, 2,694 structures were damaged, of which 531 experienced severe damage, while damage reached about $102 million. Similar coastal and freshwater flooding occurred in Pasco County, where 7 homes were destroyed, 305 sustained major damage, and 1,564 received minor damage. Winds primarily left power outages and downed trees, some of which fell onto buildings and vehicles. About 325,000 people were left without electricity. Near Ocala, a tree fell on a homeless man's tent, killing him. Flooding and fairly strong winds in other states such as Georgia, South Carolina, and North Carolina caused additional damage, but to a lesser extent. One death each occurred in South Carolina and North Carolina. In New York, two fishermen drowned near the Wading River on Long Island due to rough surf. Overall, Hermine caused about $550 million in damage in the United States.

=== Tropical Storm Ian ===
- Tropical storm (SSHWS)
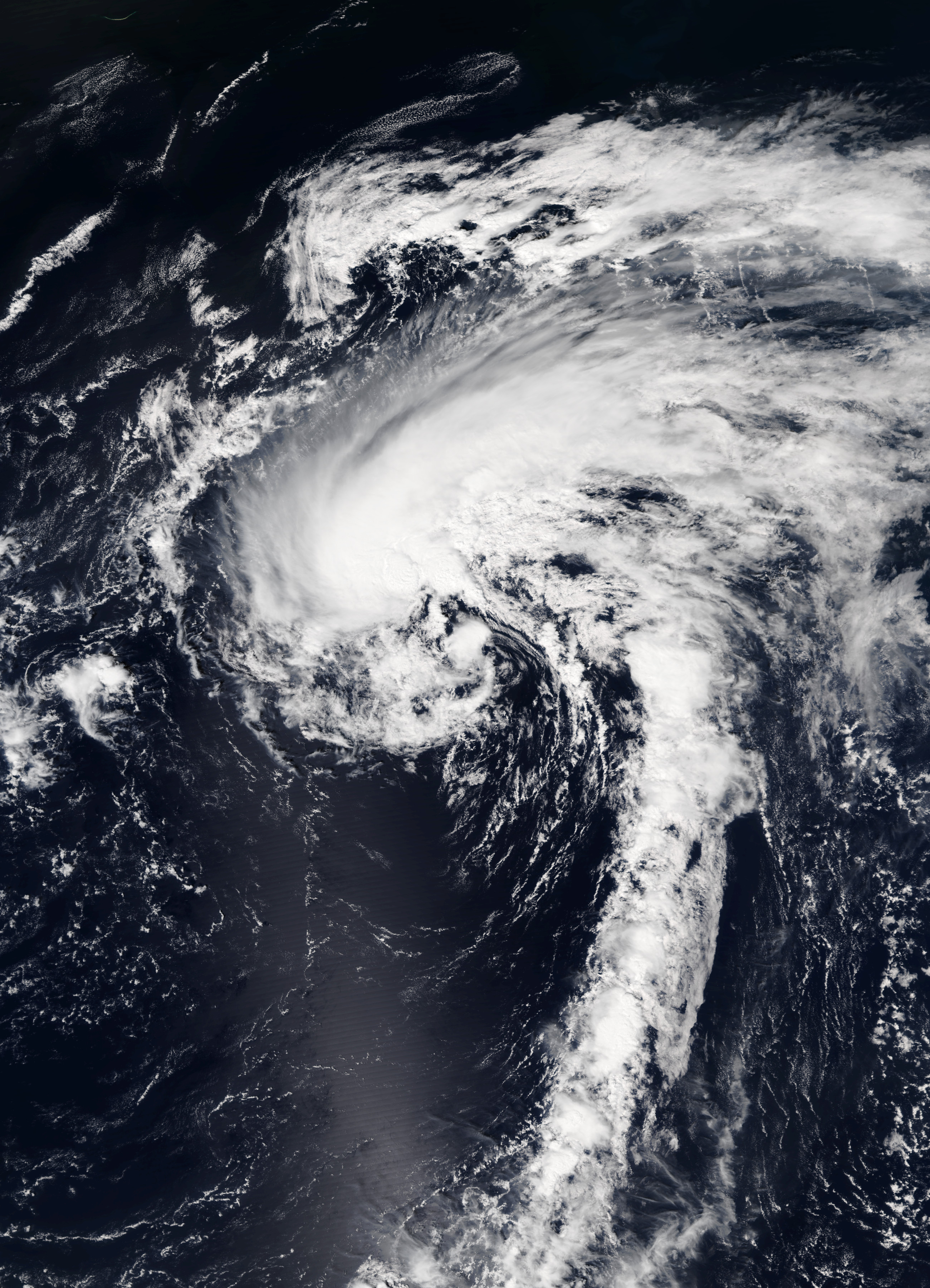
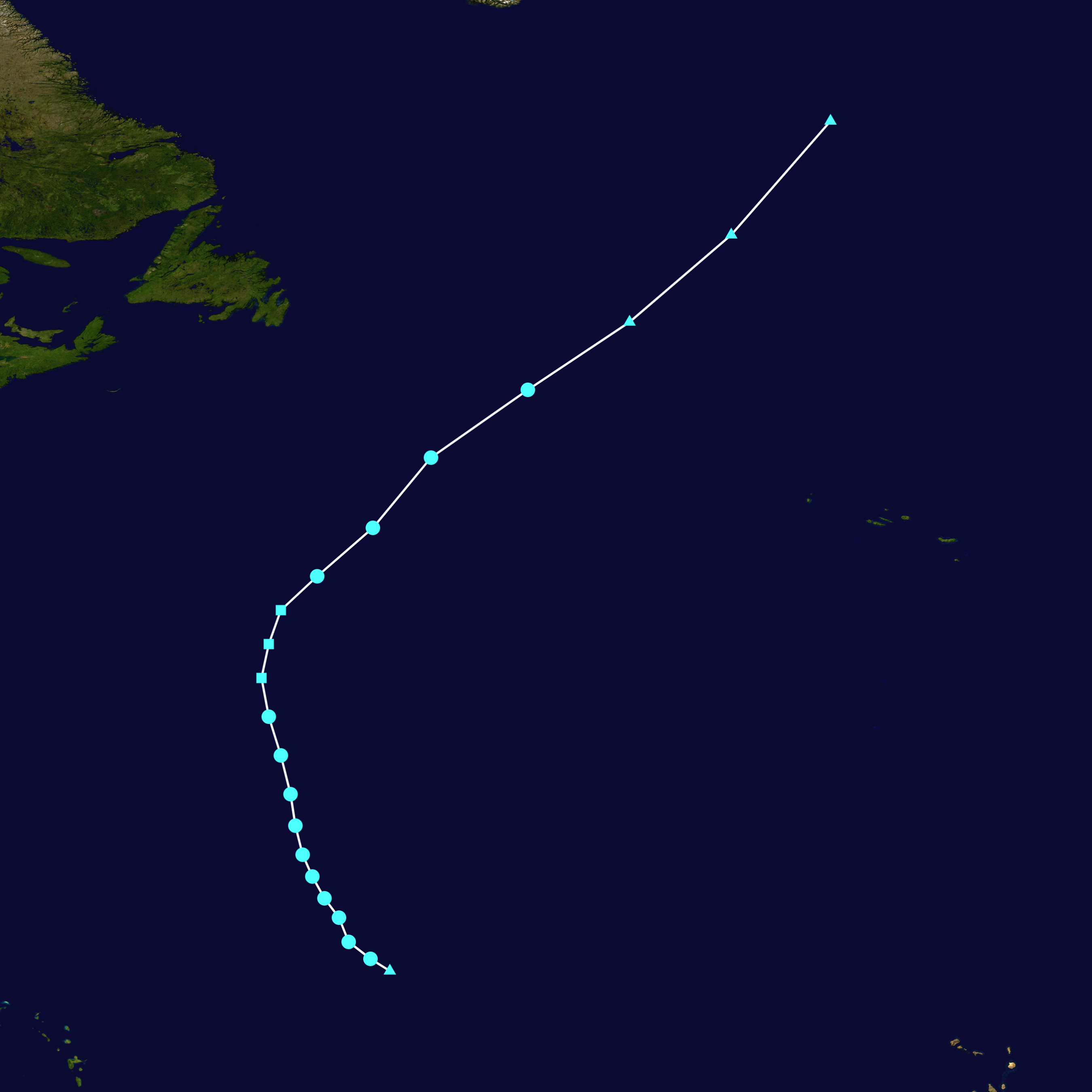
- Duration: September 12 – September 16
- Peak intensity: 60 mph (95 km/h) (1-min); 994 mbar (hPa)

On September 5, the NHC indicated that the development of a tropical cyclone was possible in the East Atlantic over subsequent days. A tropical wave emerged off the west coast of Africa on September 6, slowly coalescing into Tropical Storm Ian by 06:00 UTC on September 12. Steered north and the northeast by an approaching upper-level trough, the cyclone struggled within an environment of high shear, with its low-level center displaced west of its associated convection. An upper-trough became superimposed with the storm's center by late on September 14, yielding a more subtropical-like appearance on conventional satellite. As a result, Ian briefly transitioned into a subtropical storm around 18:00 UTC, but re-acquired tropical characteristics just 18 hours later while moving northeastward away from the aforementioned trough. By 06:00 UTC on September 16, a small mid-level eye became apparent and Ian began to intensify, with winds reaching 60 mph (95 km/h) at that time. However, deep convection soon dissipated as cold air wrapped into the center, marking Ian's transition into an extratropical cyclone around 12:00 UTC. On September 17, Ian's remnants were absorbed by a larger extratropical cyclone and soon dissipated.

=== Tropical Storm Julia ===
- Tropical storm (SSHWS)
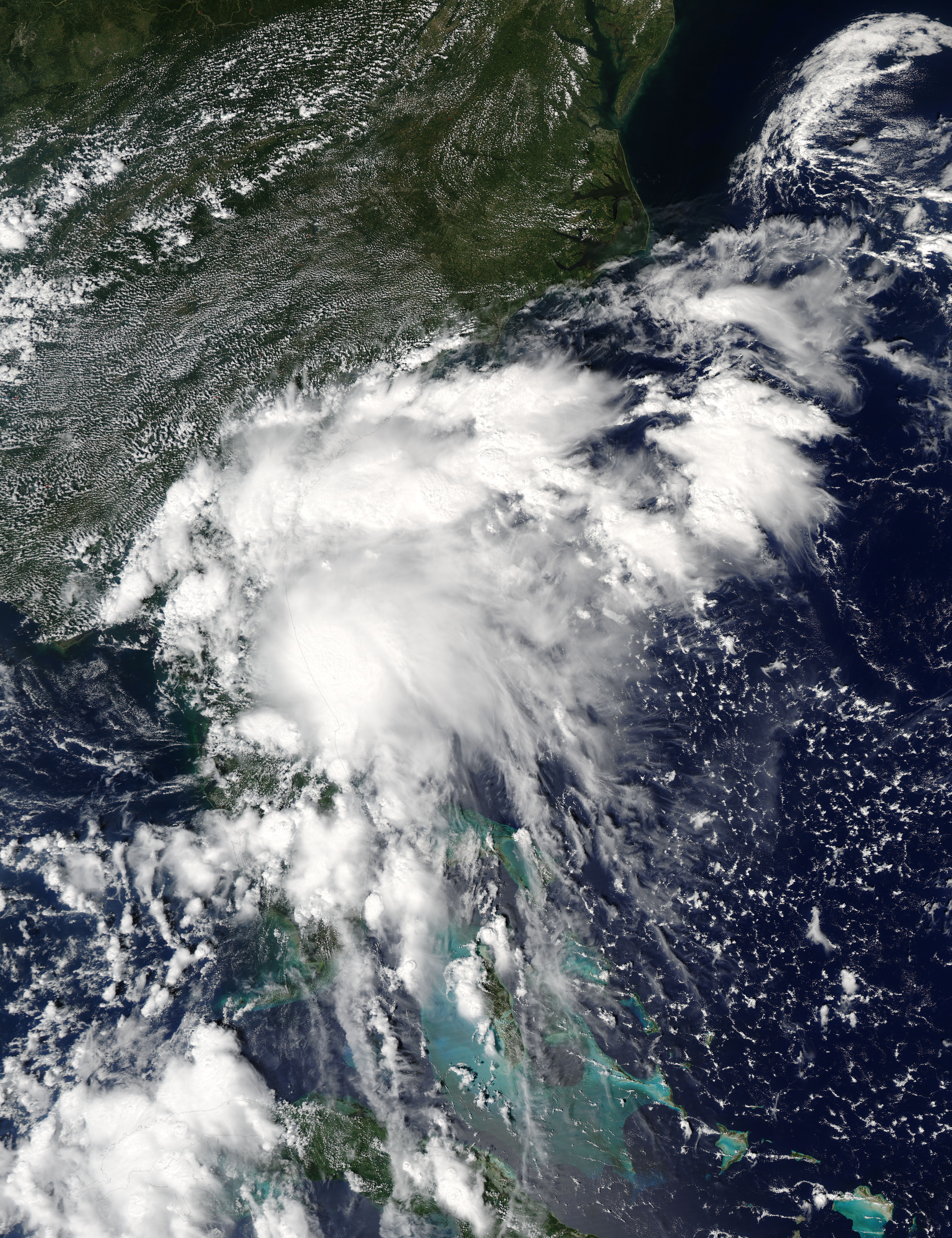
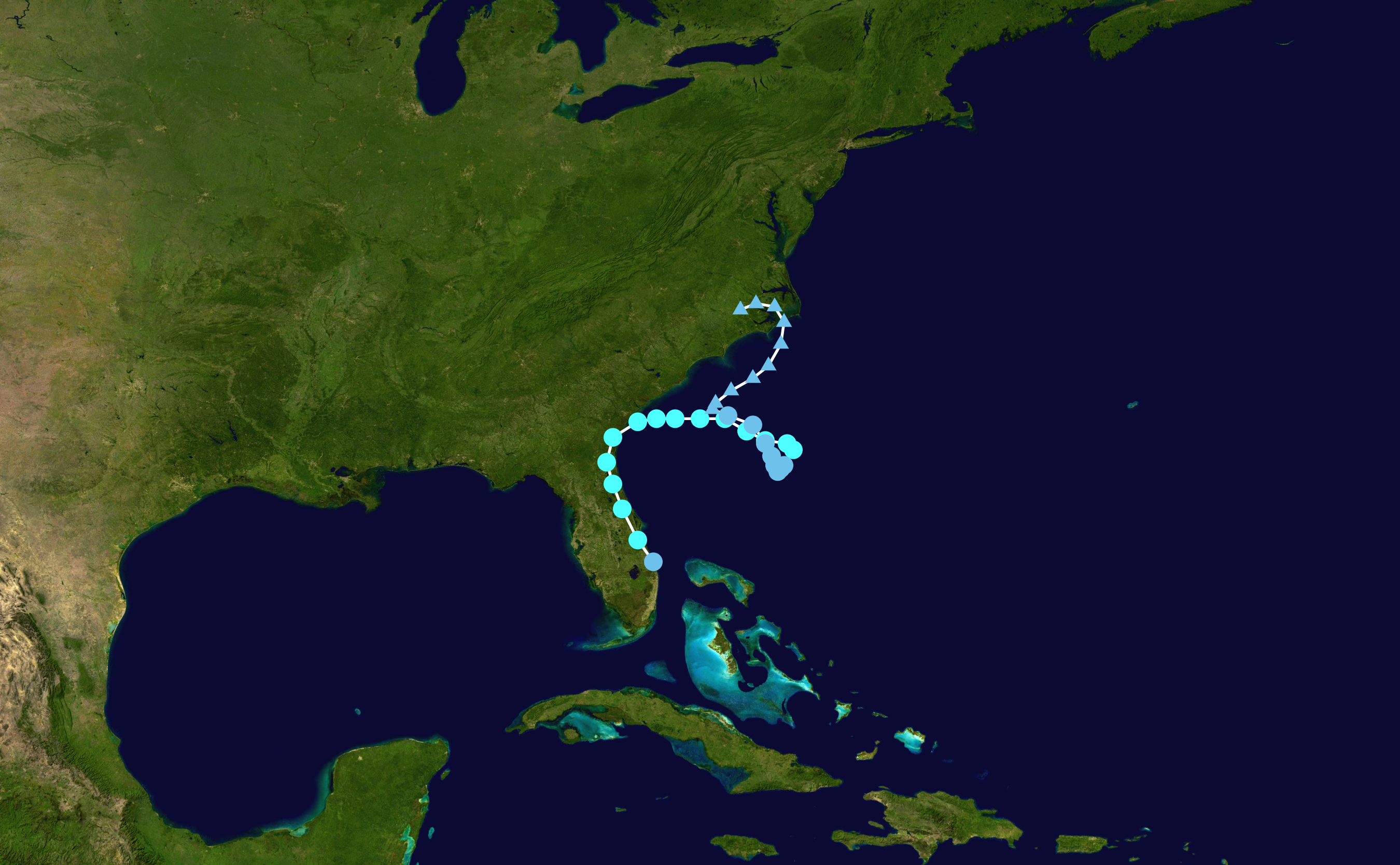
- Duration: September 13 – September 18
- Peak intensity: 50 mph (85 km/h) (1-min); 1007 mbar (hPa)

On September 1, a tropical wave entered the Atlantic from the west coast of Africa. A low-pressure area developed after a burst in convection near the Leeward Islands around September 6, but dry air and wind shear inhibited further development. At 06:00 UTC on September 13, the system maintained sufficient organization to become a tropical depression. Around that time, it made landfall in Jensen Beach, Florida. Despite being inland, the depression intensified into Tropical Storm Julia over Jacksonville and peaked with winds of 50 mph (80 km/h) shortly thereafter. The cyclone drifted north-northwestward and then northeastward, moving offshore the Southeastern United States on September 14 under a weak steering regime. A cyclonic loop occurred as strong westerly air developed in the region. The shear caused fluctuations in intensity, while there were bursts of convection around the disorganized center. By September 19, the center of Julia was devoid of strong convection, as rainbands rapidly diminished, and soon degraded into a remnant low. The remnants dissipated over eastern North Carolina on September 21.

In its precursor and early stages, the storm caused generally minor wind and flooding damage in Florida, Georgia, and South Carolina due to its asymmetrical structure and fairly weak intensity. Parts of North Carolina received as much as 12 in (300 mm) of rain, while as much as 18 in (460 mm) fell in the Hampton Roads area of Virginia. A total of 63 people had to be rescued from their homes, and 61 were evacuated from nursing homes. One million gallons of sewage from Elizabeth City flowed into the Pasquotank River and Charles Creek. The Cashie River in Windsor, North Carolina, reached 15 ft (4.6 m) on September 22, 2 ft (0.61 m) above flood stage. That same day, Governor Pat McCrory declared a state of emergency in 11 counties. Schools were closed in Bertie, Currituck and Hertford counties. Overall, Julia caused about $6.13 million in damage.

=== Tropical Storm Karl ===
- Tropical storm (SSHWS)
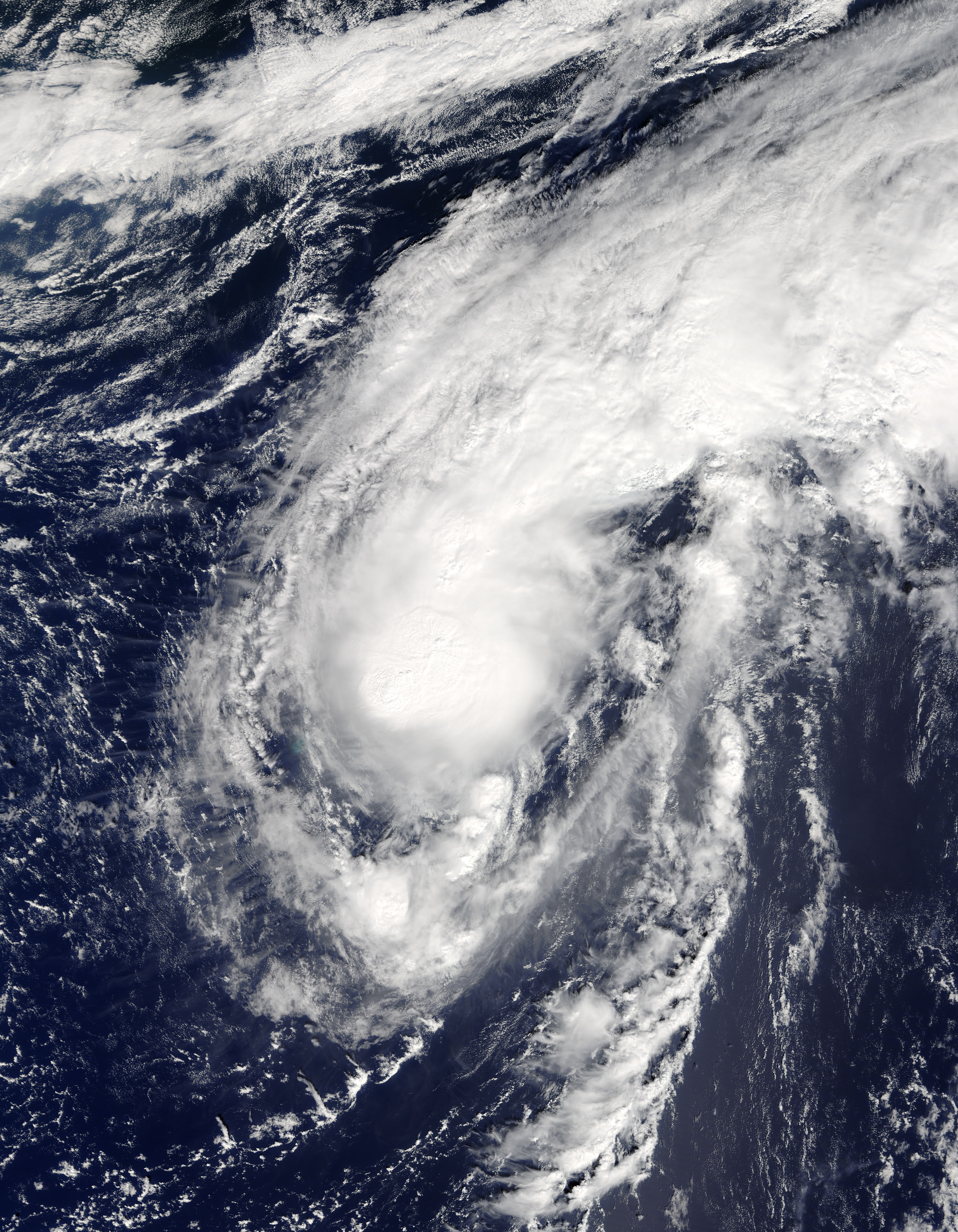
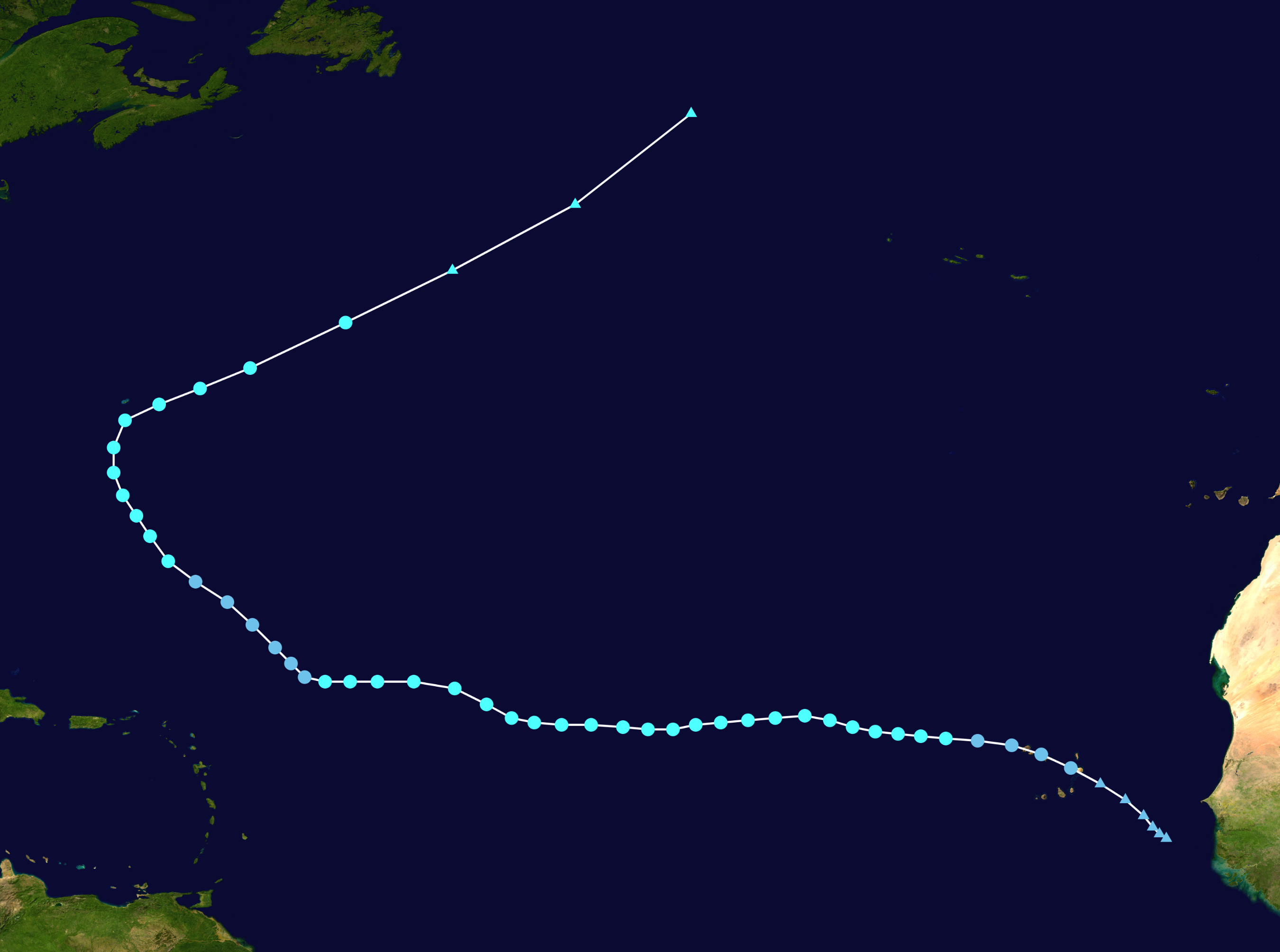
- Duration: September 14 – September 25
- Peak intensity: 70 mph (110 km/h) (1-min); 988 mbar (hPa)

A tropical wave emerged into the Atlantic from the west coast of Africa on September 12. The wave steadily organized while passing through the Cabo Verde Islands, and attained sufficient organization to be declared a tropical depression by 06:00 UTC on September 14. Strong shear plagued the cyclone, with its low-level circulation misplaced from the convection. By 06:00 UTC on September 15, however, a significant burst of deep convection prompted the depression's upgrade to Tropical Storm Karl. The cyclone continued west for several days across the unfavorable central Atlantic, with convection sheared to the northeast and the circulation occasionally becoming poorly defined. Despite continued predictions of intensification into a powerful hurricane, Karl instead succumbed to the hostile conditions and weakened to a tropical depression around 06:00 UTC on September 21 as it passed close to an upper-level low. However, by the following day, the upper-level low moved away to the south, causing a reduction in shear that allowed the system to reattain tropical storm intensity as it curved near Bermuda. Accelerating east-northeastwards, Karl continued to strengthen and it attained peak winds of 70 mph (115 km/h) early on September 25. However, cold air encroached on the low-level circulation by 12:00 UTC that day, marking Karl's transition to an extratropical cyclone. Karl's remnant low continued northeast over the North Atlantic and was absorbed by another extratropical system early on September 26.

In Bermuda, about 800 people lost power indirectly from the storm due to a mainline fault on the island. Otherwise, damage was relatively minor. Sustained winds of 46 mph (74 km/h) and gusts to over 68 mph (109 km/h) were observed, along with 4.71 in (120 mm) of rainfall; this contributed to the wettest September on record in Bermuda. Long-period swells from Karl reached the East Coast of the United States as the storm moved out to sea.

=== Tropical Storm Lisa ===
- Tropical storm (SSHWS)
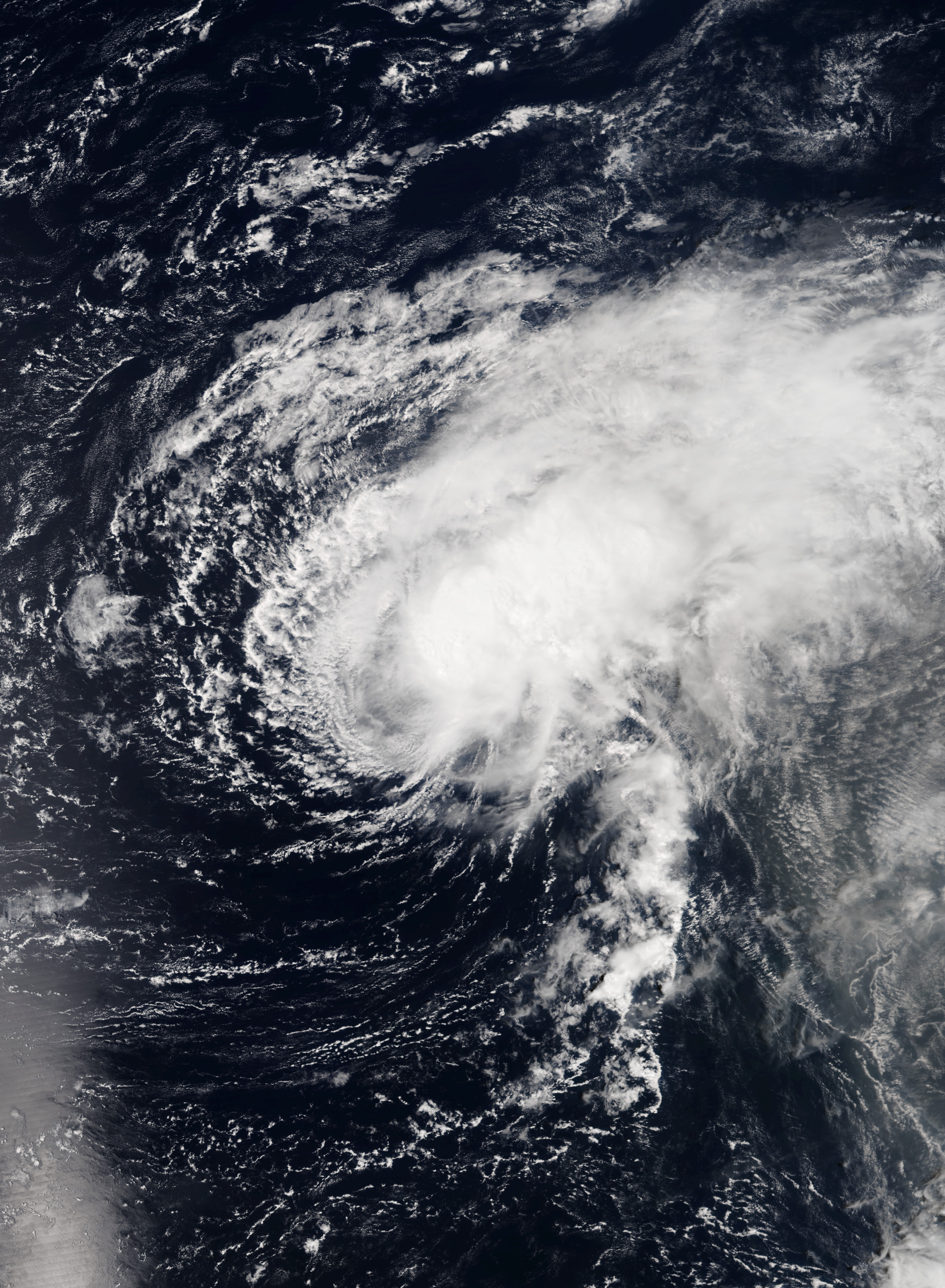
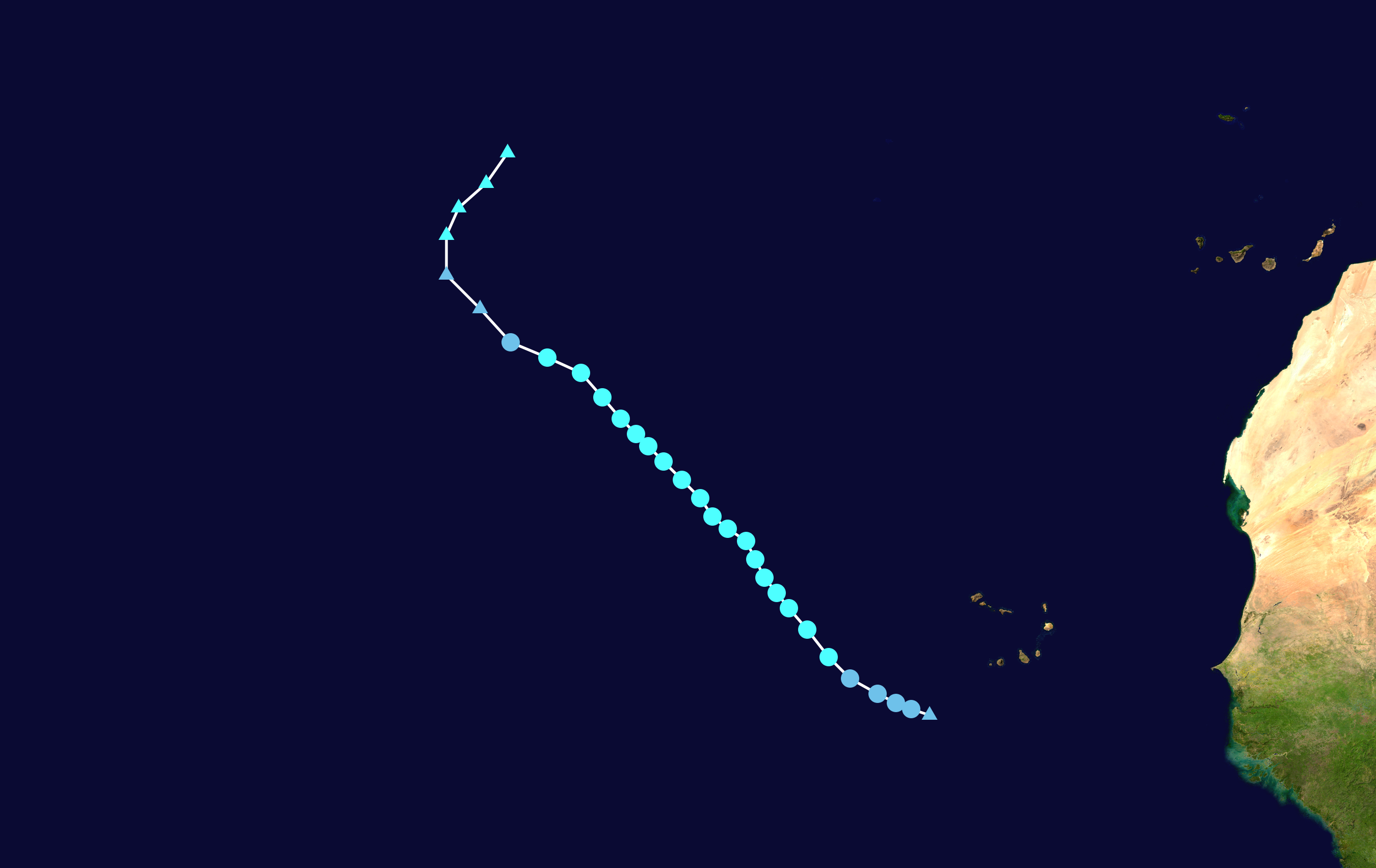
- Duration: September 19 – September 25
- Peak intensity: 50 mph (85 km/h) (1-min); 999 mbar (hPa)

On September 14, the NHC noted the potential for tropical cyclone development in the East Atlantic later in the week. A tropical wave moved off the west coast of Africa on September 16, developing into a tropical depression by 12:00 UTC on September 19, about 225 mi (360 km) west-southwest of the southernmost Cabo Verde Islands. The following day, the system strengthened into Tropical Storm Lisa. Around 12:00 UTC on September 22, Lisa peaked with sustained winds of 50 mph (80 km/h) and a minimum pressure of 999 mbar (29.5 inHg). The storm soon began weakening due increasing wind shear, but briefly restrengthened on September 24. Lisa managed to maintain tropical storm intensity despite battling unfavorable conditions until early on September 25, when it weakened to a tropical depression. Lisa became a remnant low at 06:00 UTC. The remnants were monitored for potential regeneration, but the system failed to redevelop and dissipated later that day.

=== Hurricane Matthew ===
- Category 5 hurricane (SSHWS)
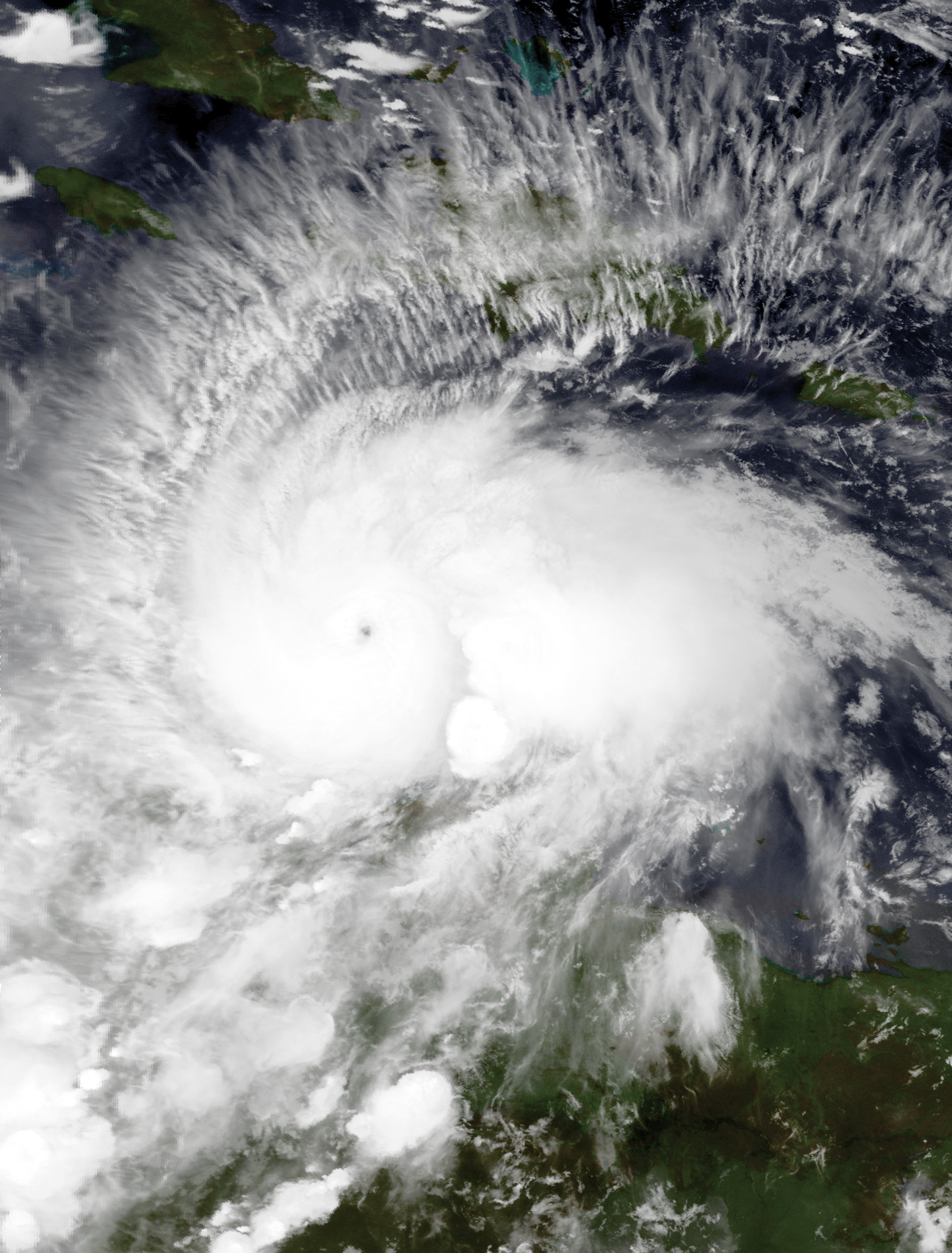
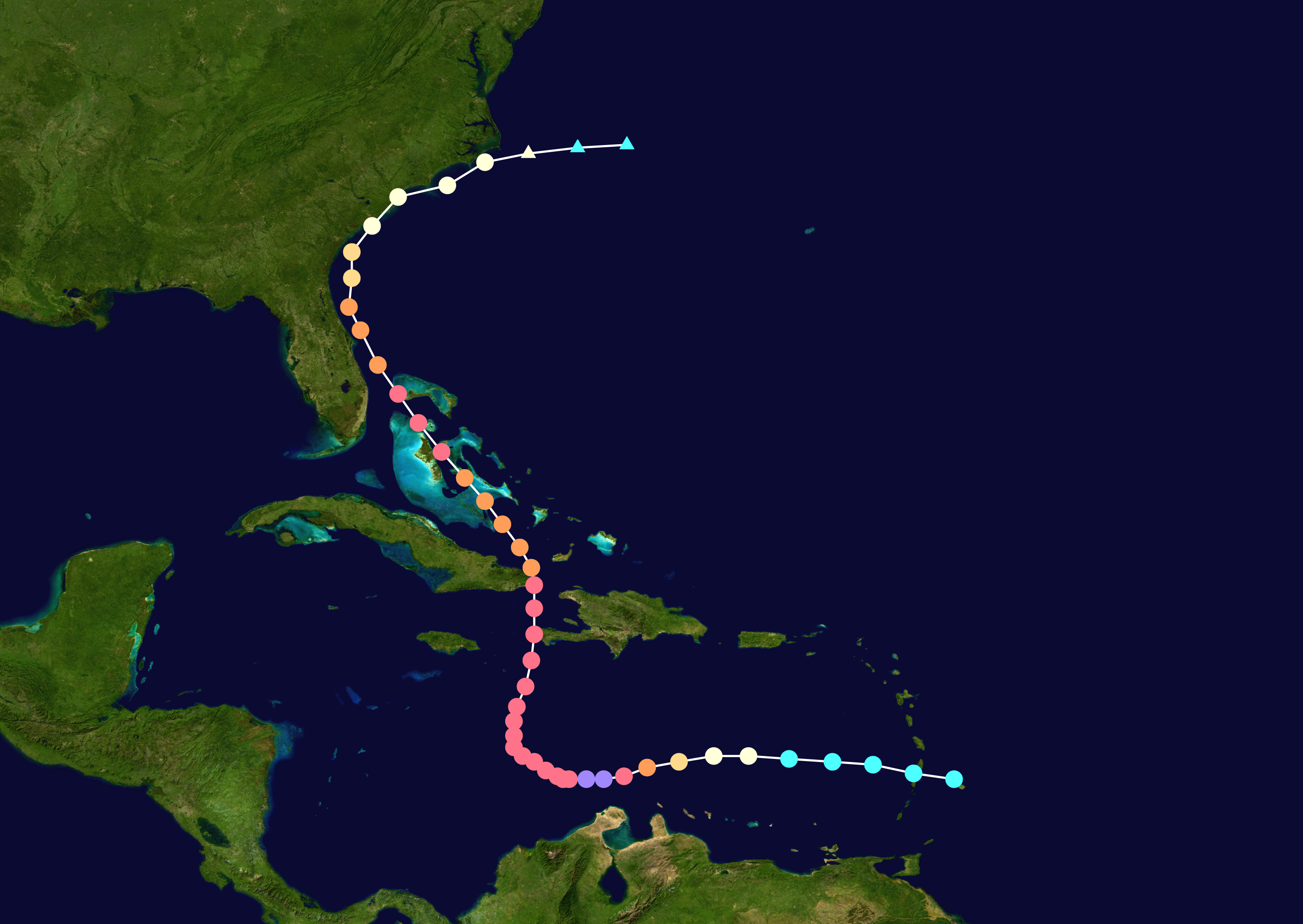
- Duration: September 28 – October 9
- Peak intensity: 165 mph (270 km/h) (1-min); 934 mbar (hPa)

A tropical wave developed into Tropical Storm Matthew near Barbados on September 28. Continuing westward under the influence of a mid-level ridge, the storm steadily intensified to attain hurricane intensity by 18:00 UTC on September 29. The effects of southwesterly wind shear unexpectedly abated late that day, and Matthew began a period of rapid intensification; during a 24-hour period beginning at 00:00 UTC on September 30, the cyclone's maximum winds more than doubled, from 80 mph (130 km/h) to 165 mph (265 km/h), making Matthew a Category 5 hurricane, the first since Hurricane Felix in 2007. Due to upwelling of cooler waters, Matthew weakened to a Category 4 hurricane later on October 1. Matthew remained a powerful Category 4 hurricane for several days, making landfall near Les Anglais, Haiti, around 11:00 UTC on October 4 with winds of 150 mph (240 km/h). Continuing northward, the cyclone struck Maisí in Cuba early on October 5. Cuba's and Haiti's mountainous terrain weakened Matthew to Category 3 status, as it began to accelerate northwestwards through the Bahamas.

Restrengthening occurred as Matthew's circulation became better organized, with the storm becoming a Category 4 hurricane again while passing Freeport. However, Matthew began to weaken again as an eyewall replacement cycle took place. The storm significantly weakened while closely paralleling the coasts of Florida and Georgia, with the northwestern portion of the outer eyewall coming ashore in Florida while the system was a Category 3 hurricane. Matthew weakened to a Category 2 hurricane late on October 7 and then to a Category 1 hurricane by 12:00 UTC on October 8. About three hours later, the hurricane made landfall at Cape Romain National Wildlife Refuge, near McClellanville, South Carolina, with winds of 85 mph (135 km/h). Convection became displaced as Matthew pulled away from land, with the storm becoming extratropical about 200 mi (320 km) east of Cape Hatteras, North Carolina, on October 9.

Heavy rains and strong winds buffeted the Lesser Antilles. The winds caused widespread power outages and damaged crops, particularly in St. Lucia, while flooding and landslides caused by the rainfall damaged many homes and roads. One person died in St. Vincent when he was crushed by a boulder. The storm brought precipitation to Colombia's Guajira Peninsula, which saw its first heavy rain event in three years. One person drowned in a river in Uribia. In Haiti, flooding and high winds disrupted telecommunications and destroyed extensive swaths of land; around 80% of Jérémie sustained significant damage. Matthew left about $1.9 billion in damage and at least 546 deaths. Heavy rainfall spread eastward across the Dominican Republic, where four were killed. Effects in Cuba were most severe along the coast, where storm surge caused extensive damage. Four people were killed due to a bridge collapse, and total losses in the country amounted to $2.58 billion, most of which occurred in the Guantánamo Province. Passing through the Bahamas as a major hurricane, Matthew inflicted severe impacts across several islands, particularly Grand Bahama, where an estimated 95% of homes sustained damage in the townships of Eight Mile Rock and Holmes Rock. In Florida, much of the damage occurred was caused by strong winds and storm surge in the east-central and northeastern portions of the state. About 1.2 million people lost power. Damage in Florida reached over $2.75 billion and there were 12 deaths. An additional 1.3 million people lost electricity in Georgia and South Carolina combined. Torrential rain caused severe flooding, especially in North Carolina and South Carolina, where some rivers exceed record heights set by Hurricane Floyd and the 1928 Okeechobee hurricane. In North Carolina, 100,000 structures were flooded and damage reached $1.5 billion. Overall, Matthew caused at least 603 deaths and about $15.1 billion in damage.

=== Hurricane Nicole ===
- Category 4 hurricane (SSHWS)
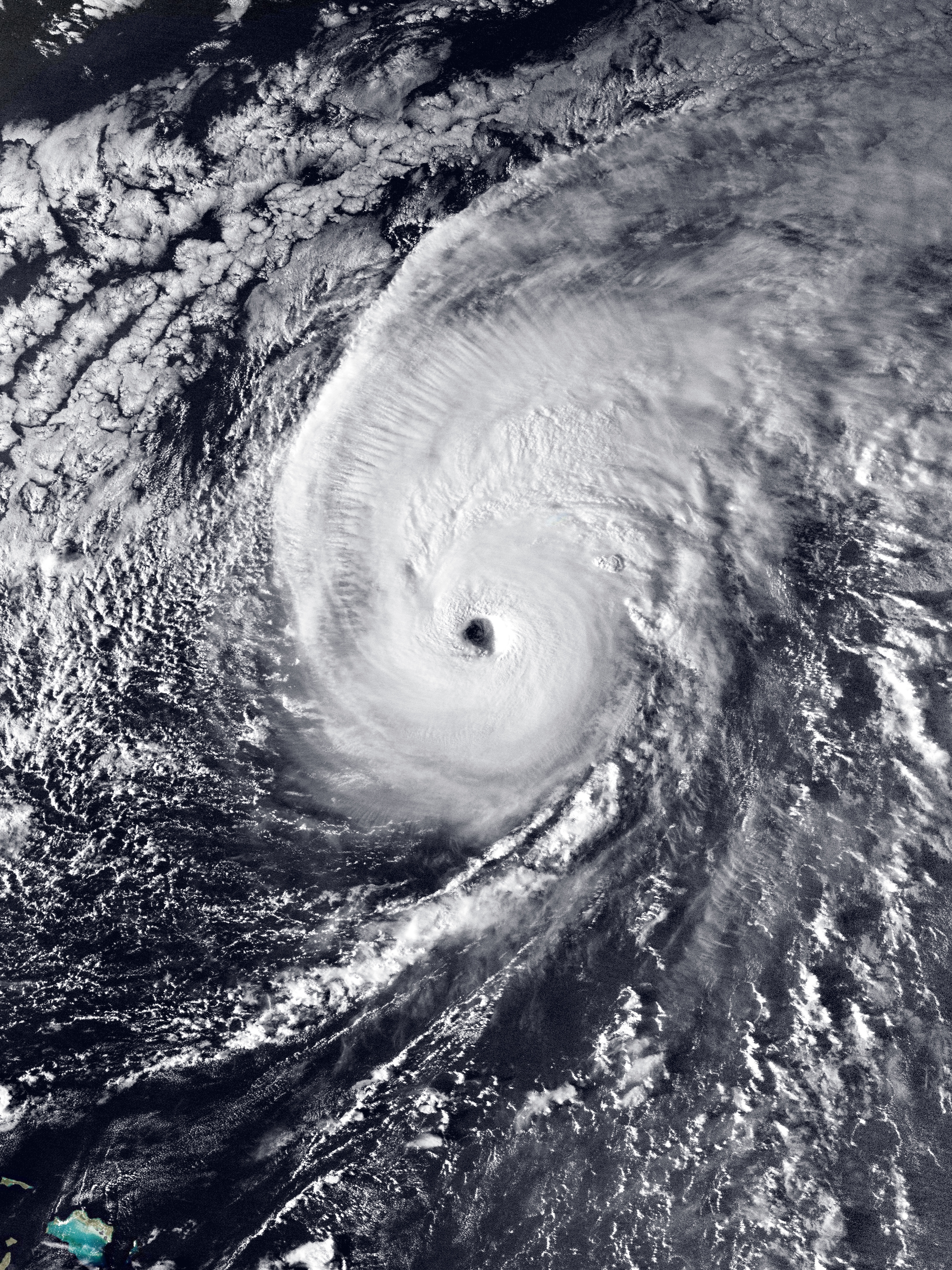
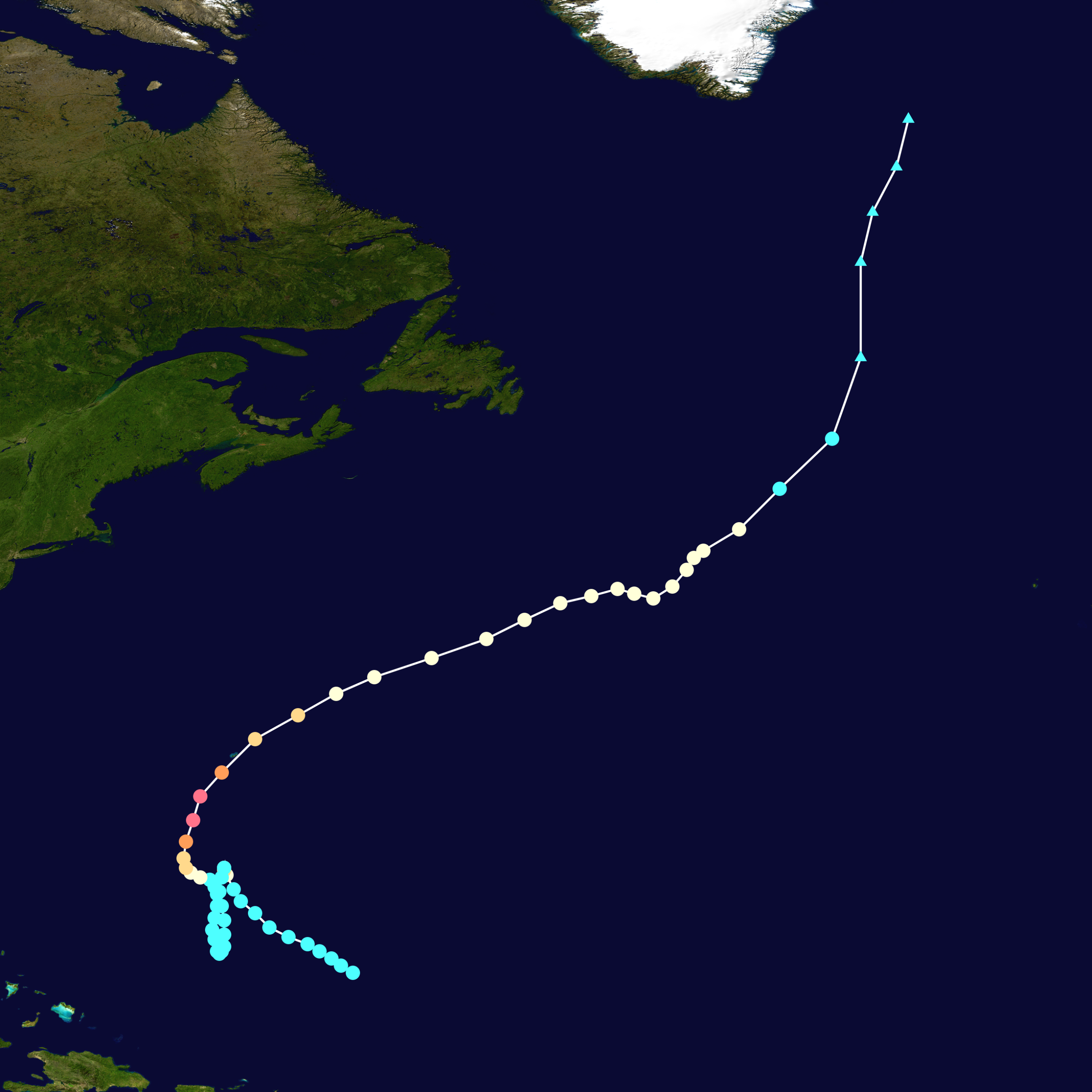
- Duration: October 4 – October 18
- Peak intensity: 140 mph (220 km/h) (1-min); 950 mbar (hPa)

A tropical wave developed into Tropical Storm Nicole about 530 mi (850 km) northeast of San Juan, Puerto Rico, early on October 4, based on an ASCAT pass revealing a well-defined surface circulation and winds of up to 50 mph (80 km/h). The NHC forecast only gradual strengthening as the storm moved slowly to the north due to weak steering currents. An eye then became visible at both mid- and upper-level heights, and Nicole rapidly strengthened to a Category 2 hurricane to the south of Bermuda, as winds reached 105 mph (170 km/h) early on October 7. With Matthew located offshore Florida, this was the first time since 1964 that two hurricanes at or above Category 2 existed simultaneously in the western Atlantic Ocean (65°W). However, Nicole was then impacted by wind shear, with the eye soon becoming no longer visible and convection diminishing. Nicole rapidly weakened to a strong tropical storm on October 7. Further weakening occurred as it drifted southward, and by October 8, the circulation was exposed and the system was barely a tropical storm, with all convection displaced to the south. Later that day, an impressive burst of convection flared up over the center, and Nicole again became more organized as it began to turn to the north.

Gradual intensification continued throughout the next few days before briefly stopping, then later resuming on October 11 as the storm turned towards Bermuda and re-strengthened to Category 1 status. On October 12, Nicole became a Category 2 hurricane again. Later on the same day, Nicole became a major hurricane upon reaching Category 3 intensity. The next day, Nicole briefly strengthened into a Category 4 hurricane, peaking with maximum sustained winds of 140 mph (225 km/h). However, the storm weakened back to a Category 3 hurricane several hours later due to increasing vertical wind shear. At 15:00 UTC on October 13, the hurricane's eye passed directly over Bermuda, where automated surface station measured sustained winds of 87 mph (140 km/h) and a gust reaching 119 mph (192 km/h). At 06:00 UTC on October 14, southwesterly wind shear reduced the system to Category 1 status. The storm slowly began to weaken the next day, falling to a tropical storm intensity early on October 18. Nicole transitioned into an extratropical cyclone at 06:00 UTC later that day.

Overall, Nicole was responsible for $15 million in damages across Bermuda. Along the East Coast of the United States, a swimmer in North Carolina drowned due to rip currents produced by Nicole.

=== Hurricane Otto ===
- Category 3 hurricane (SSHWS)
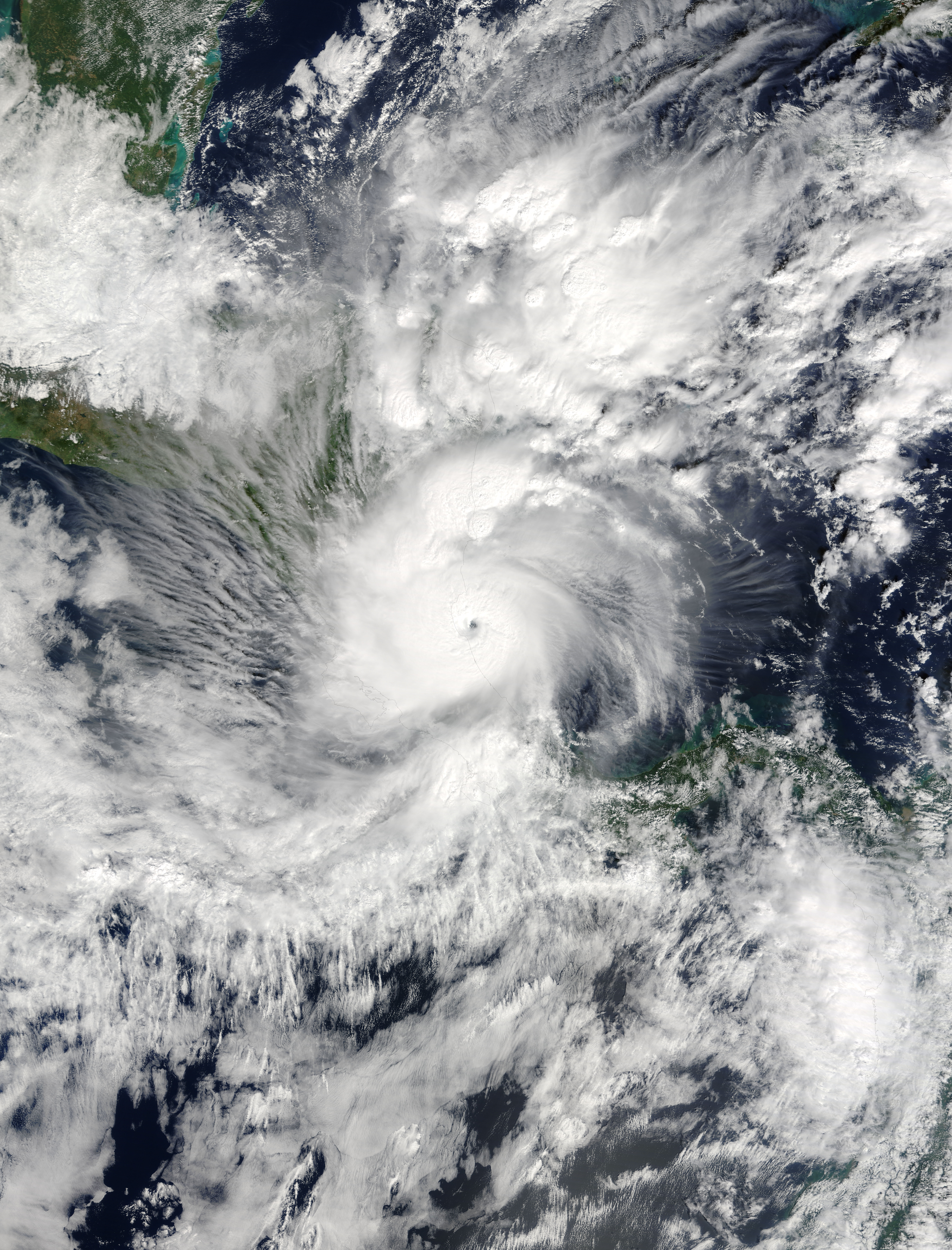
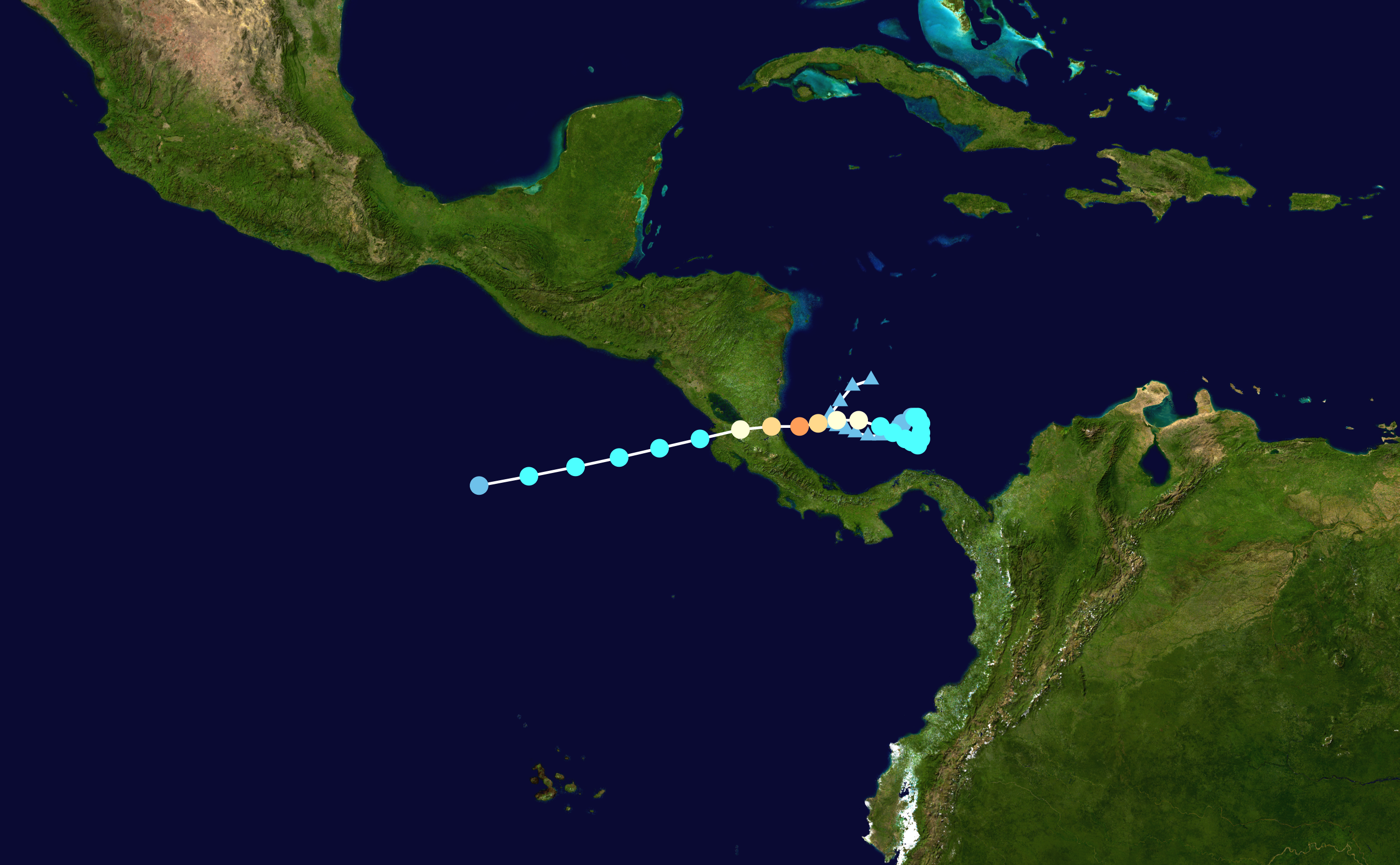
- Duration: November 20 – November 25 (Exited basin)
- Peak intensity: 115 mph (185 km/h) (1-min); 975 mbar (hPa)

On November 15, a broad low-pressure area developed in the southwestern Caribbean Sea. After an increase in convective organization, the system developed into a tropical depression about 120 mi (190 km) north of Colón, Panama late on November 20. Fueled by warm waters and good outflow, the depression intensified into Tropical Storm Otto by 06:00 UTC on November 21. Otto deepened into a hurricane on November 23 while drifting westward; this was the latest date for a tropical cyclone to reach that intensity over the Caribbean Sea, one day later than the previous record set by Hurricane Martha in 1969. Otto rapidly intensified throughout the following day, and at 17:30 UTC November 24, the storm made landfall on the southern Nicaragua coast near San Juan de Nicaragua at peak intensity, as a Category 3 hurricane with winds of 115 mph (185 km/h). This was the southernmost hurricane landfall in Central America. Weakening ensued as Otto moved inland. Around 03:30 UTC on November 25, Otto exited into the Eastern Pacific, marking the first time a tropical cyclone survived the crossover from the Atlantic to the Eastern Pacific since Hurricane Cesar–Douglas in 1996.

In Panama, the outer bands of Otto brought heavy precipitation and strong winds. The hurricane left nine deaths in the country, with one after a house was struck by a falling tree in Panama City, three from landslides, two by drowning in a rain-swollen river, and three others after the ship Jessica sank. Generally, rainfall of 3 to 6 in (76 to 152 mm) was observed in Nicaragua. Throughout the country, Otto damaged 857 houses, 8 schools, and 2 health facilities. About 5,600 ft (1,700 m) of power lines were damaged, causing power and water outages. Four deaths were reported. In Costa Rica, rainfall peaked at 12.11 in (308 mm) at Miravalles Volcano. Flooding and mudslides left 42 communities isolated and damaged 14 water systems. Damage reached at least $190 million and there were 10 fatalities.

== Storm names ==
The following list of names was used for named storms that formed in the North Atlantic in 2016. This was the same list used in the 2010 season, with the exceptions of Ian and Tobias, which replaced Igor and Tomas, respectively. The name Ian was used for the first time in 2016.

- Alex
- Bonnie
- Colin
- Danielle
- Earl
- Fiona
- Gaston
- Hermine
- Ian
- Julia
- Karl
- Lisa
- Matthew
- Nicole
- Otto
- Paula (unused)
- Richard (unused)
- Shary (unused)
- Tobias (unused)
- Virginie (unused)
- Walter (unused)

=== Retirement ===
On March 26, 2017, at the 39th session of the RA IV hurricane committee, the World Meteorological Organization retired the names Matthew and Otto from its rotating name lists due to the number of deaths and amount of damage each one caused, and they will not be used again in the North Atlantic basin. They were replaced with Martin and Owen, respectively, when the list was used again for the 2022 season.

== Season effects ==
This is a table of all of the storms that formed in the 2016 Atlantic hurricane season. It includes their name, duration, peak classification and intensities, areas affected, damage, and death totals. Deaths in parentheses are additional and indirect (an example of an indirect death would be a traffic accident), but were still related to that storm. Damage and deaths include totals while the storm was extratropical, a wave, or a low, and all of the damage figures are in 2016 USD.

Saffir–Simpson scale
TD	TS	C1	C2	C3	C4	C5

2016 North Atlantic tropical cyclone season statistics
Storm name	Dates active	Storm category at peak intensity	Max 1-min wind mph (km/h)	Min. press. (mbar)	Areas affected	Damage (US$)	Deaths	Ref(s).
Alex	January 12–15	Category 1 hurricane	85 (140)	981	The Bahamas, Bermuda, Azores, Southern Greenland	Minimal	(1)	
Bonnie	May 27 – June 4	Tropical storm	45 (75)	1006	The Bahamas, Southeastern United States	$640,000	2	
Colin	June 5–7	Tropical storm	50 (85)	1001	Yucatán Peninsula, Greater Antilles, East Coast of the United States	$1.04 million	6	
Danielle	June 19–21	Tropical storm	45 (75)	1007	Yucatán Peninsula, Eastern Mexico	Minimal	1	
Earl	August 2–6	Category 1 hurricane	85 (140)	979	Lesser Antilles, Greater Antilles, Central America, East Mexico	$250 million	94	
Fiona	August 16–23	Tropical storm	50 (85)	1004	None	None	None	
Gaston	August 22 – September 2	Category 3 hurricane	120 (195)	955	Azores	None	None	
Eight	August 28 – September 1	Tropical depression	35 (55)	1010	North Carolina	None	None	
Hermine	August 28 – September 3	Category 1 hurricane	80 (130)	981	Greater Antilles, Gulf Coast of the United States, The Bahamas, East Coast of the United States, Atlantic Canada	$550 million	4 (1)	
Ian	September 12–16	Tropical storm	60 (95)	994	None	None	None	
Julia	September 13–18	Tropical storm	50 (85)	1007	Southeastern United States	$6.13 million	None	
Karl	September 14–25	Tropical storm	70 (110)	988	Cape Verde, Bermuda	Minimal	None	
Lisa	September 19–25	Tropical storm	50 (85)	999	None	None	None	
Matthew	September 28 – October 9	Category 5 hurricane	165 (270)	934	Windward Islands, Leeward Antilles, South America, Greater Antilles, Lucayan Archipelago, Southeastern United States, Atlantic Canada	$16.5 billion	714 (17)	
Nicole	October 4–18	Category 4 hurricane	140 (220)	950	Bermuda	$15 million	1	
Otto	November 20–25	Category 3 hurricane	115 (185)	975	Central America	≥ $192.2 million	23	
Season aggregates
16 systems	January 12 – November 25		165 (270)	934		≥ $17.5 billion	845 (19)	

== See also ==
- Weather of 2016
- Tropical cyclones in 2016
- 2016 Pacific hurricane season
- 2016 Pacific typhoon season
- 2016 North Indian Ocean cyclone season
- South-West Indian Ocean cyclone seasons: 2015–16, 2016–17
- Australian region cyclone seasons: 2015–16, 2016–17
- South Pacific cyclone seasons: 2015–16, 2016–17
- South Atlantic tropical cyclone
- Mediterranean tropical-like cyclone
