= Tropical Storm Bonnie (2016) =

Atlantic tropical storm

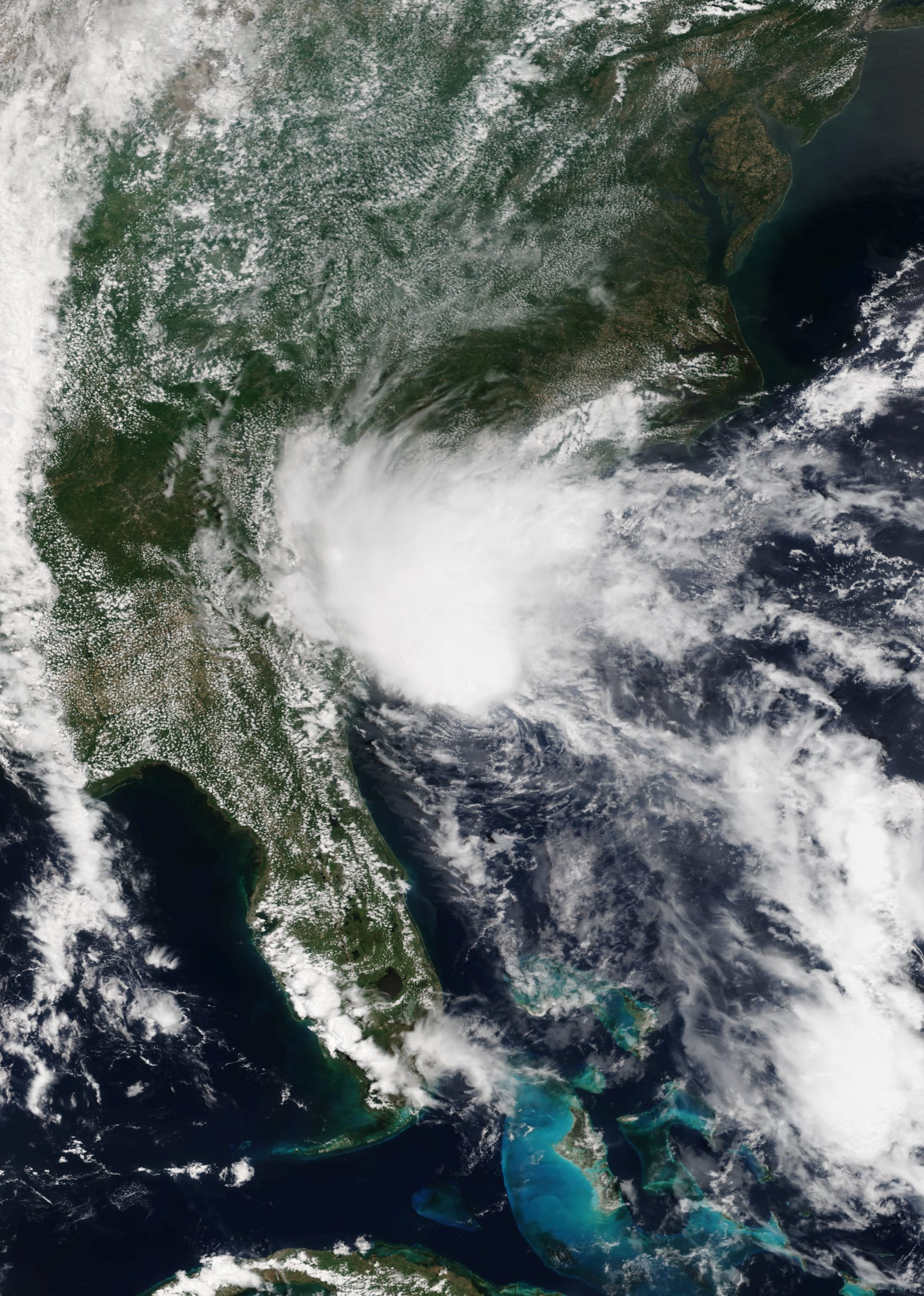
- Tropical Storm Bonnie at its initial peak intensity late on May 28

Meteorological history
- Formed: May 27, 2016
- Remnant low: June 4, 2016
- Dissipated: June 9, 2016

Tropical storm
- 1-minute sustained (SSHWS/NWS)
- Highest winds: 45 mph (75 km/h)
- Lowest pressure: 1006 mbar (hPa); 29.71 inHg

Overall effects
- Fatalities: 2 direct
- Damage: $640,000 (2016 USD)
- Areas affected: The Bahamas; Southeastern United States
- IBTrACS
- Part of the 2016 Atlantic hurricane season

Tropical Storm Bonnie was a weak but persistent tropical cyclone that brought heavy rain to the Southeastern United States in May 2016. The second storm of the 2016 Atlantic hurricane season, Bonnie formed from an area of low pressure northeast of the Bahamas on May 27, a few days before the official hurricane season began on June 1. Moving steadily west-northwestwards, Bonnie intensified into a tropical storm on May 28 and attained peak winds six hours later. However, due to hostile environmental conditions, Bonnie weakened to a depression hours before making landfall just east of Charleston, South Carolina, on May 29. Steering currents collapsed afterwards, causing the storm to meander over South Carolina for two days. The storm weakened further into a post-tropical cyclone on May 31, before emerging off the coast while moving generally east-northeastwards. On June 2, Bonnie regenerated into a tropical depression just offshore North Carolina as conditions became slightly more favorable. The next day, despite increasing wind shear and cooling sea surface temperatures, Bonnie reintensified into a tropical storm and reached its peak intensity. The storm hung on to tropical storm strength for another day, before weakening into a depression late on June 4 and became a post-tropical cyclone early the next day.

Lingering over South Carolina for a few days, Bonnie brought heavy rains and widespread floods to the Southeastern United States. Rainfall totals hit 6 inches (150 mm) in much of South Carolina, and exceeded 10 in (250 mm) in some areas. Flooding resulted in the closure of the southbound lanes of Interstate 95 in Jasper County, and also inundated the Jasper County Sheriff's Office and Detention Center. In Ridgeland, several buildings were damaged and the local wastewater treatment plant overflowed, spilling discharge into the nearby Captain Bill Creek. Damage in this county alone exceeded $640,000 (2016 USD). Record-breaking rainfall was observed across much of the Outer Banks; on Hatteras Island, Cape Point Campground was closed for a week due to flooding. Two people drowned in rip currents along the coastline of the Southeast United States.

== Meteorological history ==
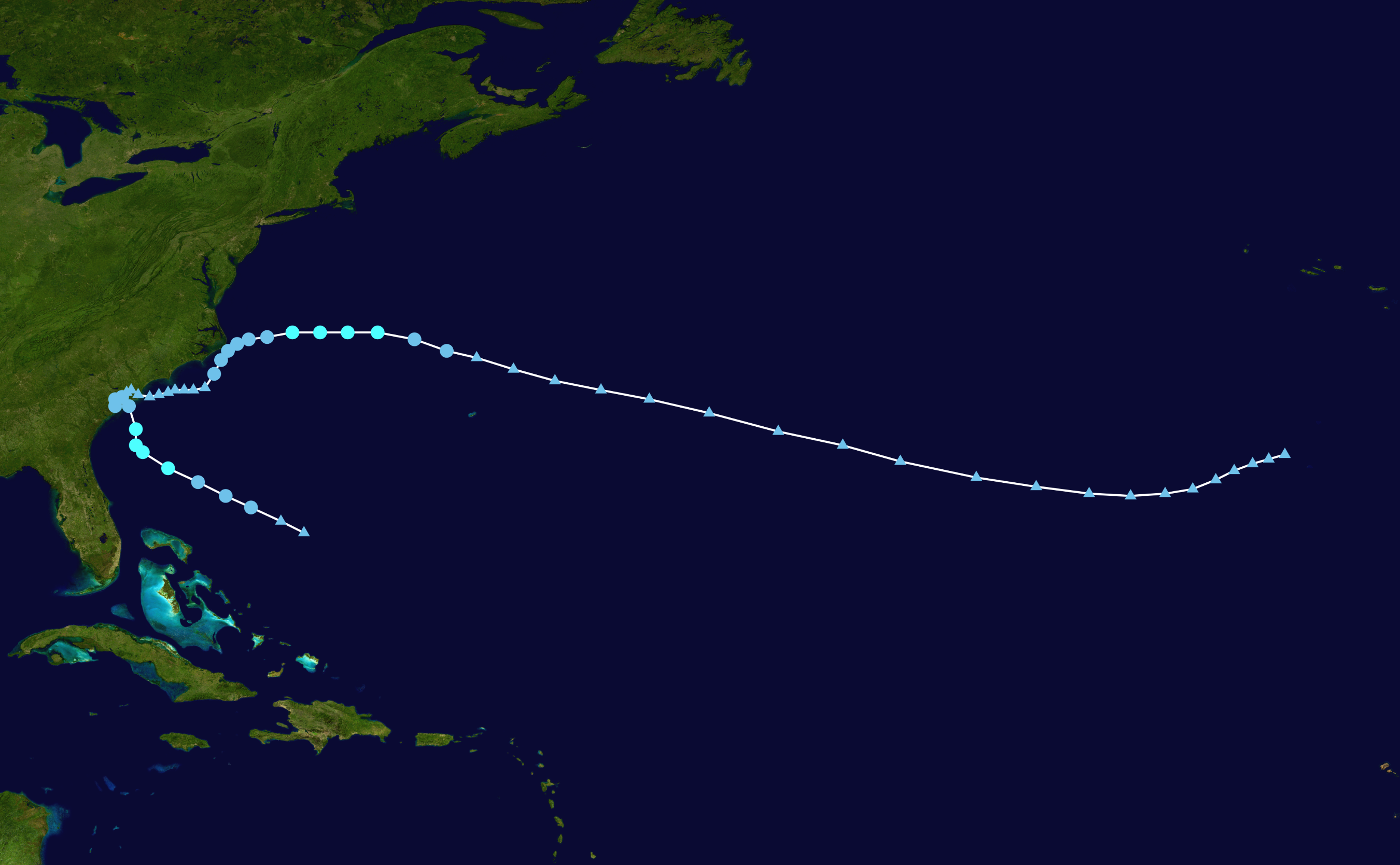
Map plotting the storm's track and intensity, according to the Saffir–Simpson scale Map key Saffir–Simpson scale Tropical depression (≤38 mph, ≤62 km/h) Tropical storm (39–73 mph, 63–118 km/h) Category 1 (74–95 mph, 119–153 km/h) Category 2 (96–110 mph, 154–177 km/h) Category 3 (111–129 mph, 178–208 km/h) Category 4 (130–156 mph, 209–251 km/h) Category 5 (≥157 mph, ≥252 km/h) Unknown Storm type Tropical cyclone Subtropical cyclone Extratropical cyclone, remnant low, tropical disturbance, or monsoon depression

On May 24, the National Hurricane Center (NHC) began monitoring an area of disturbed weather resulting from the interaction of a weakening cold front and an upper-level trough. A surface area of low pressure formed late the next day, and the low eventually gained sufficient organization to be declared a tropical depression at 18:00 UTC on May 27. At the time, the depression was located about 435 miles (700 km) southeast of Charleston, South Carolina, and moving west-northwestwards in response to a low over the northwestern Bahamas and a ridge near the coast of North Carolina. Strong vertical wind shear and dry air in the region hindered strengthening, however, the depression was located over the warm waters of the Gulf Stream. In the afternoon of May 28, a burst of deep convection developed near the northwestern part of the exposed low-level circulation center (LLCC), and the NHC upgraded the depression to Tropical Storm Bonnie.

Despite strong southerly wind shear exposing the LLCC, Bonnie intensified slightly to reach its initial peak intensity with winds of 45 mph (72 km/h) as it turned towards the north. However, the continued effects of high wind shear and dry air caused the cyclone's appearance to significantly degrade early on May 29, as deep convection dissipated due to more than 46 mph (74 km/h) of southerly shear. Bonnie weakened back to tropical depression strength about half an hour prior to its landfall just east of Charleston, South Carolina. Caught in weak steering currents, the depression meandered over South Carolina for over a day before degenerating to a remnant low over the northeastern portion of the state at 12:00 UTC on May 30.

The remnant circulation continued to move slowly and erratically as it emerged off the coast on May 31, before accelerating east-northeastwards and reintensifying slightly. Amidst light wind shear and high sea surface temperatures (SSTs), organization improved as convection persisted near the center, and Bonnie regenerated into a tropical depression at 00:00 UTC on June 2. The next day, despite worsening conditions, a burst of convection around the center led to Bonnie restrengthening into a tropical storm, simultaneously attaining a new minimum pressure of 1,006 mbar (1,006 hPa; 29.7 inHg). Increasing northwesterly shear and cooling SSTs soon became evident as the LLCC became exposed to the west, however Bonnie continued to maintain tropical storm strength. On the afternoon of June 4, Bonnie began to succumb to the unfavorable conditions, and the storm weakened into a tropical depression. Early the next day, Bonnie degenerated once more into a post-tropical cyclone as it tracked east-southeastward over the Atlantic Ocean. The storm eventually transitioned to an extratropical cyclone on June 7, and eventually dissipated south-southwest of the Azores, just after 18:00 UTC on June 9.

== Preparations, impact, and records ==
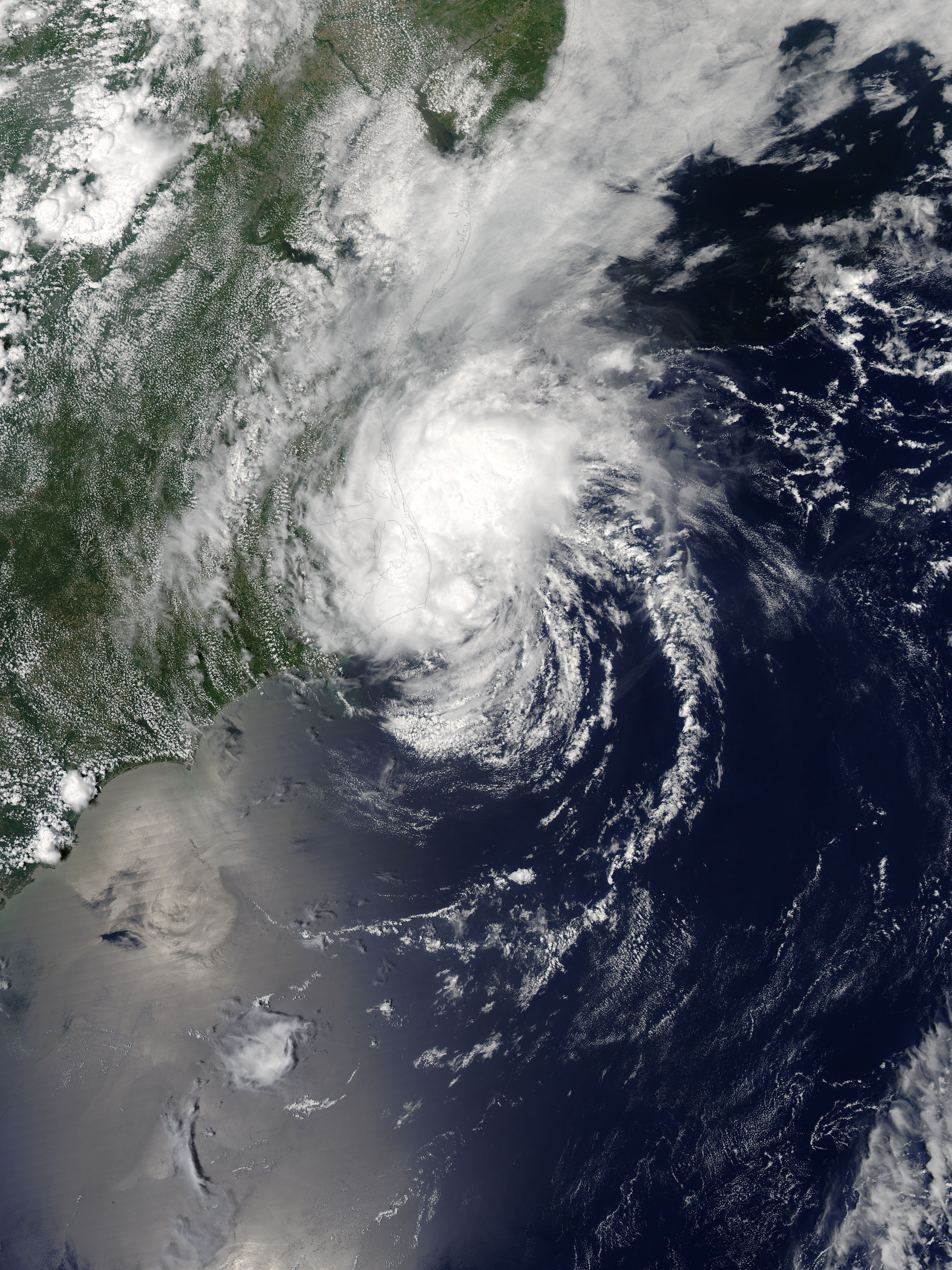
Bonnie regenerating near North Carolina on June 2

Upon formation, a tropical storm warning was issued, covering the Savannah River to the Little River Inlet in South Carolina. These were discontinued when Bonnie weakened to a depression at 8:00 a.m. EDT (12:00 UTC) on May 29. Total rainfall accumulations in South Carolina from Bonnie peaked at 10.43 inches (265 mm) in Ridgeland. The heavy rains affected several coastal businesses expecting high numbers of tourists over the Memorial Day weekend. The heavy rains led to significant flooding, prompting the South Carolina Highway Patrol to close at least seven roads in Jasper County, including the southbound lanes of Interstate 95. Other road closures occurred in Dorchester and Hampton counties, after flooding rendered them impassible. Across Jasper County, four buildings sustained major damage and ten others experienced minor damage, primarily within the town of Ridgeland. Water inundated both the Jasper County Sheriff's Office and Detention Center, prompting the relocation of one-third of its inmates. Ridgeland's wastewater treatment plant overflowed, spilling 75,000 to 100,000 gallons (280,000 to 380,000 liters) of discharge into the nearby Captain Bill Creek. Bonnie is estimated to have caused about $640,000 (2016 USD) worth of damage in Jasper County alone, mainly in Ridgeland. At Charleston International Airport, a sustained wind of 31 mph (50 km/h) and a gust to 40 mph (64 km/h) were observed; these were the highest recorded windspeeds related to the cyclone on land.

In Georgia, precipitation reached 7.74 in (197 mm) at Oliver. In Bulloch County, several roads were inundated or closed due to high water. Some ponds exceeded their banks. Heavy rainfall, record-breaking in some areas, was observed in much of the Outer Banks of North Carolina. Precipitation peaked at 8.21 in (209 mm) at the Billy Mitchell Airport in Hatteras. At that location, 7.09 in (180 mm) of rain fell on May 30, breaking the old record set in 1940. Furthermore, a new monthly rainfall record for the month of May was observed—12.67 in (322 mm) of rain fell during that month. At least 7 in (180 mm) of rain fell on Hatteras Island, resulting in the closure of Cape Point Campground and its online reservation system for a week. Several beach ramps were inundated with at least 6 in (150 mm) of standing water and some were rendered impassible, however none were closed. Tropical Storm Colin would later combine with Bonnie to produce at least 10 in (250 mm) of standing water in farmlands in Hyde and Beaufort counties, damaging newly planted crops. Further north, Bonnie dumped 1.65 in (42 mm) of rain in New York City, resulting in several disabled vehicles and flooded roadways.

Swells generated by Bonnie created an elevated risk of rip currents along the coastline of the Southeastern United States. Several water rescues were carried out. A 21-year-old man went missing at Carolina Beach on May 28; his body was recovered in New Hanover County, North Carolina, three days later. Further south, the body of a 20-year-old man was recovered in Brevard County, Florida, after he drowned.

When Bonnie formed on May 27, it became the first occurrence of two pre-season Atlantic storms since 2012, and only the second occurrence since 1951 (the third occurring in 2020). The first storm, Alex, had formed in January.

== See also ==
- List of off-season Atlantic hurricanes
- Other storms of the same name
- Timeline of the 2016 Atlantic hurricane season
- Tropical Storm Beryl (2012)
- Tropical Storm Ana (2015)
- Tropical Storm Bertha (2020)
