= Tropical Storm Beryl (2012) =

Atlantic tropical storm

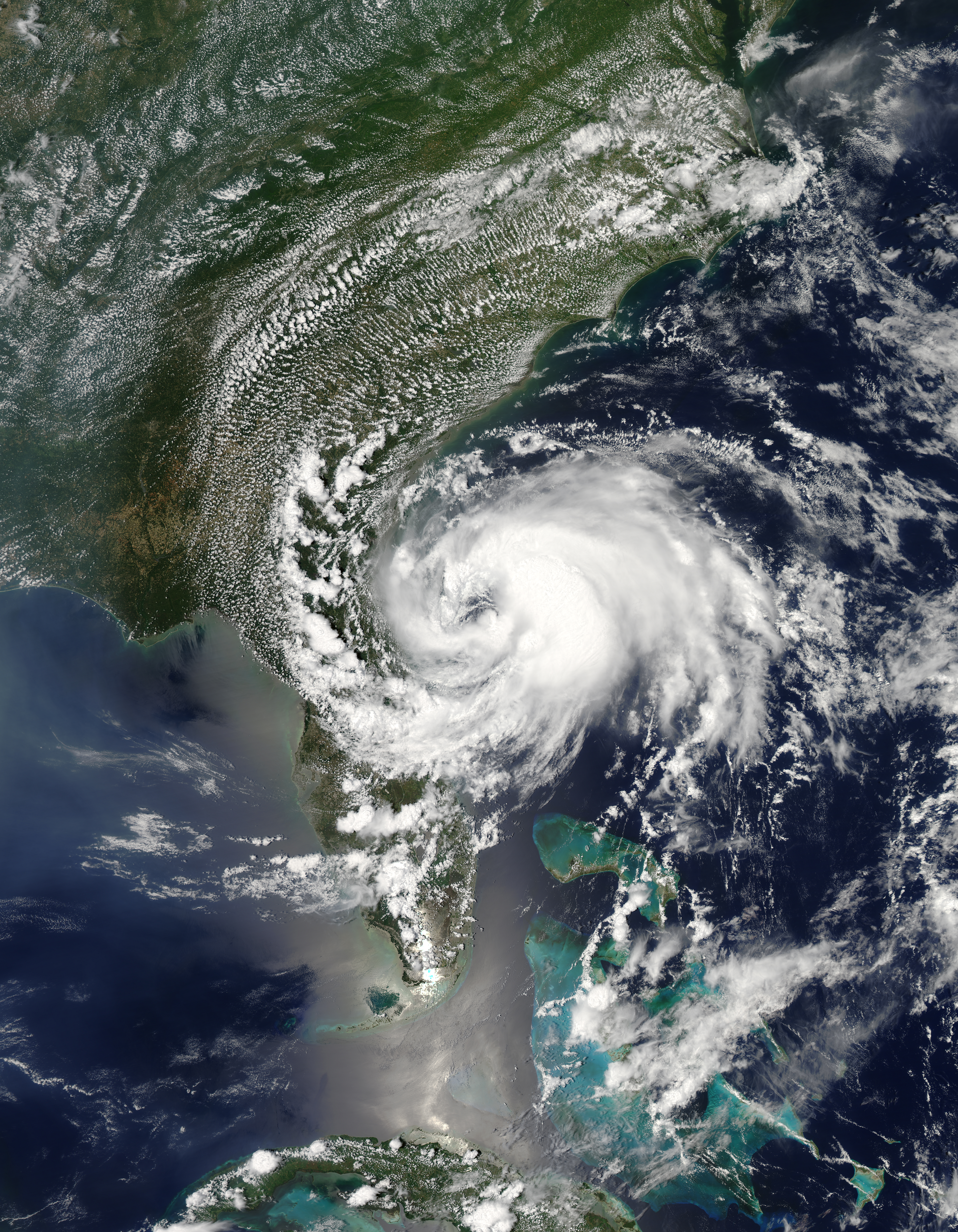
- Tropical Storm Beryl approaching Florida on May 27

Meteorological history
- Formed: May 26, 2012
- Extratropical: May 30, 2012
- Dissipated: June 2, 2012

Tropical storm
- 1-minute sustained (SSHWS/NWS)
- Highest winds: 70 mph (110 km/h)
- Lowest pressure: 992 mbar (hPa); 29.29 inHg

Overall effects
- Fatalities: 1 direct, 2 indirect
- Damage: $148,000 (2012 USD)
- Areas affected: Cuba, The Bahamas, Southeastern United States
- IBTrACS
- Part of the 2012 Atlantic hurricane season

Tropical Storm Beryl was the strongest off-season Atlantic tropical cyclone on record to make landfall in the United States. The second tropical cyclone of the 2012 Atlantic hurricane season, Beryl developed on May 26 from a low-pressure system offshore North Carolina. Initially subtropical, the storm slowly acquired tropical characteristics as it tracked across warmer sea surface temperatures and within an environment of decreasing vertical wind shear. Late on May 27, Beryl transitioned into a tropical cyclone less than 120 miles (190 km) from North Florida. Early the following day, the storm moved ashore near Jacksonville Beach, Florida, with peak winds of 65 mph (100 km/h). It quickly weakened to a tropical depression, dropping heavy rainfall while moving slowly across the southeastern United States. A cold front turned Beryl to the northeast, and the storm became extratropical on May 30.

The precursor to Beryl produced heavy rainfall in Cuba, causing flooding, mudslides and two deaths. Torrential rain also affected south Florida and the Bahamas. After forming, Beryl produced rough surf along the southeastern U.S. coast, leaving one person from Folly Beach, South Carolina missing. Upon making landfall in Florida, the storm produced strong winds that left 38,000 people without power. High rains alleviated drought conditions and put out wildfires along the storm's path. A fallen tree killed a man driving in Orangeburg County, South Carolina. In Carteret County, North Carolina, Beryl spawned an EF1 tornado that snapped trees and damaged dozens of homes near Peletier. Overall damage was minor, estimated at $148,000. (Note: All damage totals are in 2012 United States dollars.)

== Meteorological history ==
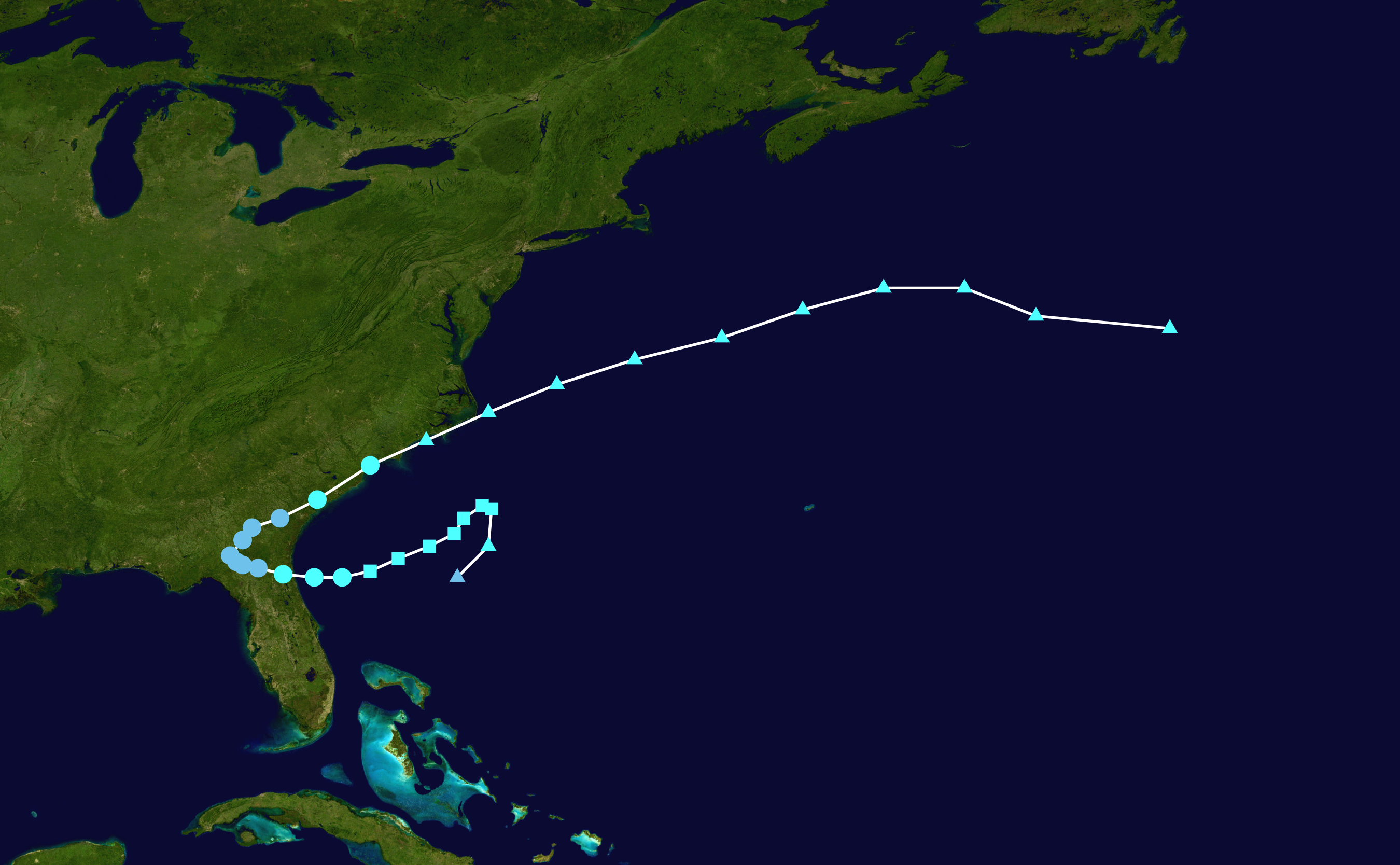
Map plotting the storm's track and intensity, according to the Saffir–Simpson scale Map key Saffir–Simpson scale Tropical depression (≤38 mph, ≤62 km/h) Tropical storm (39–73 mph, 63–118 km/h) Category 1 (74–95 mph, 119–153 km/h) Category 2 (96–110 mph, 154–177 km/h) Category 3 (111–129 mph, 178–208 km/h) Category 4 (130–156 mph, 209–251 km/h) Category 5 (≥157 mph, ≥252 km/h) Unknown Storm type Tropical cyclone Subtropical cyclone Extratropical cyclone, remnant low, tropical disturbance, or monsoon depression

The origins of Beryl were from a trough that developed over the Yucatán Peninsula on May 16. It drifted eastward into the northwestern Caribbean Sea, spawning a low pressure area on May 18. For the next three days, it remained nearly stationary without development, until the system became better defined on May 22 when it began moving to the northeast. On May 23, the elongated low had an area of disorganized convection. While passing over the Cuban Island of Isla de la Juventud, an exposed center of circulation and transient convection was noted due to the effects of high wind shear across the region. The next day, the system moved through the Florida Keys, and the National Hurricane Center (NHC) noted the potential for increasingly favorable conditions over the next two days. The low became better defined as its cloud pattern consolidated. It moved further into the western Atlantic over the next 24 hours, and a band of convection extended across the Bahamas and Cuba to wrap around the southwestern edge of the circulation. On May 25, the system interacted with a mid- to upper-level low, causing the center to reform further to the northeast. After the system attained gale-force winds near the center and sufficiently organized convection, the NHC initiated advisories on Subtropical Storm Beryl at 0300 UTC on May 26, while the cyclone was 305 mi (490 km) east of Charleston, South Carolina. Post-season analysis indicated that Beryl developed three hours prior.

Beryl re-strengthening over the Carolinas on May 30

Following Beryl's formation, there was a receding trough over New England that initially created a weak steering environment. Marginally warm waters and dry air were expected to prevent significant intensification, and convection remained minimal through May 26. Later that day, a building ridge caused Beryl to begin a steady southwest motion. By that time, the low-level center became vertically aligned with the upper-level center. The environment near the storm's center became moister and the system began to pass over warmer sea surface temperatures, allowing convection to increase. On May 27, the storm began a transition into a tropical cyclone, which it completed by 1800 UTC that day. As Beryl approached northeastern Florida, it became better organized, with increased convection in bands around the center. Late on May 27, the Hurricane Hunters observed flight-level winds of 92 mph (148 km/h), suggesting maximum sustained winds of 70 mph (110 km/h); this would be Beryl's peak intensity. It is possible, however, that Beryl briefly reached hurricane intensity early in the evening of May 27 based on Doppler weather radar velocities, although the data is inconclusive according to the post-season report. At roughly 0410 UTC on May 28 (just after midnight local time), the storm made landfall near Jacksonville Beach, Florida, with winds of about 65 mph (105 km/h) after weakening slightly on the final approach.

After moving ashore, Beryl quickly weakened to a tropical depression. It slowed due to the weakening ridge to its north, and an approaching cold front turned it to the north and northeast on May 29. Despite being well inland, Beryl retained enough convection to remain a tropical cyclone. As Beryl approached the Atlantic Ocean on May 30, its convection increased to the south and east of the center, although the intrusion of dry air resulted in a ragged appearance on satellite imagery. Based on reports from ships, Beryl was upgraded to a tropical storm on May 30 near the South Carolina coastline. The approaching front caused the storm to accelerate northeastward. Beryl's circulation became elongated and its associated convection spread northward, suggesting the transition into an extratropical cyclone. By late on May 30, Beryl became extratropical, prompting the NHC to discontinue advisories. The storm continued to the northeast, later turning to the east-southeast. On June 2, a larger extratropical storm absorbed the remnants of Beryl to the southeast of Newfoundland.

== Preparations, impact, and records ==
When Beryl made landfall in Jacksonville Beach, Florida with 65 mph (105 km/h), it became the strongest tropical cyclone at landfall in the U.S. outside of the official Atlantic hurricane season. Beryl was also the second tropical storm to form before the start of the season, which marked only the fourth of six such occurrences since records began in 1851; the other five occurrences were in 1887, 1908, 1951, 2016, and 2020.

=== Cuba and The Bahamas ===
Before becoming a tropical cyclone, Beryl produced heavy rainfall over Cuba, especially Sancti Spíritus Province, where rainfall peaked at 21.93 in (557 mm). The rains caused mudslides and forced more than 8,500 people to evacuate their homes. Two people died after trying to cross flooded rivers. Flooding damaged 1,109 houses and destroyed 47 others. Although the rains flooded widespread areas of crop fields, the precipitation was beneficial in refilling reservoirs in drought-struck areas of the country.

A band of thunderstorms and heavy rainfall moved across The Bahamas and dropped about 9.7 in (250 mm) of precipitation in Freeport, Grand Bahama. Low-lying areas in New Providence experienced flooding. Residents reported that a tornado touched down in Murphy Town, Abaco, downing power and telephone lines, overturning vehicles and damaging the roofs of three buildings. Rain from the system also affected the Berry Islands, Abaco, and Bimini, as well as several smaller island groups.

=== Florida ===
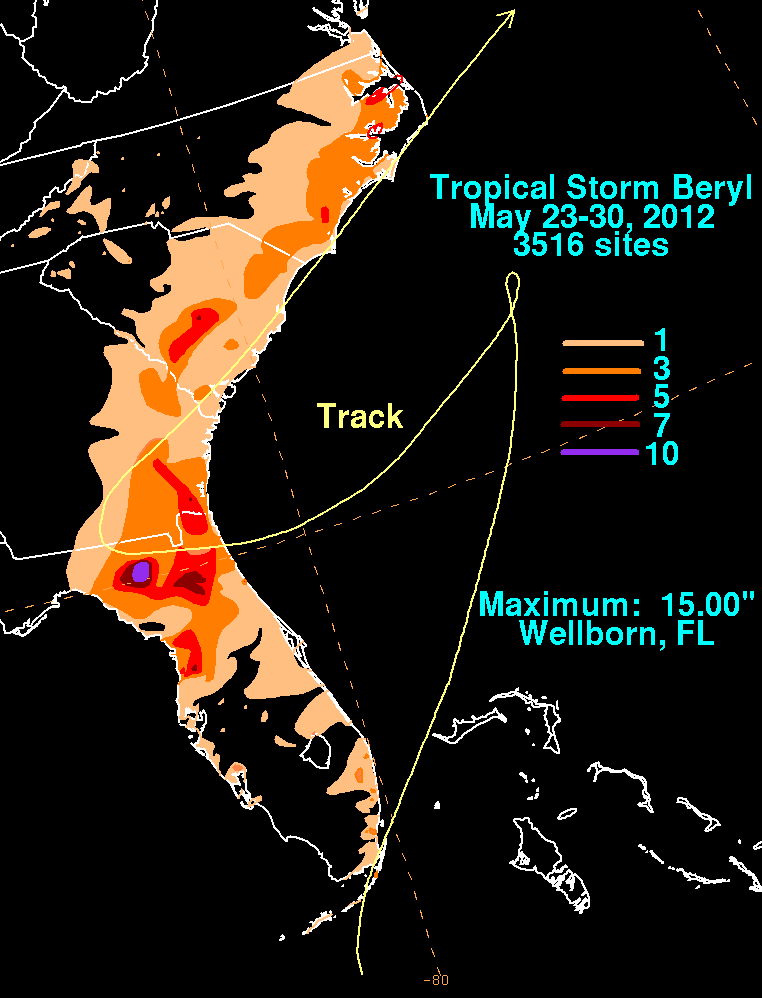
Storm total rainfall produced by Tropical Storm Beryl across the Southeast United States

Prior to being classified as a tropical cyclone, the precursor to Beryl produced locally heavy rainfall in South Florida, reaching 9.7 in (250 mm) at Miami International Airport. The total was the second highest daily rainfall ever recorded in the month of May at the station. The rain caused extensive street flooding, especially in Sweetwater and Doral, stranding drivers and afternoon commuters. Miami Dade College was forced to cancel morning classes on May 23.

When the NHC issued their first advisory, the agency also issued a tropical storm warning from the Brevard/Volusia county line in Florida to Edisto Beach, South Carolina. A tropical storm watch was issued northward to the mouth of the Santee River in South Carolina. A state of emergency was issued in Jacksonville, Florida, causing the early ending of a jazz festival and Memorial Day events. When Beryl moved ashore, airports around Jacksonville canceled all flights except for JetBlue Airways and Delta Air Lines.

A teenager died in high seas in Daytona Beach, Florida. High surf and rip currents caused lifeguards in the region to restrict swimming in the ocean. The highest storm surge was 3.73 ft (1.14 m) at Fernandina Beach. When the storm moved ashore, Beryl produced strong winds along the coast, peaking at 54 mph (87 km/h) at Huguenot Park in Jacksonville; nearby Buck Island reported a peak wind gust of 72 mph (117 km/h). The winds prompted the Mathews Bridge and Wonderwood Bridge to close. Toppled power lines left about 38,000 residences in Jacksonville without power. In Jacksonville, flash flooding affected areas along Hogans Creek, and waves damaged a seawall and some docks. The waters entered a condominium and three vehicles. Flash flooding covered a portion of U.S. Route 129 in Suwannee County. Damage in Jacksonville was estimated at $20,000. South of Jacksonville, the outer circulation of Beryl spawned a short-lived EF0 tornado in Port Saint Lucie that caused minor damage to two homes. Damage from the tornado was estimated at $20,000. Another tornado was reported in Yankeetown. Due to its slow motion, Beryl dropped heavy rainfall across Florida, peaking at 15.0 in (380 mm) in Wellborn. Just South of Wellborn, a motorcyclist in Taylor County, Florida was killed when a car hydroplaned on the flooded highway and struck him head-on. First responders noted that it took them 20 minutes to cover the ten miles due to the nonexistent visibility. Gainesville reported 3.25 in (83 mm) on May 28, which broke the previous daily rainfall record. Hernando County Airport broke its daily rainfall record on May 29 with a total of 3.65 in (93 mm), which was also the greatest daily rainfall to date in 2012. The rains extinguished 80 percent of the 25 wildfires in northern Florida. In Levy County, a waterspout dissipated while moving onshore. The high rains flooded several homes in Citrus County, causing about $108,000 in damage.

=== Georgia, South Carolina, and North Carolina ===
Hours before the storm moved ashore on May 27, officials in Cumberland Island, Georgia mandated that all campers evacuate the island. Although the storm made landfall in Florida, its storm surge flooded portions of St. Marys, Georgia. Rainfall in the state peaked at 7.04 in (179 mm) at Woodbine. Beryl's rainfall was beneficial in alleviating drought conditions, despite causing some minor flooding. Wind gusts along the Georgia coastline peaked at 55 mph (89 km/h) at Jekyll Island, and sustained tropical force winds extended into the state. Downed trees damaged two homes in McIntosh County, and in Orangeburg County, South Carolina, a falling tree killed a man driving on a state highway. This was the only direct death due to the storm; the others were indirectly related. The highest wind gust in South Carolina was 46 mph (74 km/h) in Fort Johnson, although stronger winds occurred just offshore. Rains in the state peaked at 6.00 in (152 mm) in Jasper County. High tides in Charleston Harbor sank a boat, forcing the crew to be rescued by the Coast Guard. In Folly Beach, South Carolina, one person went missing after swimming in rough surf, but it was not included in the overall death toll. After Beryl began accelerating to the northeast, it dropped heavy rainfall in the Carolinas, causing isolated flooding near Wilmington, North Carolina. Farther north in Peletier, the storm spawned an EF1 tornado on the Enhanced Fujita scale that damaged 67 homes and destroyed 3 others. Moisture from the storm spread northward into Maryland and West Virginia.

== See also ==
- Other storms named Beryl
- List of off-season Atlantic hurricanes
- Tropical Storm Arlene (1959)
- Subtropical Storm Andrea (2007)
- Tropical Storm Ana (2015)
- Tropical Storm Bonnie (2016)
- Tropical Storm Bertha (2020)
- Tropical Storm Danny (2021)
