= Tropical Storm Ana (2015) =

Atlantic tropical storm in 2015

- Tropical Storm Ana approaching South Carolina on May 9

Meteorological history
- Formed: May 8, 2015
- Extratropical: May 11, 2015
- Dissipated: May 12, 2015

Tropical storm
- 1-minute sustained (SSHWS/NWS)
- Highest winds: 60 mph (95 km/h)
- Lowest pressure: 998 mbar (hPa); 29.47 inHg

Overall effects
- Fatalities: 1 direct, 1 indirect
- Damage: $20,000 (2015 USD)
- Areas affected: Southeastern United States
- IBTrACS
- Part of the 2015 Atlantic hurricane season

Tropical Storm Ana was the first named storm of the 2015 Atlantic hurricane season. A pre-season system, it became the earliest United States–landfalling tropical cyclone on record. It developed as a subtropical cyclone from a non-tropical low north of the Bahamas, and intensified to attain peak winds of 60 mph (97 km/h) before transitioning into a fully tropical cyclone early on May 9. Sustained in part by the warm waters of the Gulf Stream, Ana made landfall along the northeast coast of South Carolina early the next morning. Overall, damage from the storm was minor. Heavy rainfall and gusty winds affected parts of the Carolinas, and some vulnerable beaches endured coastal flooding and several feet of erosion. Gusty winds damaged trees and powerlines, causing sporadic power outages, and a weak tornado was reported in association with Ana. In North Carolina, two deaths—one direct and one indirect—were attributed to the storm.

== Meteorological history ==
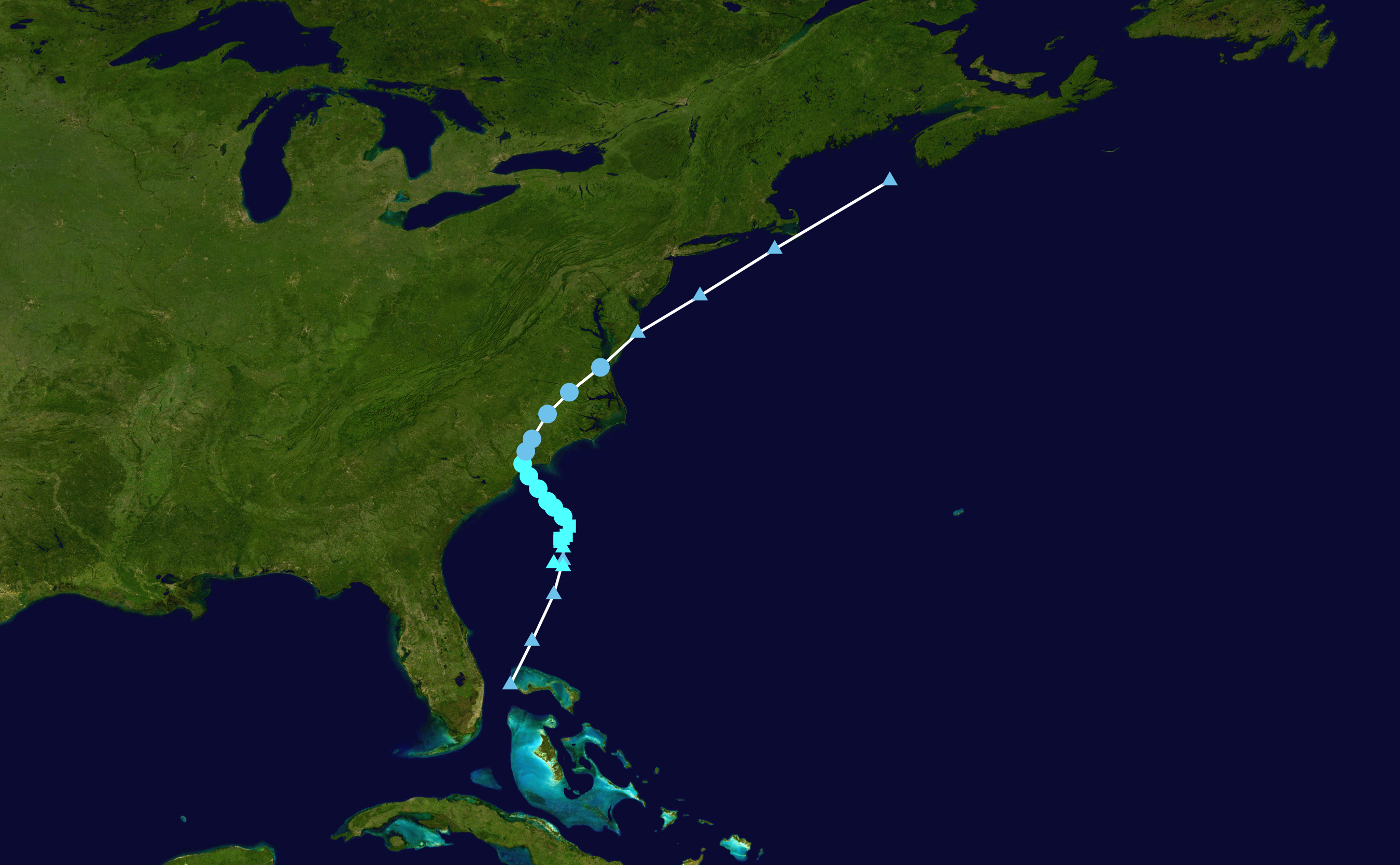
Map plotting the storm's track and intensity, according to the Saffir–Simpson scale Map key Saffir–Simpson scale Tropical depression (≤38 mph, ≤62 km/h) Tropical storm (39–73 mph, 63–118 km/h) Category 1 (74–95 mph, 119–153 km/h) Category 2 (96–110 mph, 154–177 km/h) Category 3 (111–129 mph, 178–208 km/h) Category 4 (130–156 mph, 209–251 km/h) Category 5 (≥157 mph, ≥252 km/h) Unknown Storm type Tropical cyclone Subtropical cyclone Extratropical cyclone, remnant low, tropical disturbance, or monsoon depression

In the first week of May 2015, a strong cold front became stationary to the north of the Greater Antilles, where warm ocean waters dissipated the temperature gradient across the front. The western section of the front drifted westward as a surface trough of low pressure. Arriving at the Bahamas by May 5, the trough was attended by an expanse of showers and thunderstorms extending from the northwestern Caribbean Sea to southern Florida. A sharp mid- to upper-level trough interacted with the system and facilitated gradual cyclogenesis, and early on May 6, a distinct, non-tropical center of low pressure developed off southeastern Florida. Tracking slowly toward the north over the next two days, the system showed signs of increased organization, and a Hurricane Hunter aircraft found tropical storm-force winds to the north and west of the center on May 7. With the development of deep convection, the system was classified Subtropical Storm Ana at 00:00 UTC on May 8, while situated about 170 mi (270 km) to the south-southeast of Myrtle Beach, South Carolina. Due to its involvement with the upper-level trough, as well as its large wind field, the system was considered subtropical, as opposed to fully tropical.

The newly designated storm drifted toward the northwest, caught in an upper-air blocking pattern that yielded weak steering currents. Dry air within its circulation initially kept Ana weak, with sparse thunderstorm activity. However, the warm waters of the Gulf Stream, coupled with atmospheric instability resulting from cold temperatures aloft, enabled the formation of curved banding features near the storm's core. At the same time, the wind field contracted, indicating an imminent transition to a fully tropical storm. Late on May 8, Ana attained its peak intensity with maximum sustained winds of 60 mph (97 km/h) and a minimum central pressure of 998 mbar. By the next morning, most of the convection on the storm's periphery dissipated; with persistent thunderstorms near the center and favorable anticyclonic outflow, Ana became a tropical storm about 130 mi (210 km) to the southeast of Myrtle Beach.

Infrared satellite loop of Ana moving ashore on May 10

Dry air and northwesterly wind shear plagued the system, keeping the strongest thunderstorms confined to the eastern side of the circulation. Despite an improved presentation on satellite and radar imagery on May 9, wind speeds remained about the same. That night, the storm accelerated slightly toward the north-northwest and gradually weakened as it approached land. Diminished by the cooler waters over the continental shelf, Ana made landfall along the coast of South Carolina, near North Myrtle Beach, at around 10:00 UTC on May 10. Over land, the storm turned toward the north in advance of an approaching trough. It weakened to a tropical depression on the afternoon of May 10. The system maintained well-defined rainbands as it curved northeastward, passing through eastern North Carolina and into southeastern Virginia by the evening of May 11. After degenerating into a remnant low by 00:00 UTC on May 12, the system emerged off the coast of the Delmarva Peninsula back into the western Atlantic. Accelerating northeastward, the low passed south of New England and merged with a frontal system near Nova Scotia late on May 12.

== Impact and records ==
Ana was the earliest Atlantic subtropical or tropical cyclone since 2003's Tropical Storm Ana, which formed on April 20. It was also the earliest tropical cyclone on record to make landfall in the United States. A storm in 1952 was thought to have made landfall as a tropical system much earlier, on February 3, but recent reanalysis efforts revealed that the storm was not fully tropical until after clearing Florida.

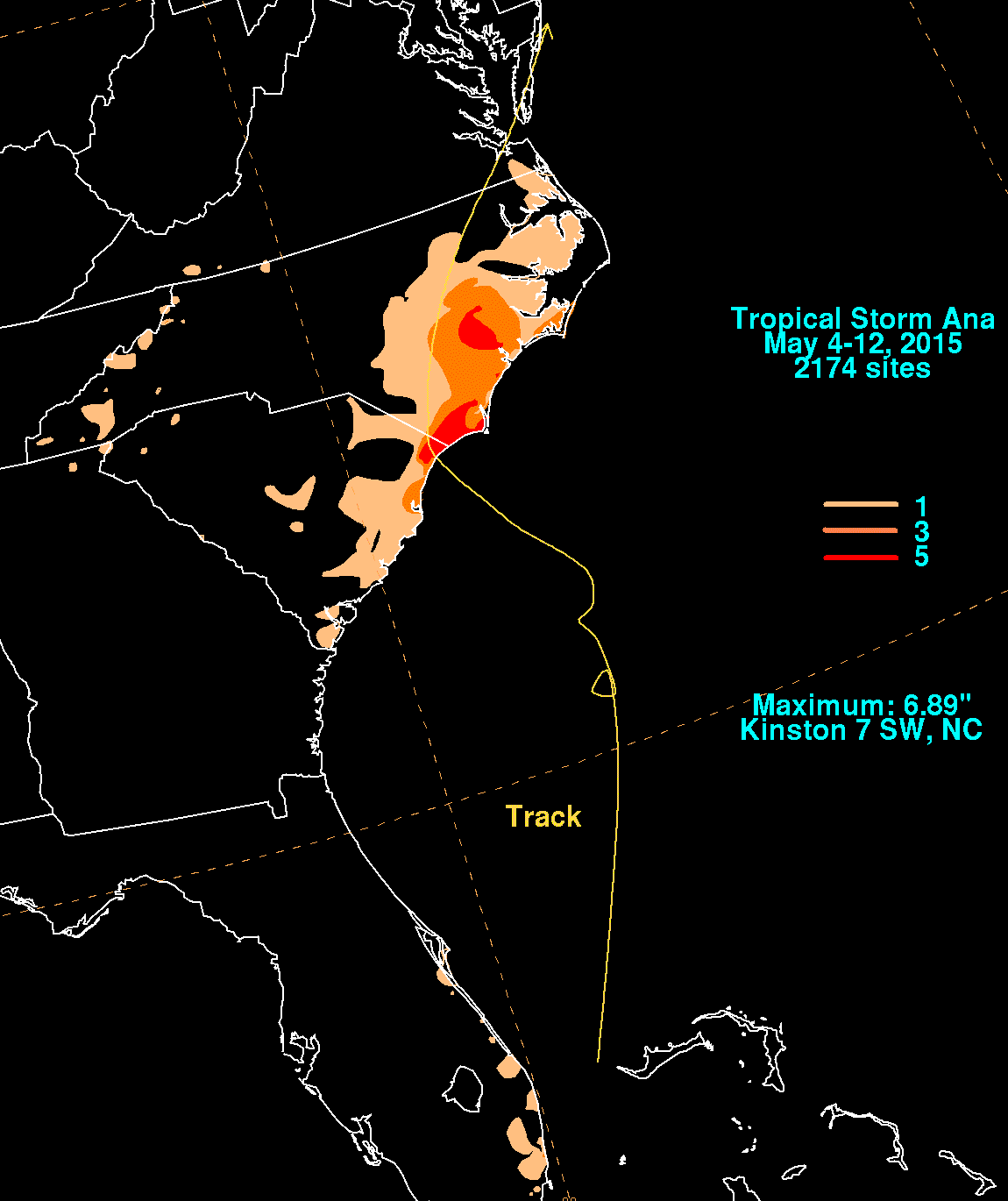
Map of rainfall totals associated with Ana across the Eastern United States

Immediately upon the storm's formation on May 8, a tropical storm watch was issued for coastal locations between Edisto Beach, South Carolina, and Cape Lookout, North Carolina. Early on May 8, the watch was upgraded to a tropical storm warning between the mouth of the South Santee River in South Carolina, and Surf City, North Carolina. The remainder of the watch north of Surf City was updated to a warning shortly thereafter. All tropical cyclone advisories were discontinued shortly after Ana made landfall.

Ana produced a small storm surge along the coasts of northeastern Florida, Georgia, and the Carolinas, peaking at near 2.5 ft (0.76 m) south of Myrtle Beach, South Carolina. The surge and above-normal tides produced minor coastal flooding, as well as 2 to 4 ft (0.61 to 1.22 m) of beach erosion. The storm left road washouts in North Myrtle Beach, and worsened a long-term erosion problem along Cherry Grove Beach. Shifting volumes of sand in Surf City exposed the structure of the wrecked schooner William H. Sumner, which grounded in 1919 and is occasionally visible along the beach. On May 7, heightened swells in the Charleston Harbor drove a sailboat aground, forcing the Coast Guard to rescue the stricken vessel's two occupants. Rip currents from the storm pulled a swimmer underwater for over ten minutes off Oak Island; the man died of his injuries the next day.

Upon making landfall, Ana produced gusty winds and moderate to heavy rainfall in parts of the Carolinas. The storm's lopsided convection pattern yielded much higher rain totals to the north of its track than to the south, as a general 3 to 6 in (76 to 152 mm) fell over eastern North Carolina and extreme northeastern South Carolina. Precipitation peaked at 6.89 in (175 mm) near Kinston, while North Myrtle Beach recorded 5.88 in (149 mm) of rain. A lake in North Myrtle Beach rose above its banks to inundate homes and local streets. More extensive freshwater flooding occurred in Lenoir County, North Carolina, where the swollen Southwest Creek flooded its environs up to 5 ft (1.5 m) deep. The local fire department rescued several stranded individuals by boat when rising floodwaters isolated about 10 residences. Despite the sporadic cases of flooding, the rainfall was considered beneficial, having arrived during a typically dry part of the year.

Ana also caused crop damage and forced commercial growers to delay their planting dates. Winds gusted as high as 60 mph (97 km/h) in coastal areas of the Carolinas and at offshore anemometers. Near Richlands, North Carolina, gusty winds toppled a tree onto a roadway, causing a traffic accident that left one man dead. Another tree in the same area fell through the roof of a mobile home, and several flimsy structures sustained wind damage. Damage from this incident totaled to $15,000. Damage to electrical wires triggered scattered power outages in North Carolina. A waterspout developed on the Croatan Sound in one of the storm's outer bands, becoming a tornado as it moved over Roanoke Island. The tornado, rated EF0 on the Enhanced Fujita scale, brought down a few small trees and damaged the roof of a house. Damage from this incident totaled $5,000.

== See also ==
- Other storms of the same name
- List of North Carolina hurricanes
- List of off-season Atlantic hurricanes
- Subtropical Storm Andrea (2007)
- Tropical Storm Beryl (2012)
- Tropical Storm Bonnie (2016)
- Tropical Storm Bertha (2020)
- Tropical Storm Chantal (2025)
