= 1867 Atlantic hurricane season =

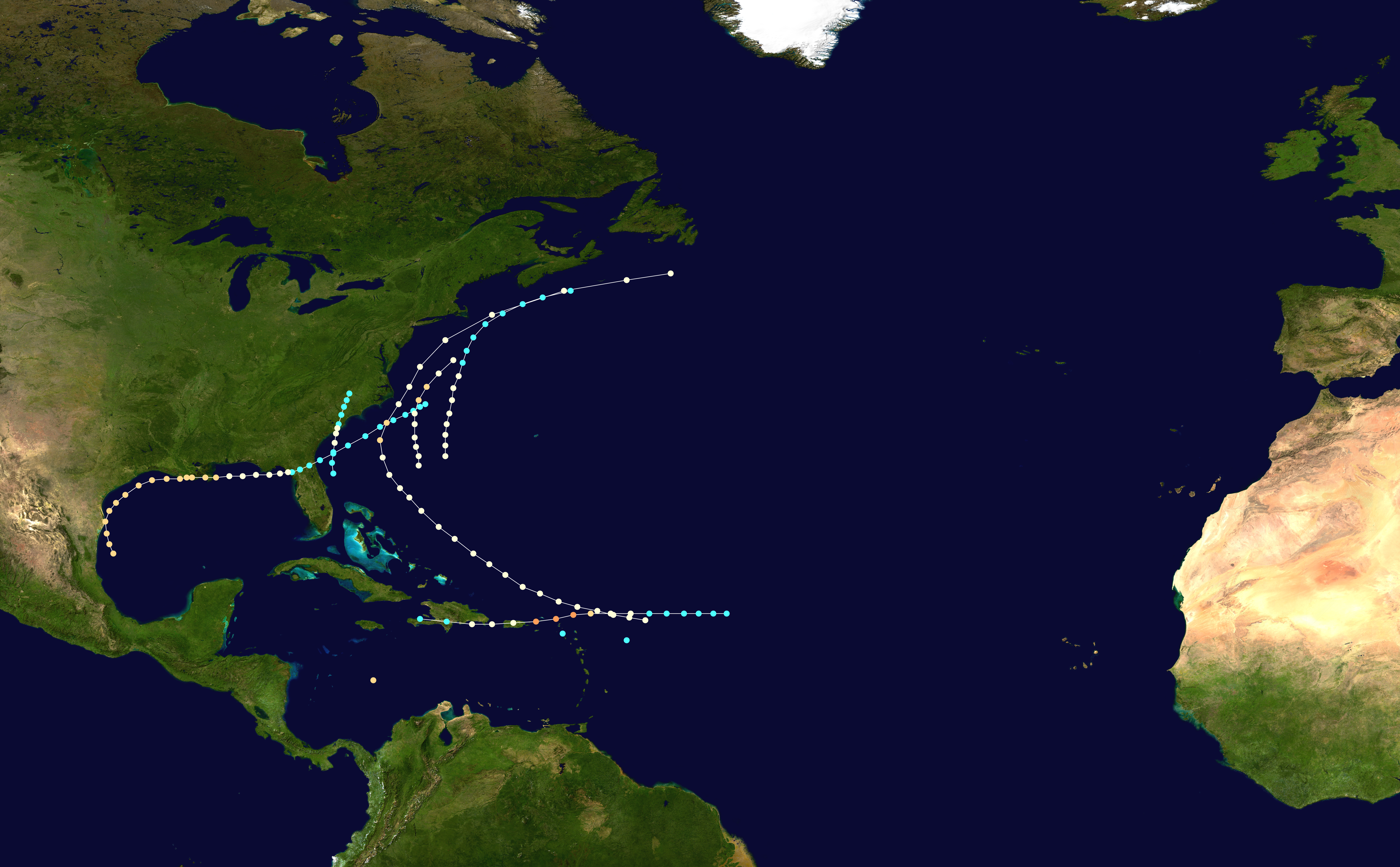
- Season summary map

Seasonal boundaries
- First system formed: June 21, 1867
- Last system dissipated: October 31, 1867

Strongest storm
- Name: Nine
  - Maximum winds: 125 mph (205 km/h) (1-minute sustained)
  - Lowest pressure: 952 mbar (hPa; 28.11 inHg)

Seasonal statistics
- Total storms: 9
- Hurricanes: 7
- Major hurricanes (Cat. 3+): 1
- Total fatalities: 1,090
- Total damage: At least $1 million (1867 USD)

The 1867 Atlantic hurricane season featured the San Narciso hurricane, one of the deadliest tropical cyclones to impact the Virgin Islands and Puerto Rico. A total of nine known tropical systems developed during the season, with the earliest existing by June 21 and the last dissipating on October 31. Of the nine cyclones, seven intensified into hurricanes, one of which became a major hurricane. (Note: A major hurricane is a storm that ranks as Category 3 or higher on the Saffir–Simpson hurricane wind scale.) However, in the absence of modern satellite and other remote-sensing technologies, only storms that affected populated land areas or encountered ships at sea were recorded, so the actual total could be higher. An undercount bias of zero to six tropical cyclones per year between 1851 and 1885.

The most intense cyclone of the season, the ninth storm, also known as the San Narciso hurricane, peaked as a Category 3 hurricane on the modern-day Saffir–Simpson scale with maximum sustained winds of 125 mph (205 km/h) in late October. Striking the Leeward Islands and Puerto Rico at Category 3 intensity and later the Dominican Republic as a Category 1 hurricane, the cyclone killed approximately 1,050 people, more than half on or just offshore Saint Thomas. Puerto Rico alone reported at least $1 million (1867 USD) in damage. (Note: All damage figures are in 1867 USD, unless otherwise noted) Several other storms impacted land, with the first cyclone causing wind damage in coastal Georgia and South Carolina and crop losses over eastern North Carolina. Some wind and erosion damage occurred in coastal areas of Massachusetts as a result of the second storm, which also drowned 13 people due to maritime incidents. Additionally, the season's seventh cyclone severely impacted areas of Tamaulipas, Texas, and Louisiana near the Gulf of Mexico, with at least 27 fatalities, all but one in Tamaulipas.

Of the known 1867 cyclones, the third, fourth, fifth, and eight systems were first documented in 1995 by meteorologists José Fernández-Partagás and Henry F. Diaz. The first storm was identified in 2003 by Cary Mock and subsequently added to the official hurricane database (HURDAT) by the Atlantic hurricane reanalysis project. Neither Fernández-Partagás and Diaz nor the Atlantic hurricane reanalysis project could reconstruct tracks for the third, fifth, and eight cyclones, instead using only a single location point. However, a more recent study, published in 2014 and authored by climate scientist Michael Chenoweth, extended the tracks of several storms and proposed the addition of four systems not currently included in HURDAT, though these changes have yet to be approved.

== Season summary ==
The Atlantic hurricane database (HURDAT) recognizes nine tropical cyclones for the 1867 season. Of the nine systems, seven intensified into a hurricane, while one of those strengthened into a major hurricane. José Fernández-Partagás and Henry F. Diaz added third, fourth, fifth, and eight systems during their 1995 reanalysis. In the early 21st century, the Atlantic hurricane reanalysis project added one storm, the first cyclone, in 2003 based on research by Cary Mock, and only made significant changes to the seventh system in comparison to Fernández-Partagás and Diaz, extending the end of the track from October 5 to October 9. A reanalysis by climate researcher Michael Chenoweth, published in 2014, adds four storms for a total of thirteen cyclones. Chenoweth's study utilizes a more extensive collection of newspapers and ship logs, as well as late 19th century weather maps for the first time, in comparison to previous reanalysis projects. However, Chenoweth's proposals have yet to be incorporated into HURDAT.

Reports from two ships on June 21 indicated the existence of the season's first cyclone just offshore Florida. Intensifying into a hurricane, the system struck South Carolina on the following day, inflicting wind damage in Georgia and South Carolina and crop damage in eastern North Carolina. No further known activity occurred for more than a month, until a bark encountered the second cyclone to the north-northeast of the Leeward Islands on July 28. This storm caused wind and storm surge damage in parts of Massachusetts in early August, as well as 13 deaths after capsizing ships. Two cyclones developed in August, both of which reached hurricane intensity. September also featured two systems, a tropical storm and a hurricane. In October, one tropical storm and two hurricanes formed. The first of the two hurricanes, the season's seventh overall, severely impacted areas of Tamaulipas, Texas, and Louisiana near the Gulf of Mexico, killing at least 27 people. The most intense cyclone of the season, the ninth storm, also known as the San Narciso hurricane, peaked as a Category 3 hurricane with maximum sustained winds of 125 mph (205 km/h) and a minimum atmospheric pressure of 952 mbar (28.1 inHg) in late October. Tracking through the Virgin Islands and Puerto Rico at major hurricane intensity and then striking the Dominican Republic as a Category 1 hurricane, the storm caused approximately 1,050 deaths throughout its path and at least $1 million in damage in Puerto Rico alone. On October 31, the cyclone likely dissipated over Haiti, ending seasonal activity.

The season's activity was reflected with an accumulated cyclone energy (ACE) rating of 60. ACE is a metric used to express the energy used by a tropical cyclone during its lifetime. Therefore, a storm with a longer duration will have higher values of ACE. It is only calculated at six-hour increments in which specific tropical and subtropical systems are either at or above sustained wind speeds of 39 mph (63 km/h), which is the threshold for tropical storm intensity.

== Systems ==
=== Hurricane One ===
- Category 1 hurricane (SSHWS)
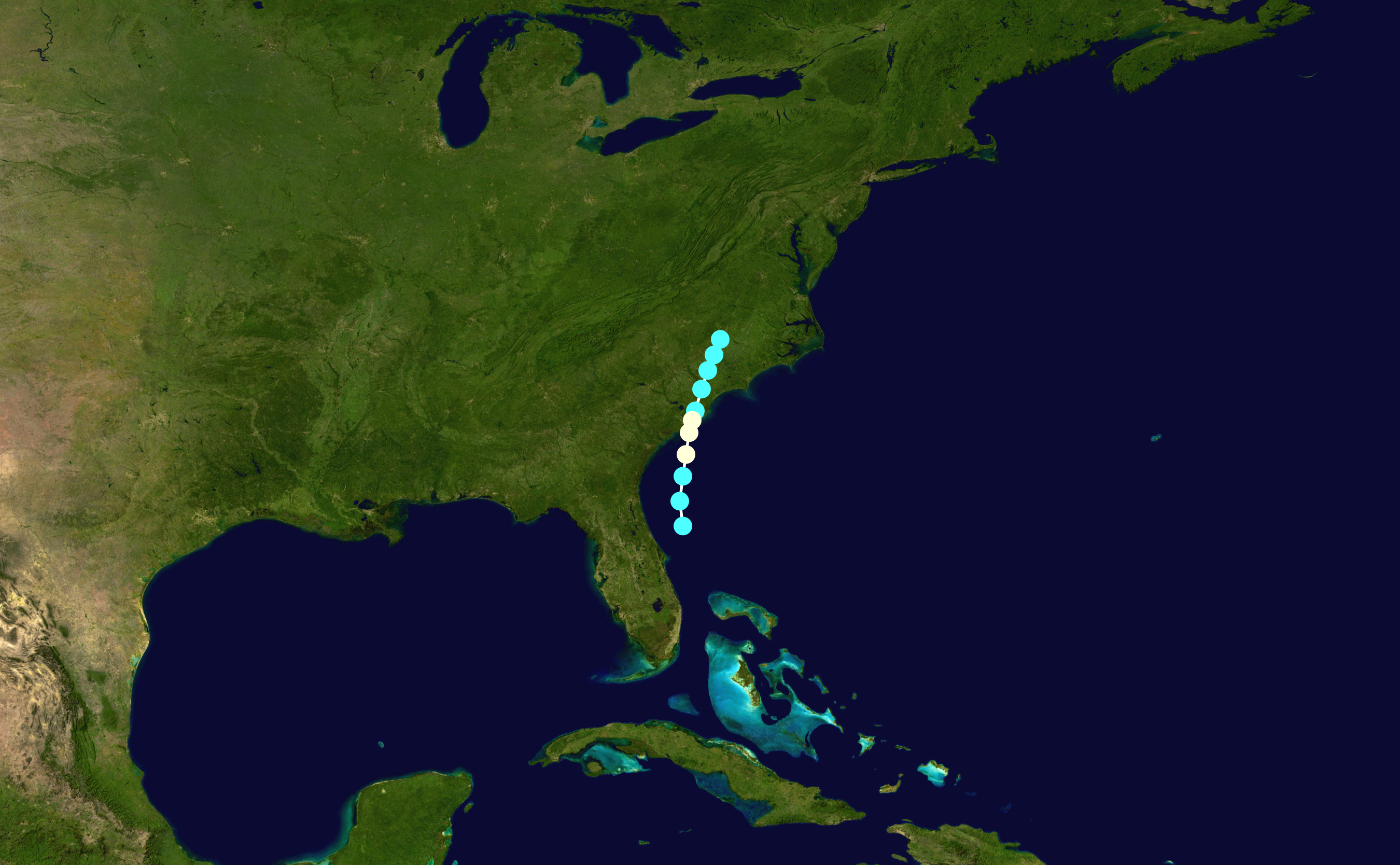
- Duration: June 21 – June 23
- Peak intensity: 80 mph (130 km/h) (1-min); 985 mbar (hPa)

The official hurricane database (HURDAT) begins the track for approximately 65 mi (105 km) east-northeast of Daytona Beach, Florida, at 12:00 UTC on June 21, the day that the ships Alex Miliken and Agnes recorded sustained winds of 50 mph (80 km/h). The tropical storm moved almost due north while strengthening steadily. Around 06:00 UTC on June 22, the system had intensified into a Category 1 hurricane, while moving slowly east-northeastward. The hurricane then made landfall about eight hours later near Charleston, South Carolina, with peak winds of 80 mph (130 km/h) and a barometric pressure of 985 mbar (29.1 inHg). Weakening steadily, the system's last known location was near Raleigh, North Carolina, on June 23.

Climate scientist Michael Chenoweth proposed that this cyclone actually began as a subtropical storm on June 20. Transitioning into a tropical cyclone and strengthening into a hurricane, the storm instead made landfall near present-day Edisto Beach, South Carolina, and dissipated over the state. In Savannah, Georgia reported many downed trees, some of which struck a home, a building, and fences. Strong winds in Charleston, South Carolina, damaged many wharves, unroofed homes, toppled chimneys. Many large trees branches and trees felled, leaving some streets and sidewalks impassable. Heavy rainfall in eastern North Carolina caused extensive crop losses, especially to corn, cotton, and rice.

=== Hurricane Two ===
- Category 2 hurricane (SSHWS)
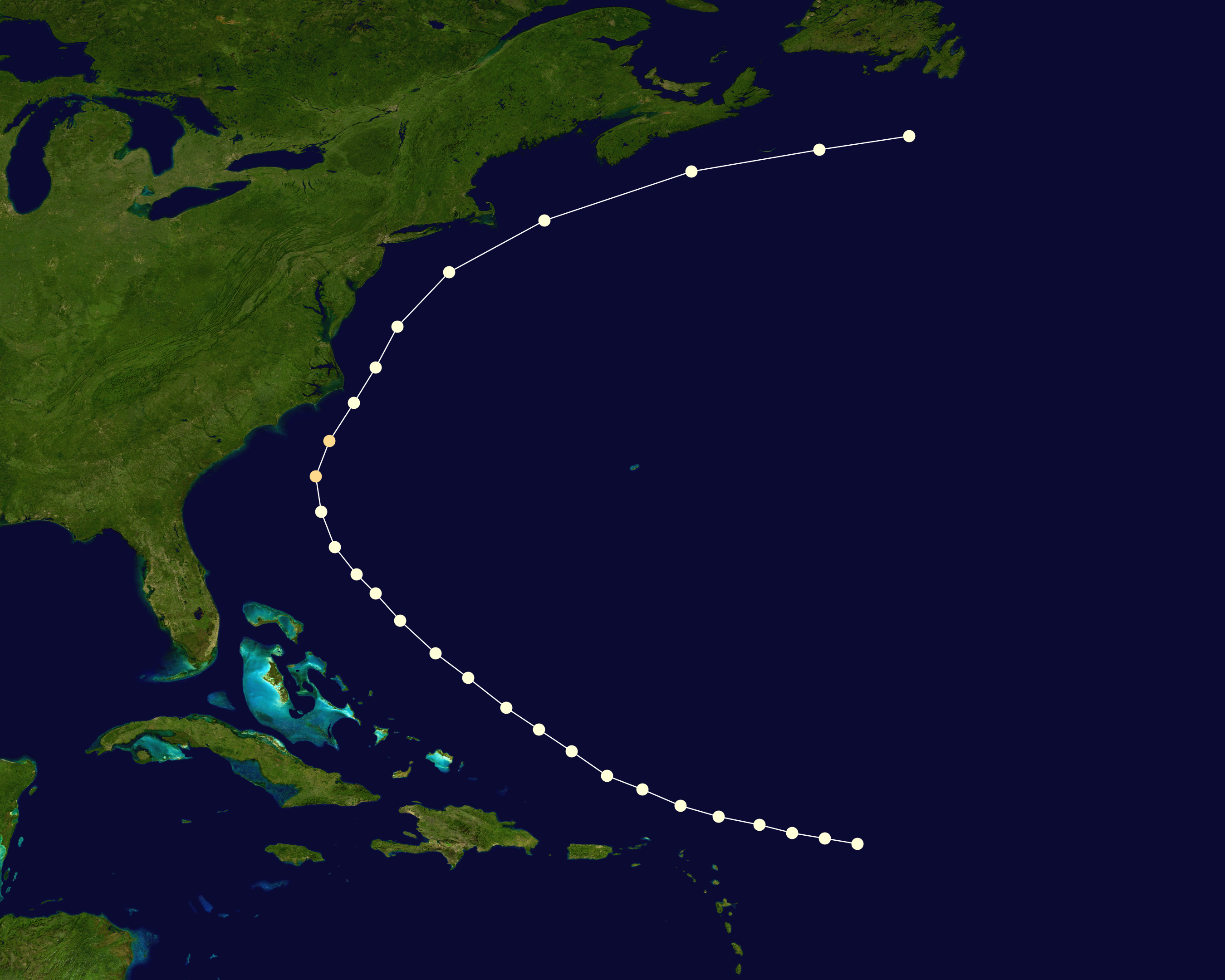
- Duration: July 28 – August 3
- Peak intensity: 105 mph (165 km/h) (1-min); 969 mbar (hPa)

The bark St. Ursula observed a hurricane about 375 mi (600 km) east-northeast of Dominica on July 28. Tracking generally northwestward, the storm changed little in intensity until located to the north of Grand Turk. From there, it proceeded northwestward, and intensified to near Category 2 hurricane status. As it moved to the southwest of Wilmington, North Carolina on August 1, the storm attained its peak intensity of 105 mph (165 km/h) and a minimum barometric pressure of 969 mbar (28.6 inHg), based on observations from a ship located about 140 mi (230 km) east of Norfolk, Virginia. Shortly thereafter, the cyclone commenced re-curving to the northeast and began a weakening trend, falling to Category 1 strength by early on August 2. Further weakening occurred while the hurricane was located to east of Sable Island. The storm was last reported to the south of Cape Race on the island of Newfoundland on August 3.

Chenoweth argued that the system crossed the northern Lesser Antilles, far eastern Massachusetts, and Atlantic Canada. He also added a tropical storm stage prior to 06:00 UTC on July 30, another stint as a tropical storm starting at 12:00 UTC on August 3, and an extratropical transition at 06:00 UTC on August 4. On Nantucket, the island reported gale-force winds from the southeast, torrential rainfall, and waves washing over 8 to 10 ft (2.4 to 3.0 m) hills. The winds damaged crops, especially corn and garden vegetables, while toppling large trees, chimneys, and fences. Waves displaced "millions of loads of sand" into Hummock Pond, according to Nantucket's Mirror newspaper, while also cutting a 100 ft (30 m) channel from the pond into the ocean. Two deaths occurred offshore the East Coast of the United States after a brig sank. In Atlantic Canada, 11 people from Marblehead, Massachusetts, died after being "lost in a gale" near Sable Island, according to the town records.

=== Hurricane Three ===
- Category 2 hurricane (SSHWS)
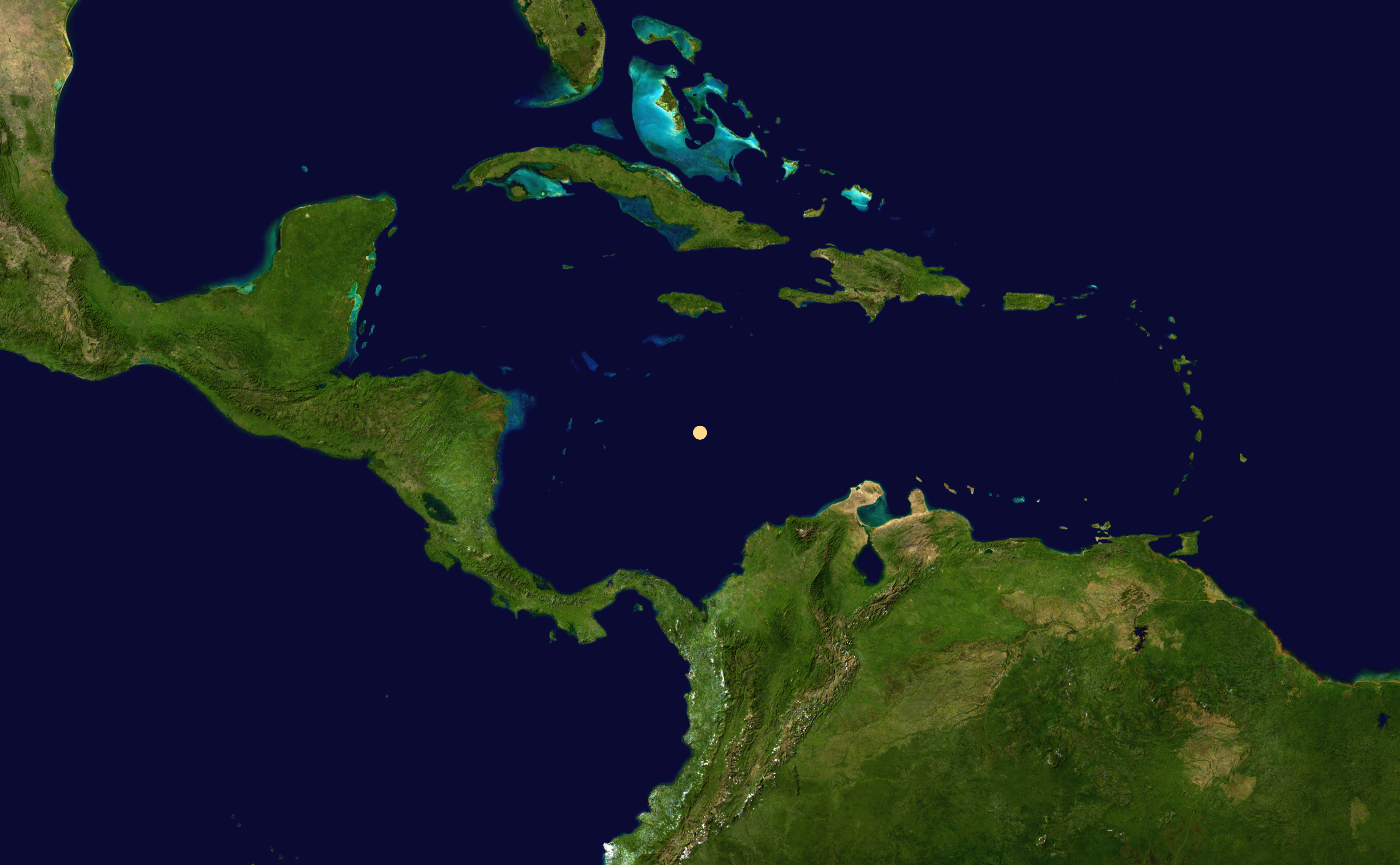
- Duration: August 2 – August 2
- Peak intensity: 105 mph (165 km/h) (1-min);

Early on August 2, the ship Suwanee encountered a hurricane over the central Caribbean Sea. The storm reached an estimated peak intensity of 105 mph (165 km/h), making it a Category 2 hurricane. However, with no other reports available, this storm is represented by only a single data point. Chenoweth proposed that this cyclone instead developed on August 10 near the Florida Keys. After striking near Mexico Beach, Florida, as a tropical storm late on August 13, the system moved generally northeastward across the United States until becoming extratropical over eastern Pennsylvania on August 16.

=== Hurricane Four ===
- Category 1 hurricane (SSHWS)
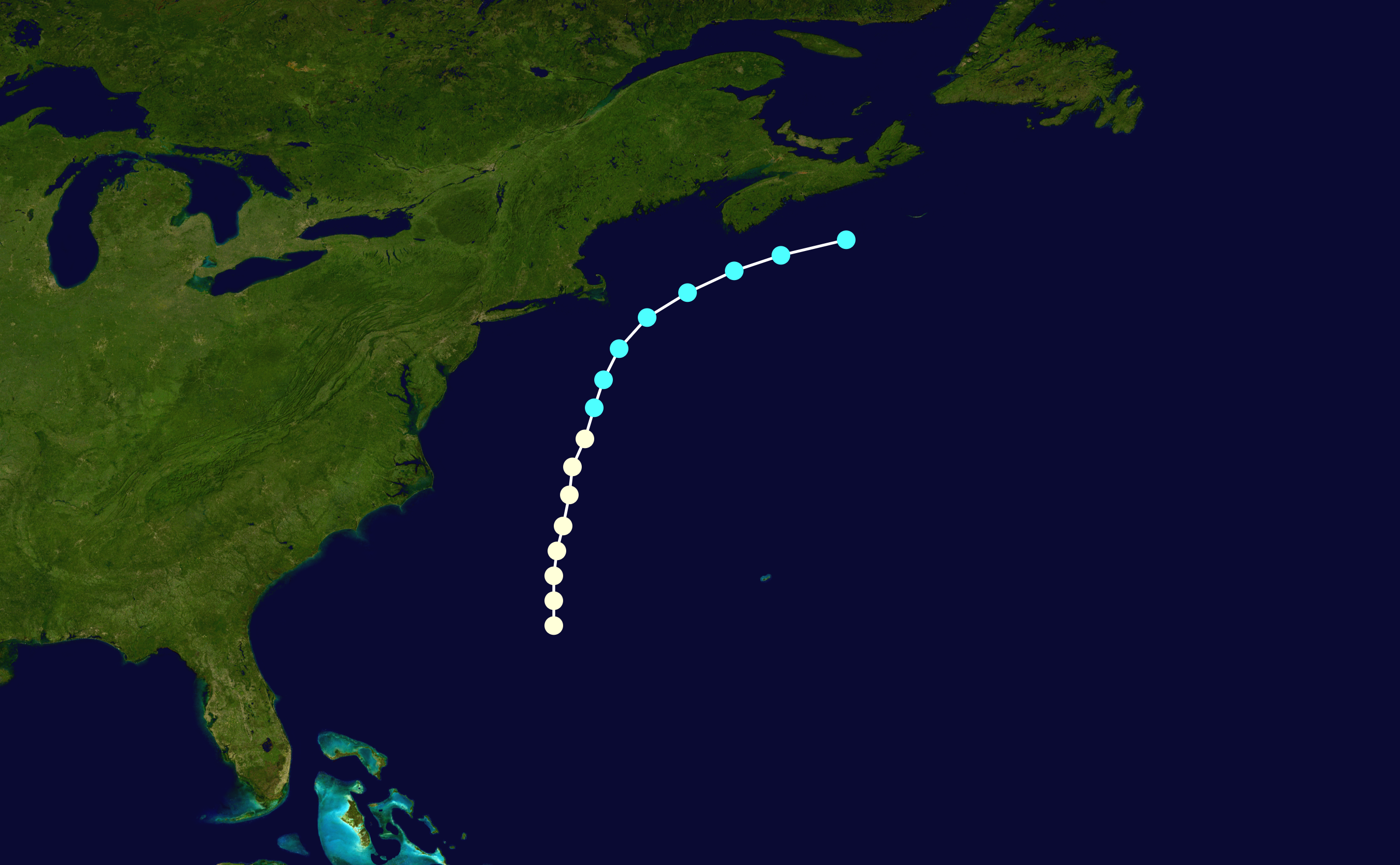
- Duration: August 31 – September 3
- Peak intensity: 80 mph (130 km/h) (1-min);

Late on August 31, a Category 1 hurricane with maximum sustained winds of 80 mph (130 km/h) was reported by the ship Helene R. Cooper over the Central Atlantic. Moving generally north to north-northeast, the storm gained no intensity over the next day or so as it passed between the United States East Coast and Bermuda. Late on September 2, the storm retained tropical storm status as it paralleled the East Coast of the United States. Retracing to the east at an increasing forward speed, the storm system held its intensity of 70 mph (110 km/h) for the rest of its existence. Chenoweth traced this cyclone back to September 1 as a tropical storm just offshore North Carolina. However, the storm never attained hurricane status and was last noted near Sable Island on September 3.

=== Tropical Storm Five ===
- Tropical storm (SSHWS)
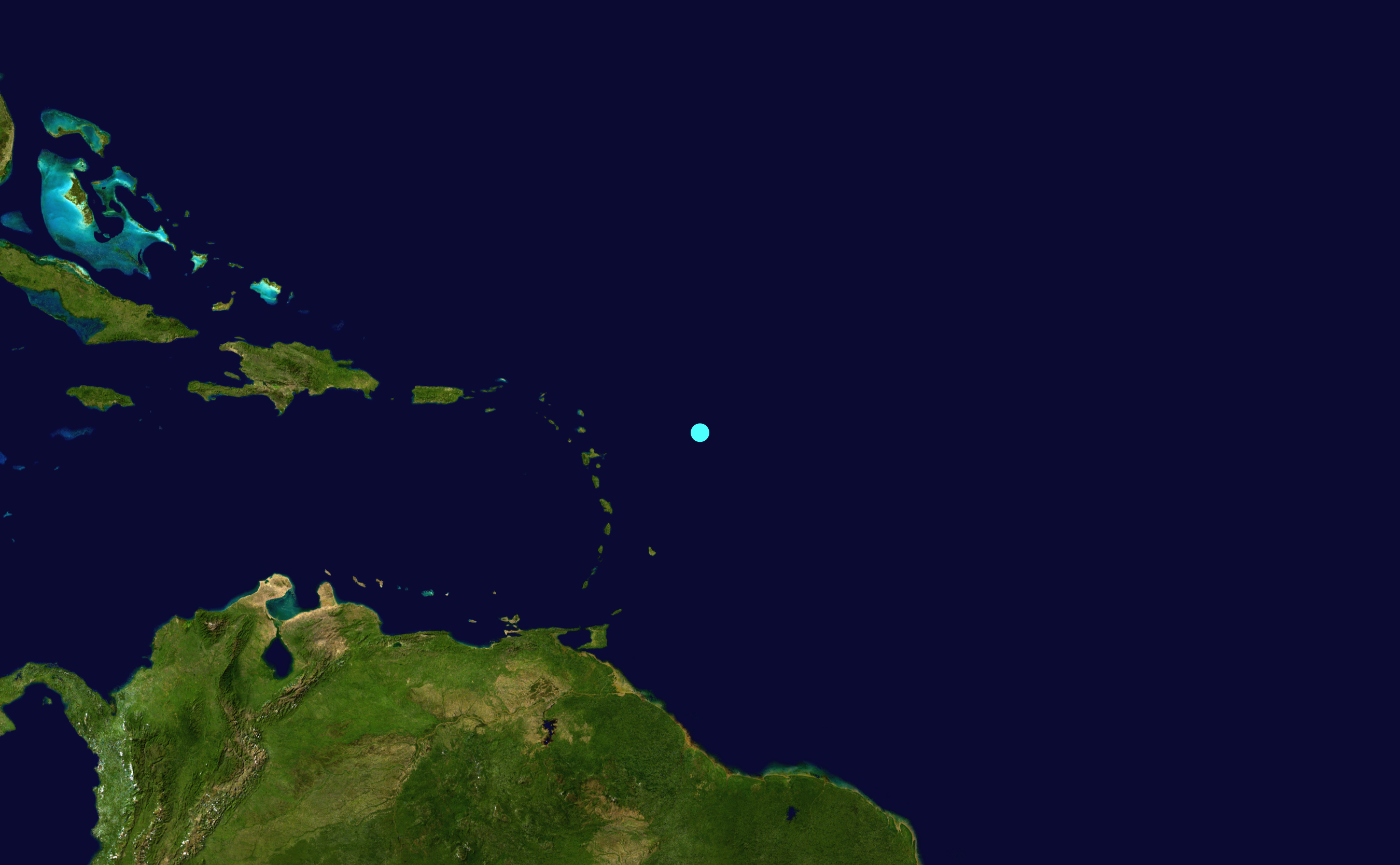
- Duration: September 8 – September 8
- Peak intensity: 60 mph (95 km/h) (1-min);

Early on September 8, the schooner Matilda encountered a tropical cyclone roughly 200 mi (320 km) to the east of the Leeward Islands. The storm's recorded wind speeds reached no more than 60 mph (95 km/h), and there were no further reports of it on subsequent days. The reanalysis study by Chenoweth argued that a tropical depression formed south of the Cabo Verde Islands on September 3. Traveling west-northwestward, the cyclone intensified into a tropical storm but remained relatively weak and degenerated into a tropical wave on September 8. However, the wave regenerated into a tropical cyclone north of the Lesser Antilles on September 11, but dissipated on the following day near Bermuda.

=== Hurricane Six ===
- Category 2 hurricane (SSHWS)
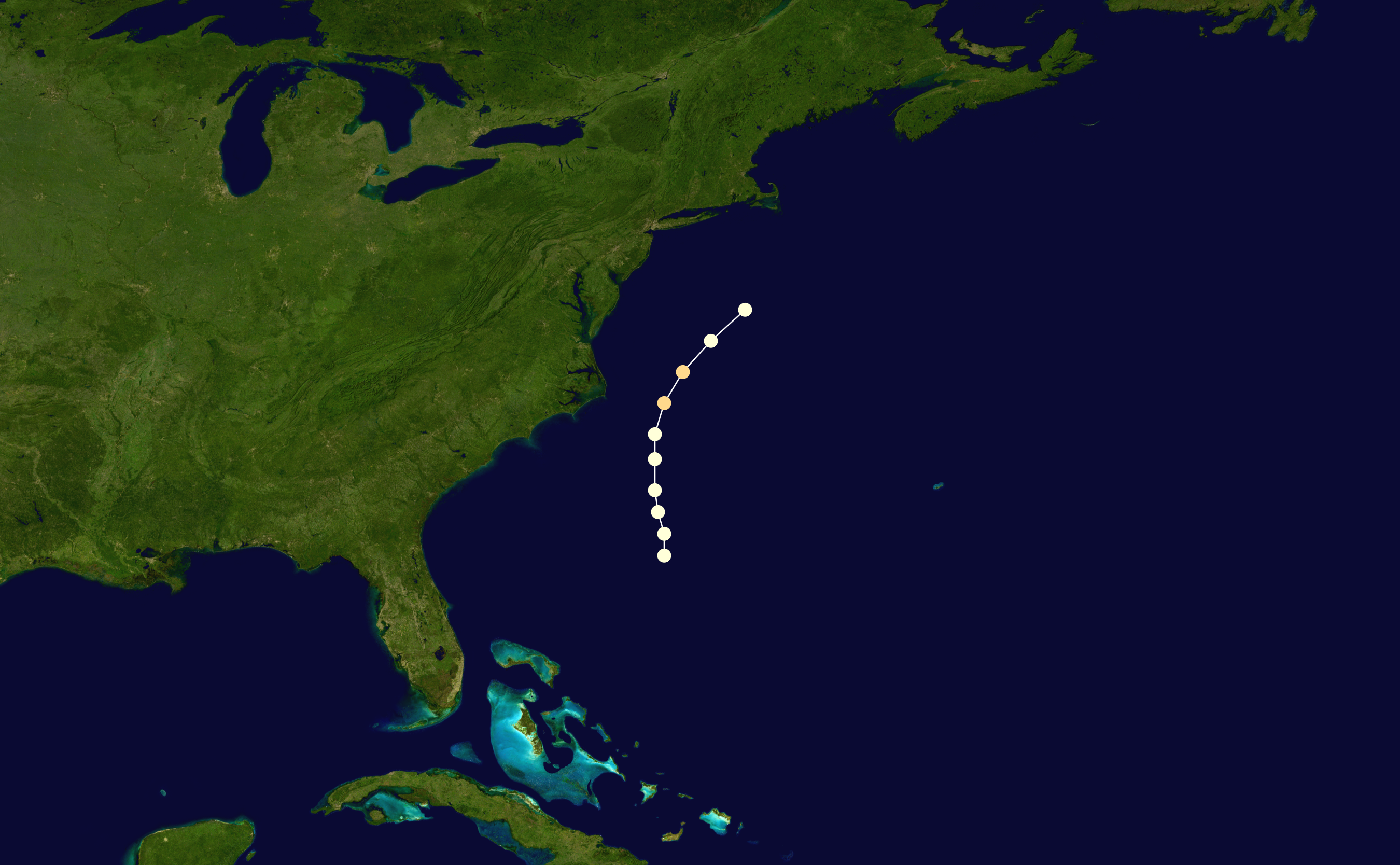
- Duration: September 29 – October 1
- Peak intensity: 105 mph (165 km/h) (1-min);

Late on September 29, the ships Josephine B. Small, Gen. Marshall, and New Light encountered a Category 1 hurricane several hundred miles north of the Bahamas. Tracking to the north, the storm system gained very little strength while passing several hundred miles southeast of Savannah, Georgia. It reportedly attained Category 2 hurricane status while located approximately 100 mi (160 km) to the east of Cape Hatteras, North Carolina, with winds peaking at 105 mph (165 km/h). Spinning to the north-northeast, the hurricane eventually entered a weakening phase, and its last reported location was approximately 285 mi (460 km) northeast of Virginia Beach, Virginia. This hurricane never made landfall. Chenoweth proposed that this system began as a subtropical storm on September 27. The system transitioned into a tropical cyclone and intensified into a hurricane as it nearly executed a cyclonic loop, before accelerating to the northeast on September 30. On October 1, the cyclone was last noted south of Newfoundland.

=== Hurricane Seven ===
- Category 2 hurricane (SSHWS)
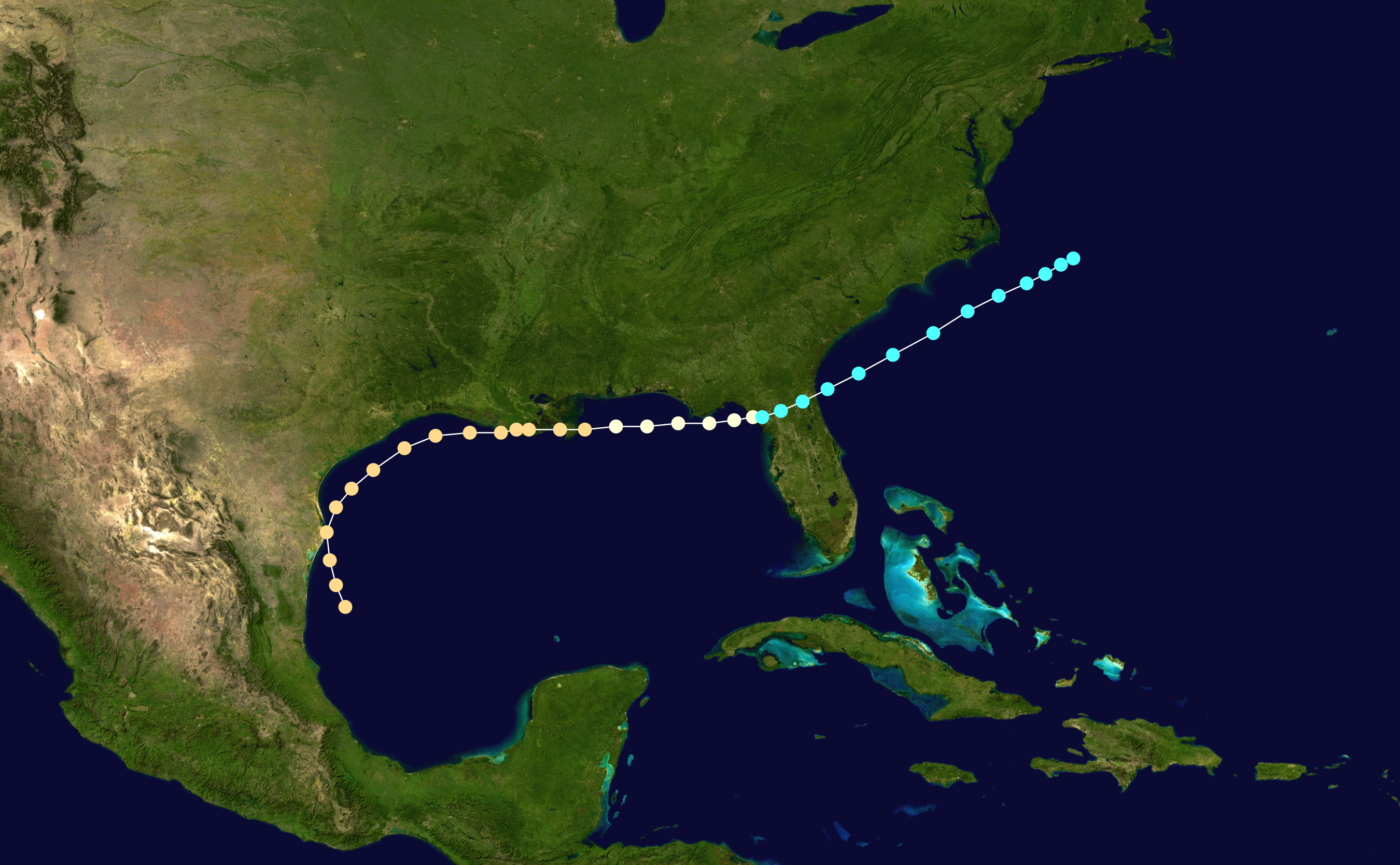
- Duration: October 2 – October 9
- Peak intensity: 105 mph (165 km/h) (1-min); 965 mbar (hPa)

The Galveston Hurricane of 1867

Late on October 2, a hurricane was detected over the Gulf of Mexico, offshore northeastern Mexico. Holding its intensity, the storm system paralleled the Texas coastline. David M. Ludlum noted that a storm tide value of 7 ft (2.1 m) there, and it is possible that Brownsville, was in the western eyewall of the hurricane at the storm's closest approach. Turning towards Louisiana, the storm made landfall near Port Eads with winds of 105 mph (165 km/h), a Category 2 hurricane, and a minimum barometric pressure of 965 mbar (28.5 inHg). Moving to the east and weakening, the cyclone then struck near Cedar Key, Florida, on October 6 as a tropical storm. After emerging into the Atlantic near Jacksonville on the following day, the cyclone turned northeastward and was last noted offshore North Carolina on October 9. Chenoweth argued that this system actually developed over the northwest Caribbean on September 25 and crossed the Yucatán Peninsula before entering the Gulf of Mexico. The storm also made landfall just south of the Mexico–United States border early on October 2 as a Category 3 hurricane before re-emerging into the Gulf of Mexico hours later.

As the storm approached northeastern Mexico, Matamoros and Bagdad experienced significant impacts. Because of the devastating effects, Tamaulipas authorities sought help from the governors of Nuevo León and Coahuila. The governor of Nuevo León authorized the state to send over 100 bushels of corn; Coahuila's sent 500 loads of flour. Relief was also sent from Veracruz in two vessels. Agriculturalists in Matamoros were allowed to send their goods to Monterrey for storage. The entire population of Bagdad fled, while Matamoros was left nearly in ruins. Local accounts stated that at least 26 people died, but the official death toll in the area remains unknown. Entire families disappeared from the area too. In Texas, most buildings in Brazos Santiago were leveled. Clarksville, 2 mi (3.2 km), was also devastated and shortly later abandoned. Storm surge flooded Galveston, already in the midst of a yellow fever epidemic, washing away the mainland rail bridge, a hotel, and hundreds of homes. The hurricane wrecked twelve schooners and a river steamboat in the bay and destroyed wharves. In Louisiana, high seas and heavy rains flooded New Orleans on October 3, while high winds blew away bath houses and a saw mill. Houses were also swept away at Milneberg and at Pilottown. The Ship Shoal Light was damaged while the Shell Keys lighthouse was destroyed and its keeper killed. High winds and heavy rainfall continued across southeast Louisiana until October 6, damaging crops.

=== Tropical Storm Eight ===
- Tropical storm (SSHWS)
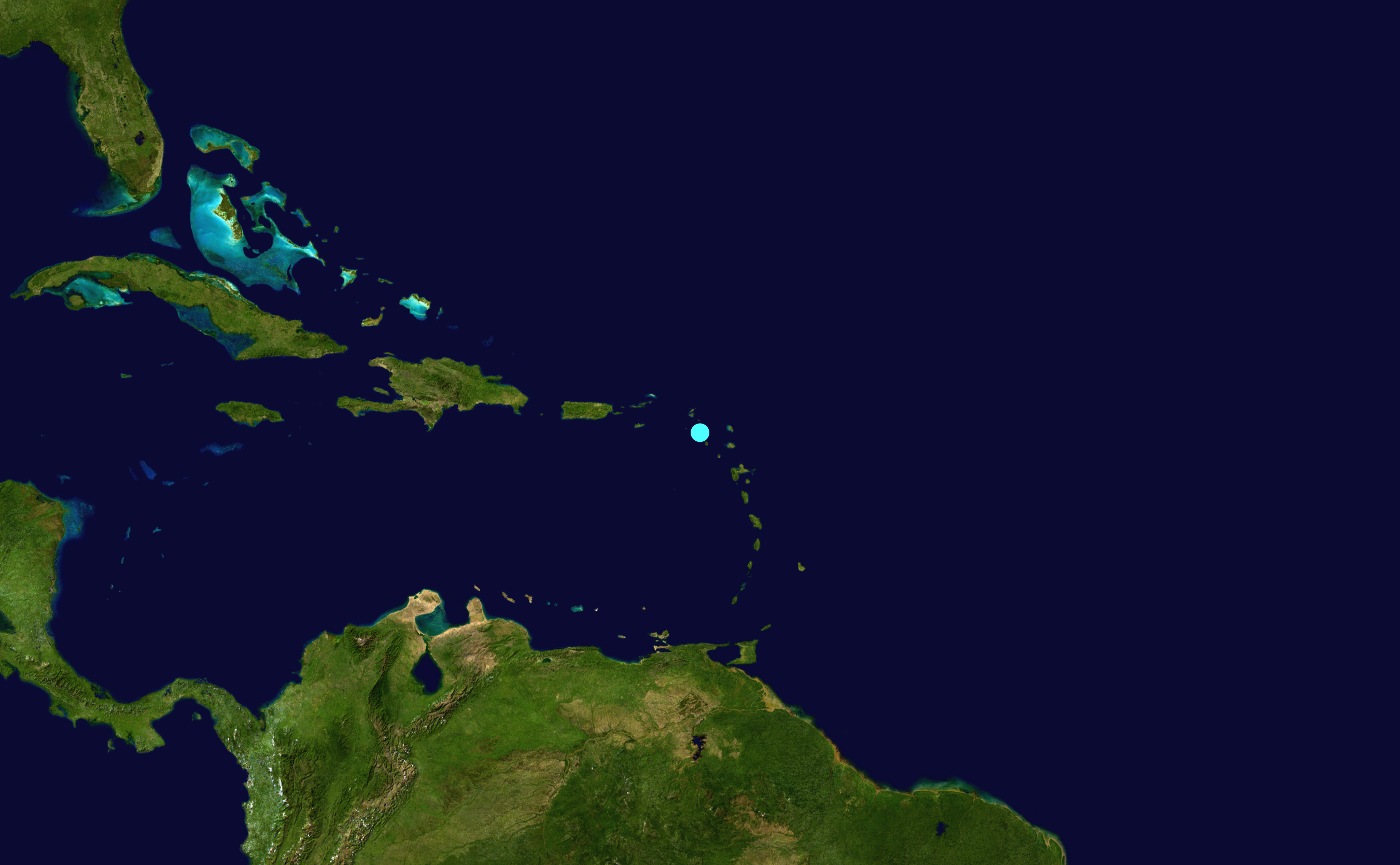
- Duration: October 9 – October 9
- Peak intensity: 45 mph (75 km/h) (1-min);

This tropical storm is known from having wrecked the schooner Three Sisters on the night of October 9 at Saint Martin in the eastern Caribbean. Neither Fernández-Partagás and Diaz nor the Atlantic hurricane reanalysis project could construct a track beyond the single point, with the cyclone possessing sustained winds of 45 mph (75 km/h). The storm may have been associated with other weather reports in the Lesser Antilles. For example, Barbados recorded 7 in (180 mm) of precipitation on October 7. Some ships were wrecked in the Lesser Antilles, especially on Martinique, which also reported damage to ships, plantations, and several buildings. Puerto Rico also reported flooding and shipwrecks on October 13. However, it is uncertain if impacts in any areas other than Saint Martin were related to the cyclone. Chenoweth traced this cyclone back October 8 as a tropical storm just east of the Windward Islands, passing over Martinique that day. The storm intensified into a hurricane and clipped Puerto Rico before striking the Dominican Republic. Another landfall occurred on Cuba as a tropical storm, before the system dissipated over the island on October 12.

=== Hurricane Nine ===
- Category 3 hurricane (SSHWS)
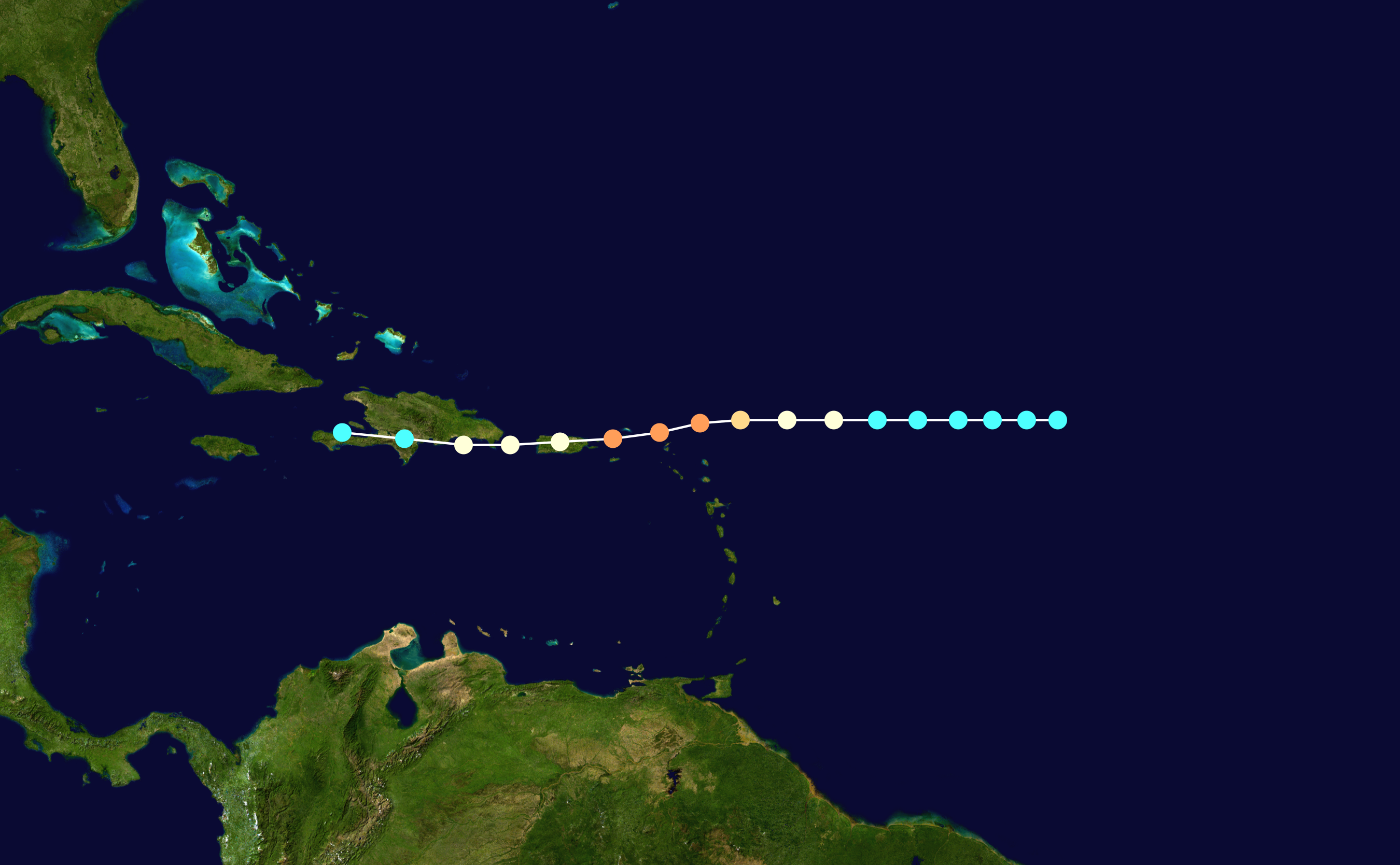
- Duration: October 27 – October 31
- Peak intensity: 125 mph (205 km/h) (1-min); 952 mbar (hPa)

Hurricane San Narciso of 1867

The mail steamer Principe Alfonso first observed this cyclone about 750 mi (1,205 km) east-northeast of Barbuda around 00:00 UTC on October 27. Moving westward, the storm intensified, becoming a hurricane on the following day. The system further strengthened into a major hurricane, reaching Category 3 early on October 29. Around that time, the hurricane made landfall on Sombrero Island, an outlying island of Anguilla. The storm peaked with winds of 125 mph (205 km/h) and a pressure of 952 mbar (28.1 inHg) shortly before striking Saint Thomas in the Danish West Indies. Late on October 29, the hurricane struck northeastern Puerto Rico near Fajardo with winds of 115 mph (185 km/h). The cyclone quickly weakened to a Category 1 over the island before emerging into the Mona Passage. On October 30, the system struck just southwest of Santo Domingo, Dominican Republic, as a Category 1 hurricane. Mountainous terrain caused the storm to rapidly weaken and dissipate over Haiti on the following day.

Chenoweth extended the duration of this system until early on November 1, with the storm instead dissipating near Inagua in the Bahamas after turning northwestward over the Dominican Republic. The hurricane left extensive impact in the British Virgin Islands, with the storm destroying about 100 homes on Virgin Gorda and 60 out of 123 homes on Tortola. Most sugar plantations and many crops were damaged. At least 39 deaths occurred in the British Virgin Islands, including 37 on Tortola and 2 on Peter Island. At Saint Thomas, the hurricane destroyed about 80 ships, including the RMS Rhone. On land and offshore, the cyclone caused approximately 600 deaths. A death toll of 211, mostly due to drowning by floods or landslides, was reported on Puerto Rico, while the hurricane destroyed fourteen vessels and sixteen bridges on the island. Extensive losses occurred to Puerto Rico's agriculture, with reportedly all sugar and coffee crops ruined. Over 3,600 families were rendered destitute. Damage throughout the island totaled at least $1 million. In Dominican Republic, the cyclone nearly destroyed the city of Santo Domingo and caused about 200 additional deaths.

=== Other storms ===
Climate scientist Michael Chenoweth proposed four storms not currently listed in HURDAT. The first such system formed over the Bay of Campeche on July 19. Early the next day, the system made landfall near Vega de Alatorre, Veracruz, and quickly dissipated. Chenoweth's second unofficial storm first existed near the Cabo Verde Islands on August 29. For nearly a week, the storm drifted over the eastern Atlantic, before accelerating to the northeast and being last noted on September 13 west of the Azores. On September 15, Chenoweth's third unofficial storm developed over the north-central Gulf of Mexico. Striking far eastern Louisiana as a tropical storm on the following day, the system dissipated over southern Mississippi early on September 17. Chenoweth's fourth and final proposed system existed over the northeastern Atlantic as a tropical storm on September 24. The storm meandered for several days without strengthening significantly and was last noted near the western Azores on October 3.

== Seasonal effects ==
This is a table of all of the known storms that formed in the 1867 Atlantic hurricane season. It includes their known duration (within the basin), areas affected, damages, and death totals. Deaths in parentheses are additional and indirect (an example of an indirect death would be a traffic accident), but were still related to that storm. Damage and deaths include totals while the storm was extratropical, a wave, or a low, and all of the damage figures are in 1867 USD.

Saffir–Simpson scale
TD	TS	C1	C2	C3	C4	C5

1867 North Atlantic tropical cyclone season statistics
Storm name	Dates active	Storm category at peak intensity	Max 1-min wind mph (km/h)	Min. press. (mbar)	Areas affected	Damage (US$)	Deaths	Ref(s).
One	June 21–23	Category 1 hurricane	80 (130)	985	Southeastern United States (South Carolina)	Unknown	None	
Two	July 28–August 3	Category 2 hurricane	105 (165)	969	East Coast of the United States, Atlantic Canada	Unknown	13	
Three	August 2	Category 2 hurricane	105 (165)	Unknown	None	None	None	
Four	August 31–September 3	Category 1 hurricane	80 (130)	Unknown	Atlantic Canada	Unknown	None	
Five	September 8	Tropical storm	60 (95)	Unknown	None	None	None	
Six	September 29–October 1	Category 2 hurricane	105 (165)	Unknown	None	None	None	
Seven	October 2–9	Category 2 hurricane	105 (165)	965	Tamaulipas, Gulf Coast of the United States (Louisiana and Florida)	Unknown	27	
Eight	October 9	Tropical storm	45 (75)	Unknown	Saint Martin	Unknown	None	
Nine	October 27–31	Category 3 hurricane	125 (205)	952	Lesser Antilles (Anguilla, Saint Thomas, and Puerto Rico), Hispaniola (the Dominican Republic)	>$1 million	1,050	
Season aggregates
8 systems	June 1–October 13		115 (185)	952		>$1 million	1,090	

== See also ==
- Atlantic hurricane
- Atlantic hurricane reanalysis project
- Tropical cyclone observation
