= 1867 San Narciso hurricane =

Category 3 Atlantic hurricane in 1867

San Narciso hurricane
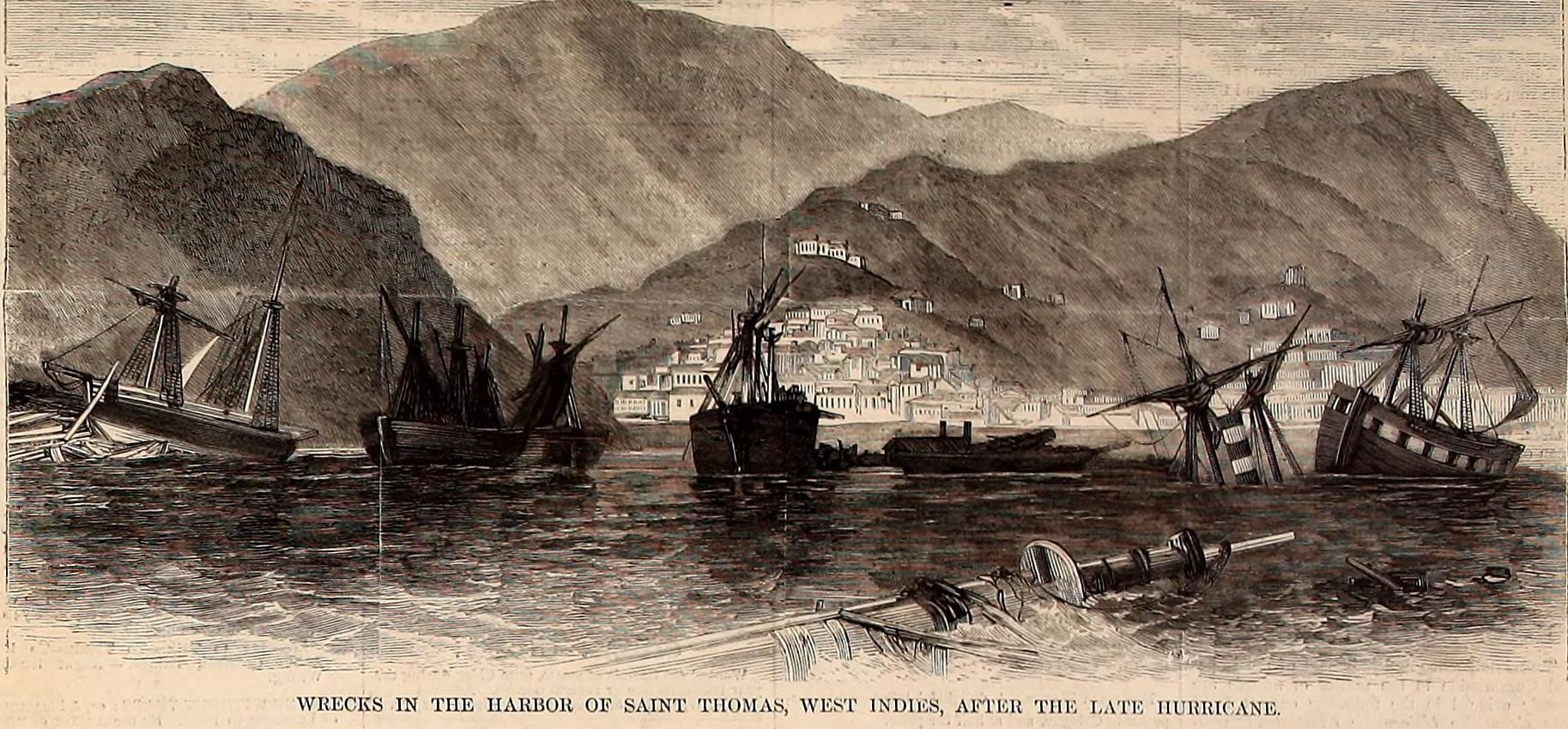
- Wrecks in the Harbor of Saint Thomas

Meteorological history
- Formed: October 27, 1867
- Dissipated: October 31, 1867

Category 3 major hurricane
- 1-minute sustained (SSHWS/NWS)
- Highest winds: 125 mph (205 km/h)
- Lowest pressure: 952 mbar (hPa); 28.11 inHg

Overall effects
- Fatalities: >811
- Damage: $1 million (1867 USD)
- Areas affected: Virgin Islands, Puerto Rico, Hispaniola
- IBTrACS
- Part of the 1867 Atlantic hurricane season

The San Narciso Hurricane was a record-breaking, extremely deadly Atlantic hurricane that caused devastation to the British Virgin Islands and Puerto Rico in 1867. Forming abnormally late for a Lesser Antilles hurricane, it went on to be the costliest and deadliest storm of the 1867 Atlantic hurricane season. It is the only hurricane in the official database to have struck Puerto Rico after September, (Note: The Atlantic database called "HURDAT" begins in 1851. Since 1500, 3 potential October landfalls occurred in 1526, 1766, and 1780 respectively; all earlier into their seasons.) doing so over a month later than the next latest hurricane.

The storm is infamous for striking just 20 days prior to the devastating 1867 Virgin Islands earthquake and tsunami in the same region.

In a 2014 analysis, climate historian Michael Chenoweth suggested that the storm reached Category 4 intensity. In total, it caused at least 811 deaths in Saint Thomas (Danish West Indies) and Captaincy General of Puerto Rico and around $1 million (1867 USD) in damage.

== Meteorological history ==
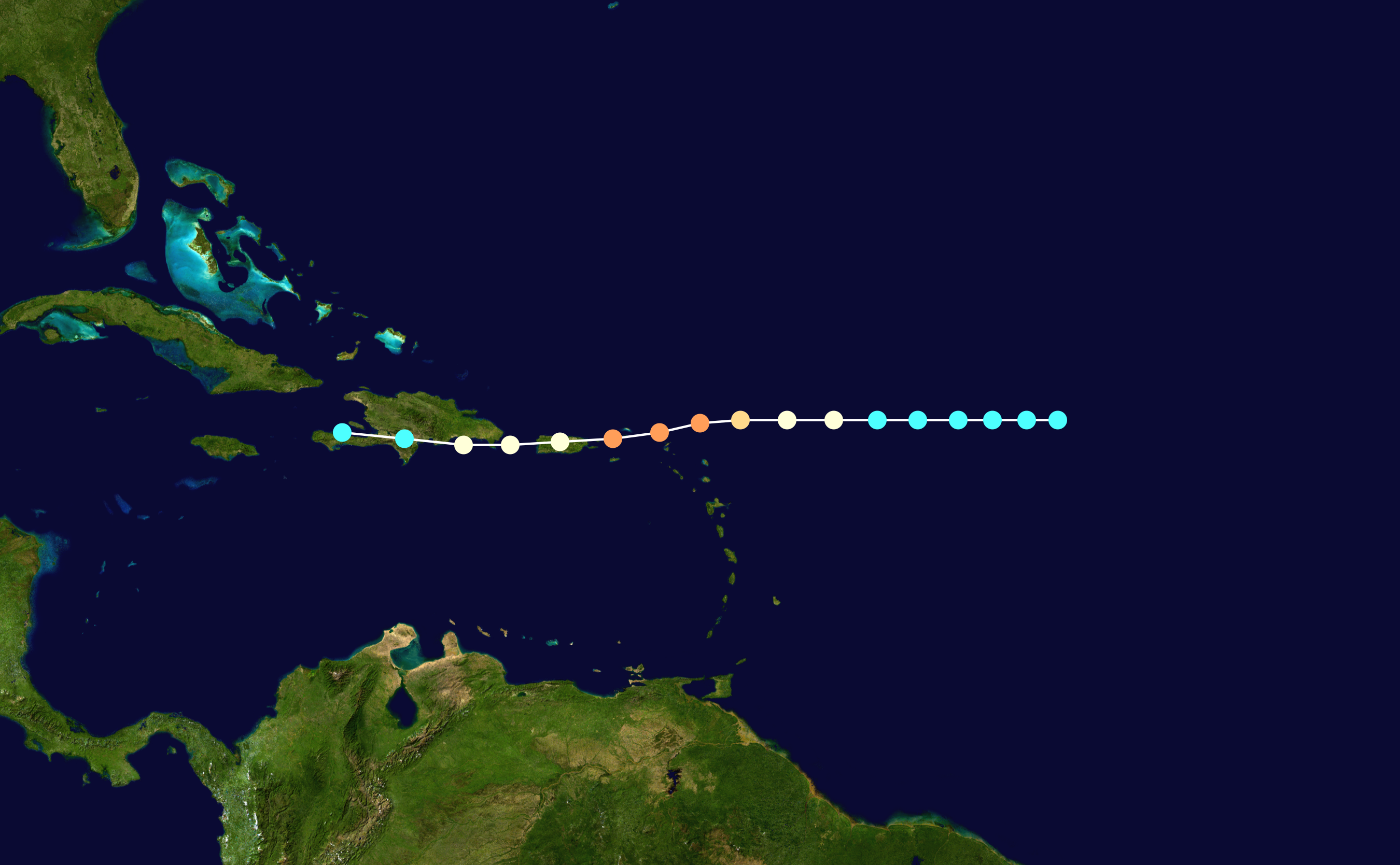
Map plotting the storm's track and intensity, according to the Saffir–Simpson scale Map key Saffir–Simpson scale Tropical depression (≤38 mph, ≤62 km/h) Tropical storm (39–73 mph, 63–118 km/h) Category 1 (74–95 mph, 119–153 km/h) Category 2 (96–110 mph, 154–177 km/h) Category 3 (111–129 mph, 178–208 km/h) Category 4 (130–156 mph, 209–251 km/h) Category 5 (≥157 mph, ≥252 km/h) Unknown Storm type Tropical cyclone Subtropical cyclone Extratropical cyclone, remnant low, tropical disturbance, or monsoon depression

On October 27, the storm developed northeast of the Lesser Antilles unusually late into the season, in which the mail steamer Principe Alfonso skillfully avoided the storm. This tropical storm continued westward before intensifying to a hurricane the next day. It then reached category 3 status on October 29, before striking Sombrero, Anguilla near or at peak intensity. After 8 am local, a barometric pressure of 28.65 inches of mercury (97.0 kPa) accompanied by a half-hour calm occurred. The wind then shifted to a violent easterly until 11 am and then diminished through 1 pm. The hurricane reached its peak intensity of 125 miles per hour (201 km/h) at 1200 UTC near the island.

From 1:30 pm to 2:00 pm local, the eye passed over Sankt Thomas, Danish West Indies.

The hurricane made landfall on Puerto Rico late during the day on October 29th; less than three days from November. Despite its small size, it ranks among the most intense hurricanes recorded on the island. It passed near the city of Fajardo between 5 pm and 6 pm local, and later passed near Caguas. People sensed tremors in the towns of Humacao, Luquillo, and Peñuelas. The storm affected every town on the island of Puerto Rico. It then struck the island of Hispaniola as a hurricane, and then dissipated over the high mountains on October 30th.

== Impact ==
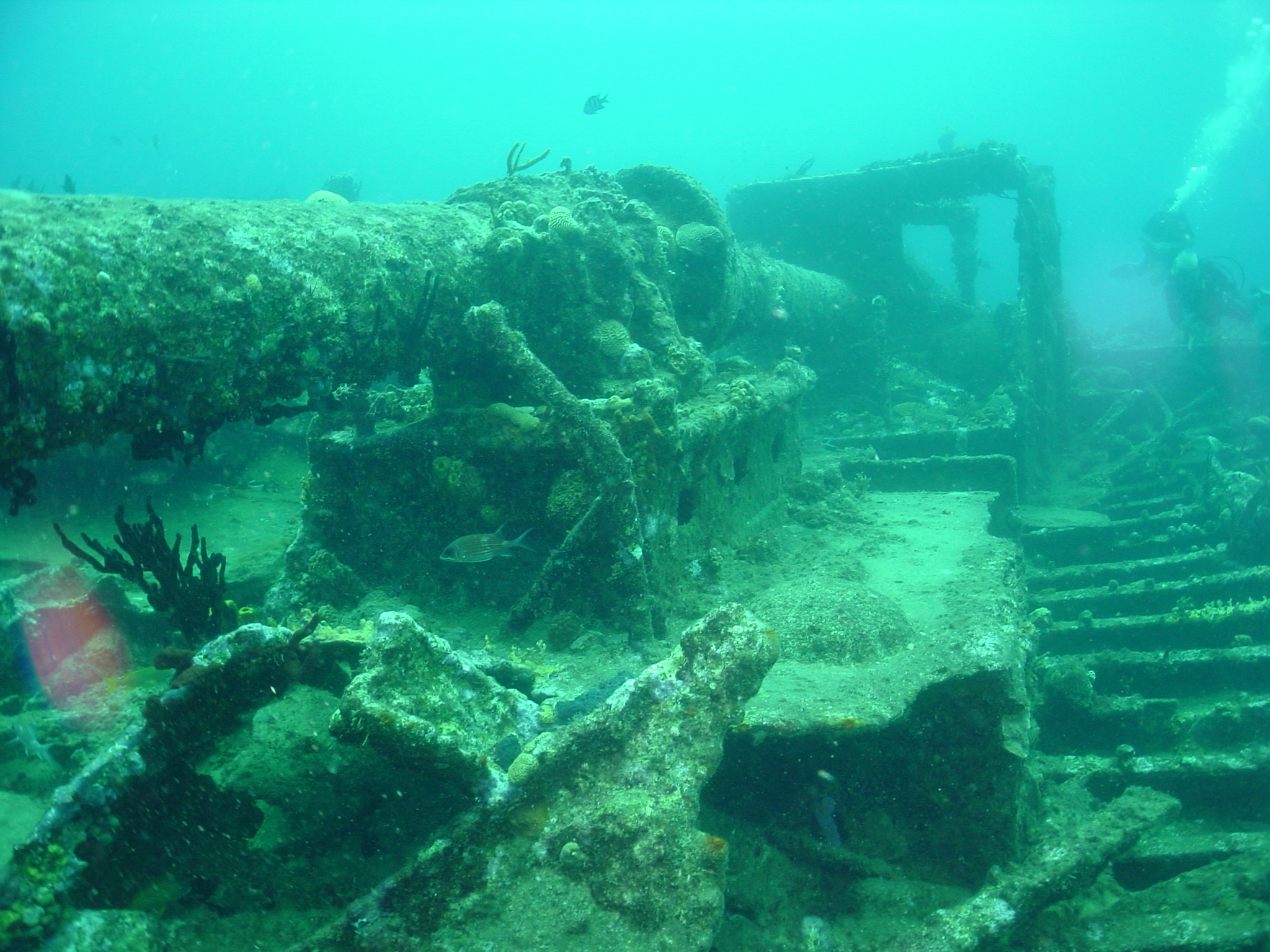
A 2003 photograph of the wreck of RMS Rhone. Only 25 of the approximately 145 people survived after it was wrecked by the storm.

At least 811 deaths occurred in total as a result of the hurricane, 600 on Saint Thomas (Danish West Indies - now Saint Thomas, the United States Virgin Islands) and 211 on Puerto Rico. On Saint Barthélemy, the cyclone destroyed crops and 55 homes while severely damaging 60 others.

On Tortola (British Virgin Islands), the storm reached its peak fury from noon to 2 pm and blew down one-third of the "miserable tenements". Deaths numbered 22 at Road Town, 2 on Peter Island, and 2 on Westland (now Soper's Hole). A letter from the Colonial Secretary of the Virgin Islands described Road Town as "two thirds ... in total ruin.", including the demolition of all places of worship, the schoolhouse, the hospital, and the jail. The hurricane destroyed nearly all crops on Tortola, while many residents were left without food or shelter, with 60 out of 123 residences wrecked. Only three homes remained standing on Peter Island.

Approximately 100 homes were destroyed on Virgin Gorda and 26 others on Jost Van Dyke. The hurricane drove ashore or otherwise wrecked 80 ships on Saint Thomas, including the RMS Rhone where a barometric pressure reading of 965 mbar (28.5 inHg) and winds of 74 mph (119 km/h) occurred. One ship that capsized, the steamer Columbian, held approximately $1 million to $2 million worth of cargo, while six of its occupants were lost. On land, the hurricane rendered thousands of people homeless. A correspondent to the St. Croix Avis described Charlotte Amalie as "frightful to look at", with "scarcely one building, whether old or new, left uncovered and many ... reduced to atoms." Roughly 600 people drowned throughout Saint Thomas.

All but one of the Puerto Rico's 67 towns were affected. A study led by Emery R. Boose, published by Ecological Monographs in 2004 indicated the hurricane produced damage equivalent to an F1 tornado on the Fujita scale in the eastern and central parts of the island. At San Juan, the storm wrecked the vessels Carmen, Josefina, and Rita and damaged many other ships, such as the Apolo, Fe, Joaquin, and Mary. Some towns experienced the destruction of or severe damage to every building and home, including at Aguas Buenas, Fajardo, and Humacao, while a correspondent to the New York Daily News described Maunabo as "a heap of ruins and the crops are all destroyed". New reports estimated that throughout the island, "one thousand houses have been laid in ruin and three thousand have been severely damaged"., sometimes including all dwellings on an entire street, "leaving the roadway hidden by the ruins". More than 3,600 families became destitute. The hurricane ruined agriculture of the island, with reportedly a loss of all coffee and sugar crops, causing a great economic crisis. Overall, 211 deaths and about 13 million Spanish escudos in damage occurred on Puerto Rico. The hurricane and various other factors contributed to the discontent on the island that erupted into the Grito de Lares of 1868.

It almost destroyed the city of Santo Domingo de Guzmán, Dominican Republic, where 200 persons died on that day. Winds and heavy rains removed thatch roofs of dwellings on some streets, leaving thousands of people homeless. Many trees also fell, blocking roads to the interior of the country. The government of the Dominican Republic allocated $25,000 for people impacted by the storm, but a New York Evening Post correspondent described this amount of monetary aid as "but a drop, and government and people are now poor alike".

== Name ==
The hurricane was given the name of the date it struck Puerto Rico, which occurred on October 29—the memorial day of Saint Narcissus of Jerusalem. This was a common practice prior to the introduction of standardized hurricane names in 1950. Other examples are the 1825 Santa Ana hurricane that made landfall on the Roman Catholic day of honor to Saint Anne, & the much similar 1932 San Ciprián hurricane that occurred on the feast day of Saint Cyprian.

== See also ==
- List of Atlantic hurricanes
- List of Puerto Rico hurricanes
- 1867 Virgin Islands earthquake and tsunami – Devastating event that struck the same region 20 days later
- 1932 San Ciprián hurricane – A near identical hurricane and runner-up in many of the storm's climatology record.
- Hurricane Maria – A more recent and intense hurricane that caused a humanitarian crisis in Puerto Rico.
