= RMS Douro =

British passenger liner

History

United Kingdom
- Name: RMS Douro
- Owner: Royal Mail Steam Packet Company
- Operator: Royal Mail Steam Packet Company
- Route: United Kingdom-West Indies (1865-1869); Southampton-Buenos Aires (1869-1882)
- Builder: Caird & Company, Greenock, Scotland
- Launched: 3 December 1864
- Fate: Sunk in collision 1 April 1882

General characteristics
- Type: Passenger ship
- Tonnage: 2,824 gross register tons
- Length: 326 ft (99.4 m)
- Beam: 40 ft (12.2 m)
- Propulsion: Sails and compound inverted steam engine, single screw, 500 ihp (373 kW)
- Speed: 12 knots (22 km/h)
- Capacity: 313 passengers
- Crew: 80

RMS Douro was a British passenger liner that served from 1865 to 1882 with the Royal Mail Steam Packet Company. She was sunk in a collision in 1882.

== Construction and career ==
Douro was an iron-hulled steamship built in 1865 by Caird & Company at Greenock, Scotland. She had eight watertight compartments. She could accommodate 253 first-class, 30 second-class, and 30 third-class passengers and had a crew of 80. She had lavish accommodations, and during her career developed a reputation for speed and reliability, with good food and music for her passengers.

Douro entered service in 1865, initially serving routes between the United Kingdom and the West Indies. Early in her career, she was running mates with RMS Rhone until Rhone sank in 1867.

In 1869, Douro switched to South American service on the Southampton, England-Buenos Aires, Argentina, route. As a Royal Mail Ship, she carried mail and newspapers under contract. She also often carried precious cargo, including gold and diamonds.

== Sinking ==
On 31 March 1882 Douro – bound from Buenos Aires to Southampton with stops at Brazil and Lisbon, Portugal – was running 90 minutes behind schedule when she departed Lisbon bound for Southampton on the final leg of the voyage. In order to make up time, she proceeded at full speed northward off the Portuguese and Spanish coasts.

On the evening of 1 April, Douro passed Spain's Cape Finisterre under a full moon. Her fourth officer noticed the Spanish steamer Yrurac Bat about two nautical miles (2.3 miles (3.7 km)) away, but assumed that the officer on the bridge had also spotted her and did not pass word of the sighting to him. The officer on the bridge only sighted Yrurac Bat later, when it was too late to avoid a collision, and at 22:45 hours on 1 April Yrurac Bat rammed Douro. Yrurac Bat′s bow cut two deep gashes in Douro′s starboard side.

The passengers and crew of Douro abandoned ship in a great hurry, and Douro sank 30 minutes after the collision in 1,500 feet (460 meters) of water. There were six fatalities among those aboard Douro, her captain, Ebenezer C. Kemp, and five other officers who went down with the ship, but the other 32 members of her crew and all 112 of her passengers survived. Yrurac Bat sank soon after Douro with the loss of another 53 lives.

The survivors were rescued soon after the disaster by the British Hull-registered steamer Hidalgo, which took them to A Coruña, Spain.

== Wreckage discovery and cargo salvage ==
In 1949, researcher Thomas Pickford left a cryptic note detailing coordinates for the lost wealth of the Douro in the Bay of Biscay. Forty years later, his son, marine researcher Nigel Pickford, discovered the note and spent a decade analyzing historical shipping records, insurer data, and survivor testimonies to narrow down an exploration zone. In 1992, Pickford partnered with Swedish deep-sea salvage explorer Sverker Hallstrom to locate the vessel.

The wreck was discovered in 1,500 feet (460 m) of water off Spain's Cape Finisterre. It was positively identified using a Remotely Operated Vehicle (ROV), which captured footage of an intact crockery plate wedged in the seabed bearing the official insignia of the Royal Mail Steam Packet Company.

Operating from a specialized salvage vessel, the Deep Sea Worker, Hallstrom's team executed a complicated deep-water operation that successfully recovered approximately 93% of the ship's gold cargo. This extensive haul included roughly 28,000 British gold sovereigns—mostly featuring the "Young Head" portrait of Queen Victoria struck at the London, Melbourne, and Sydney mints—alongside several numbered and unnumbered gold bars, as well as rare 18th- and 19th-century Brazilian and Portuguese gold coins.

== The "Douro Treasure" auctions ==
Following maritime salvage law, the recovered treasure was transported to Jersey and officially declared to the authorities, where it was held for the statutory period of a year and a day before being released. The collection was subsequently cataloged by numismatic specialists Spink & Son and sold at a landmark London auction held in association with Christie's on 20–21 November 1996. While around 10,000 of the finest coins and artifacts were sold across 1,713 lots during the initial sale, the remaining sovereigns were gradually released onto the numismatic market over the following decade via private treaty and secondary sales.
