= RMS Rhone =

Royal Mail Ship wrecked off Salt Island in the British Virgin Islands in a hurricane

Coordinates: 18.3687°N 64.5356°W

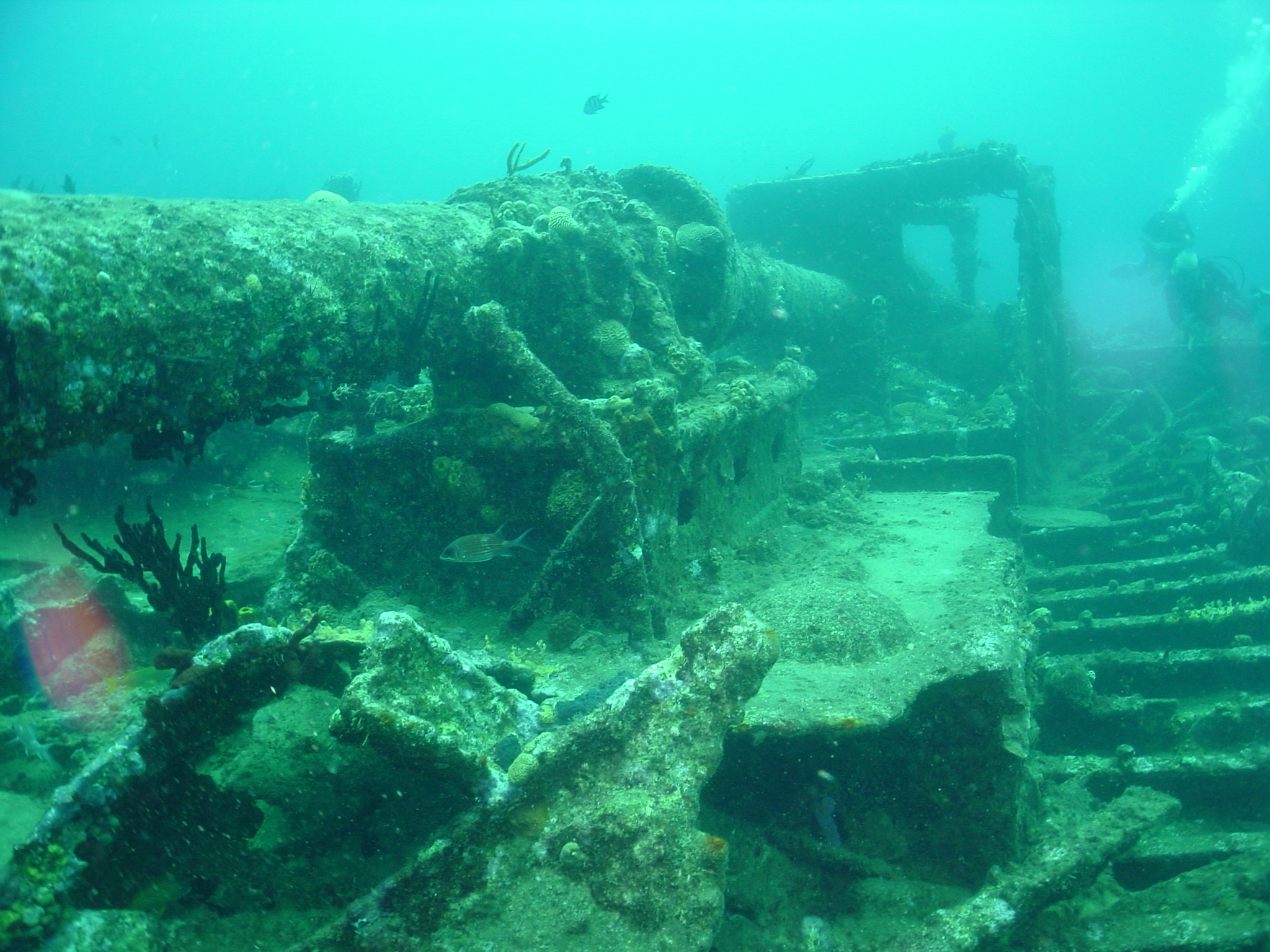
- The wreck of RMS Rhone

History

United Kingdom
- Name: RMS Rhone
- Namesake: River Rhone
- Owner: Royal Mail Steam Packet Co
- Operator: Royal Mail Steam Packet Co
- Port of registry: (United Kingdom) Southampton
- Route: 1865–67: Southampton – Rio de Janeiro; 1867: Southampton – Caribbean
- Ordered: June 1863
- Builder: Millwall Iron Works
- Launched: 11 February 1865
- Maiden voyage: 9 October 1865
- Out of service: 29 October 1867
- Fate: Sunk by Hurricane

General characteristics
- Type: passenger liner
- Tonnage: 2,738 GRT
- Length: 310 ft (94 m)
- Beam: 40 ft (12 m)
- Installed power: 500 NHP
- Propulsion: compound steam engine; screw
- Speed: 14 knots (26 km/h)
- Capacity: Passengers: 253 1st class, 30 2nd class, 30 3rd class
- Notes: sister ship: Douro

RMS Rhone was a UK Royal Mail Ship owned by the Royal Mail Steam Packet Company (RMSP). She was wrecked off the coast of Salt Island in the British Virgin Islands on 29 October 1867 in a hurricane, killing 123 people. She is now a popular Caribbean wreck dive site.

== History ==
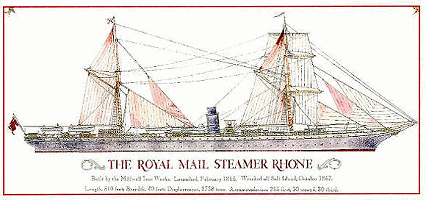
RMS Rhone

RMSP ships carried mail, passengers, horses, and cargo on regular scheduled routes. Its first services had been between Southampton and the Caribbean, but in 1851 it added a new route between Southampton and Rio de Janeiro. This growing trade, and a number of ships lost at sea, created a need for new ships.

In June 1863 RMSP ordered Rhone from the Millwall Iron Works on the Isle of Dogs, London and her sister ship Douro from Caird & Company in Greenock. The pair was initially to work the Rio de Janeiro route. They were similar but not identical. Both were handsome ships, but Rhone was considered to have slightly finer lines.

At this time the Admiralty supervised Royal Mail Ship contracts. During building the Admiralty surveyor criticised Rhone's bulkheads and water tight compartments. Revisions were made, and the ship was completed to the surveyor's satisfaction.

Rhone had an iron hull, was 310 feet (94 m) long, had a 40-foot (12 m) beam and 2,738 GRT. She was a sail-steamer, rigged as a two-masted brig. Her compound steam engine developed 500 NHP and gave her a speed of 14 knots (26 km/h) on her sea trials. In her contract the ship cost £25 17s 8d per ton and her engine cost £24,500.

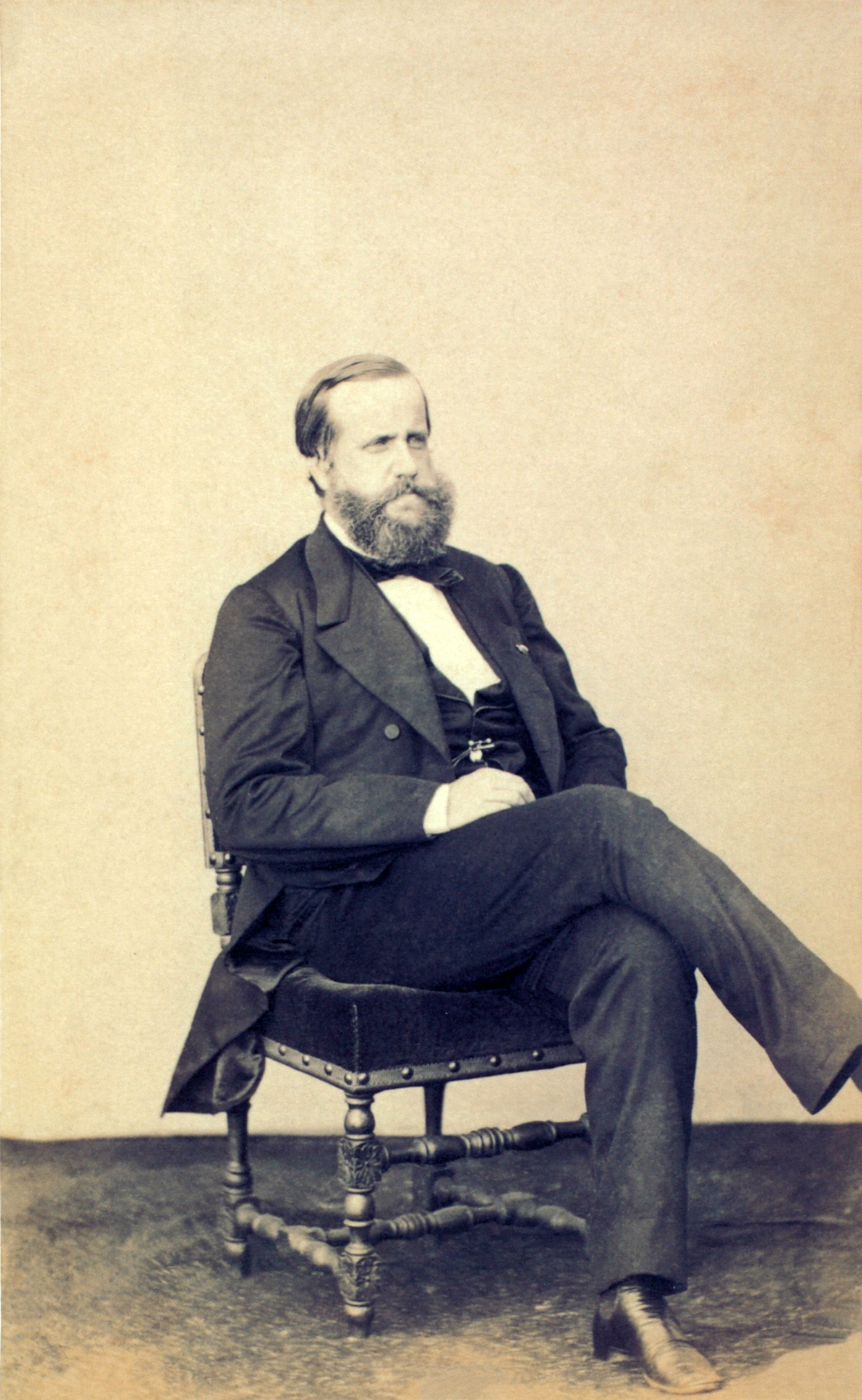
Emperor Pedro II in 1865, the year he visited Rhone's engine room

Rhone was an innovative ship. She had a bronze propeller, which was only the second ever made of this alloy. She had also a surface condenser in order to save and re-use water in her boilers and steam engine. She was the first ship so equipped to visit Brazil, so in port in 1865 the Emperor of Brazil, Pedro II, came aboard and visited her engine room to see it.

Rhone's passenger capacity was 253 first class, 30 second class and 30 third class. On 9 October 1865 she left Southampton on her maiden voyage to Brazil. At first she suffered from overheated bearings, but once this was resolved she became a fast and reliable ship. Her next five voyages were also to Brazil.

Rhone proved her worth by weathering several severe storms. One storm in 1866 destroyed the cutter and two lifeboats on her port side, damaged the cutter and the mail boat on her starboard side, damaged much of her deck furniture, killed two horses and broke one sailor's leg.

In January 1867 Rhone made her final voyage to Brazil, after which RMSP transferred her to the Caribbean route, which at the time was more lucrative and prestigious.

== Sinking ==
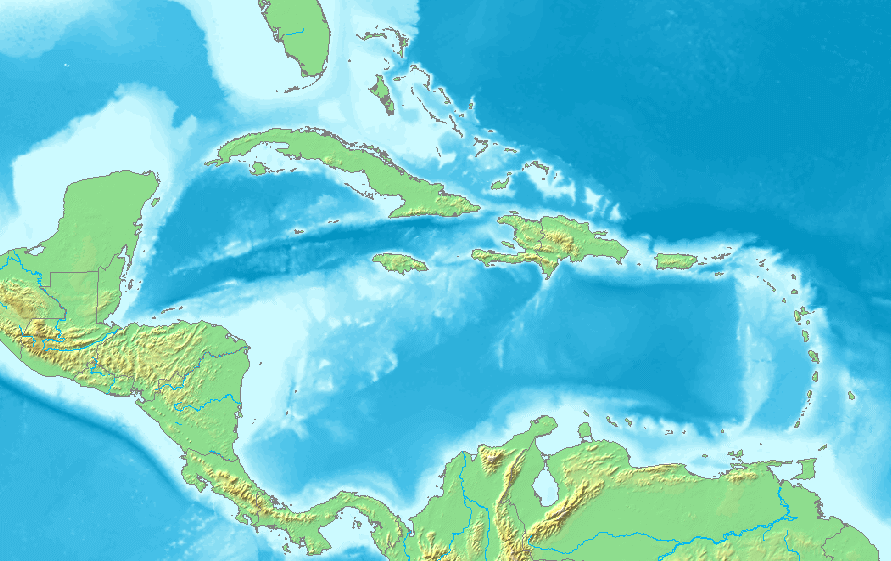
Position of Rhone's wreck in the British Virgin Islands

On 19 October 1867 Rhone drew alongside RMS Conway in Great Harbour, Peter Island for bunkering. The original coaling station they needed had been moved from the then Danish island of St. Thomas due to an outbreak of yellow fever.

On the day of the sinking, Rhone's Master, Frederick Woolley, was slightly worried by the dropping barometer and darkening clouds, but because it was October and hurricane season was thought to be over, Rhone and Conway stayed in Great Harbour. The storm which subsequently hit was later known as the San Narciso Hurricane and retrospectively categorised as a Category 3 hurricane on the Saffir–Simpson Hurricane Scale. The first half of the storm passed without much event or damage, but the ferocity of the storm worried the captains of Conway and Rhone, as their anchors had dragged and they worried that when the storm came back after the eye of the storm had passed over, they would be driven onto the shore of Peter Island.

They decided to transfer the passengers from Conway to the "unsinkable" Rhone; Conway was then to head for Road Harbour and Rhone would make for open sea. As was normal practice at the time, the passengers in Rhone were tied into their beds to prevent them being injured in the stormy seas.

Conway got away before Rhone but was caught by the tail end of the storm, and eventually foundered off the south side of Tortola. But Rhone struggled to get free as her anchor was caught fast. It was ordered to be cut loose, and lies in Great Harbour to this day, with its chain wrapped around the same coral head that trapped it a century and a half ago. Time was now critical, and Captain Woolley decided that it would be best to try to escape to the shelter of open sea by the easiest route, between Black Rock Point of Salt Island and Dead Chest Island. Between those two islands lay Blonde Rock, an underwater reef which was normally a safe depth of 25 feet (7.6 m), but during hurricane swells, there was a risk that Rhone might founder on that. The Captain took a conservative course, giving Blonde Rock (which cannot be seen from the surface) a wide berth.

However, just as Rhone was passing Black Rock Point, less than 250 yards (230 m) from safety, the second half of the hurricane came around from the south. The winds shifted to the opposite direction and Rhone was thrown directly into Black Rock Point. It is said that the initial lurch of the crash sent Captain Woolley overboard, never to be seen again. Local legend says that his teaspoon can still be seen lodged into the wreck itself. Whether or not it is his, a teaspoon is clearly visible entrenched in the wreck's coral. The ship broke in two, and cold seawater made contact with her hot boilers which had been running at full steam, causing them to explode.

The ship sank swiftly, the bow section in 80 feet (24 m) of water, the stern in 30 feet (9 m). Of the approximately 145 crew and passengers on board, twenty-five people survived the wreck. The bodies of many of the sailors were buried in a nearby cemetery on Salt Island which remained relatively unchanged until being destroyed by Hurricane Irma in 2017. A long-held belief that due to her mast sticking out of the water, and her shallow depth, she was deemed a hazard by the Royal Navy in the 1950s and her stern section was blown up, was refuted by Twice She Struck author Dr. Michael D. Kent. Kent's research indicated that Rhone was blown up during salvage by hardhat diver Jeremiah Murphy and that the bow section, made famous by Jacqueline Bisset, had probably rolled during another hurricane in 1924.

== As dive site ==
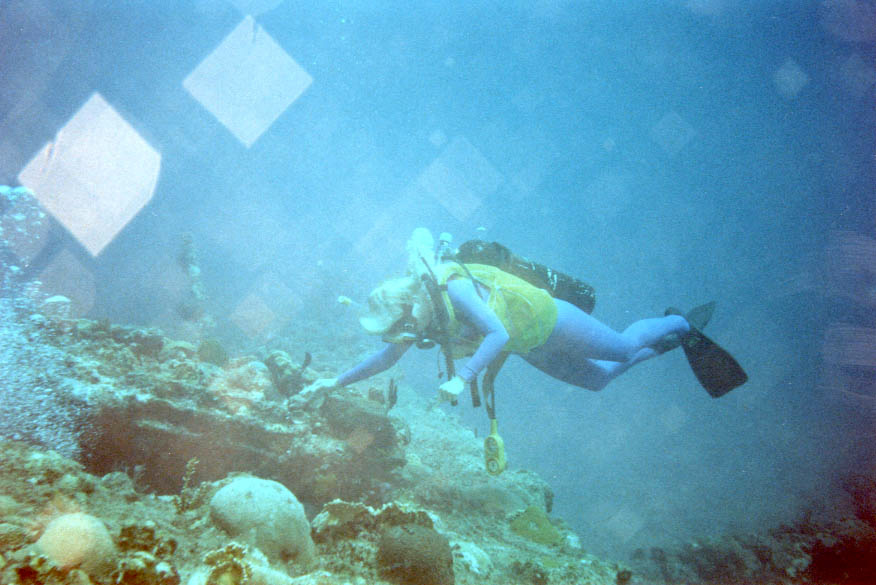
Diver exploring the Rhone

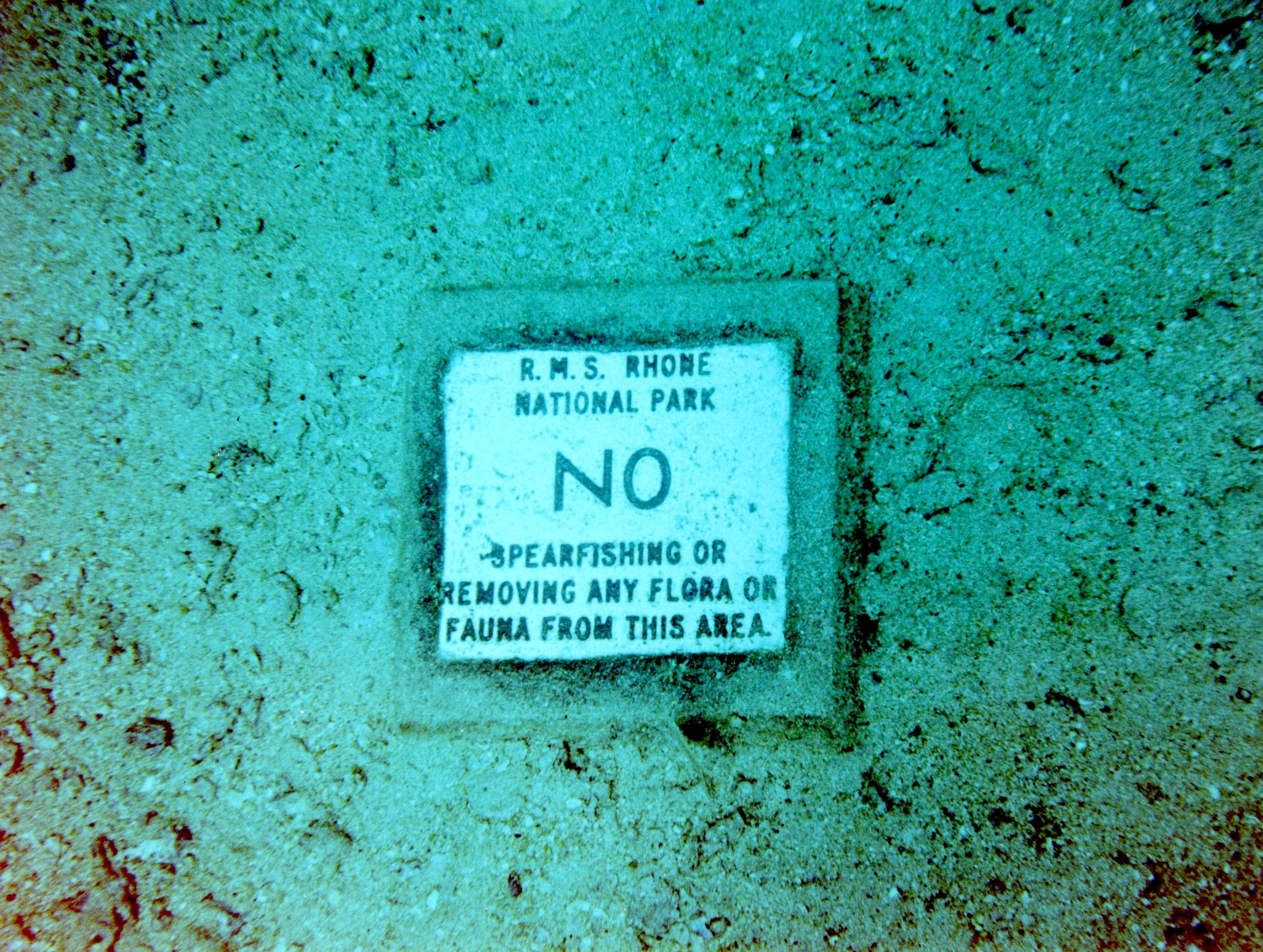
Sign on the ocean floor, 25 metres deep, at RMS Rhone National Park

Rhone is now a popular dive site, and the area around her was turned into a national park in 1980.

Rhone has received a number of citations and awards over the years as one of the top recreational wreck dives in the Caribbean, both for its historical interest and teeming marine life, and also because of the open and relatively safe nature of the wreckage. Very little of the wreckage is still enclosed, and where overhead environments do exist, they are large and roomy and have openings at either end permitting a swim through, so there is no real penetration diving for which divers usually undergo advanced training.

Her bow section is still relatively intact, and although the wooden decks have rotted away, she still provides an excellent swim-through for divers. Her entire iron hull is encrusted with coral and overrun by fishes, and the cracks and crevices of her wreckage provide excellent habitats for lobsters, eels, and octopuses. Her wreckage was also featured in the 1977 filming of The Deep, including the scene of Jacqueline Bisset diving in a T-shirt.

The wreck has been well treated over the years. There used to be a full set of wrenches (spanners), still visible on the deep part (each wrench being about 4 feet (1.2 m) long and weighing over 100 pounds (45 kg)). In recent decades the largest of these were stolen by a collector, leaving only the smaller wrenches. Also remaining are a few brass portholes and even a silver teaspoon. The remaining wrenches are under 55 feet (17 m) of water. Similarly the wreck features the "lucky porthole", a brass porthole in the stern section which survived the storm intact and remains shiny by divers rubbing it for good luck. This porthole is considered "lucky" because the glass still survives. For many years a popular resident of the wreck was a 500-pound (230 kg) Goliath grouper, but two ex-pat fishermen with spear guns killed it despite spear guns being illegal for non-nationals and the area being a national park. Today the wreck is visited by hundreds of tourists every day, most of whom are more circumspect in their treatment of the site.

The wreck's maximum depth is 85 feet (26 m) of water.

The Rhone National Park was closed for a short time from 29 August 2011 because the container ship Tropical Sun had run aground on rocks near Salt Island very near the wreck.

== Pictures ==
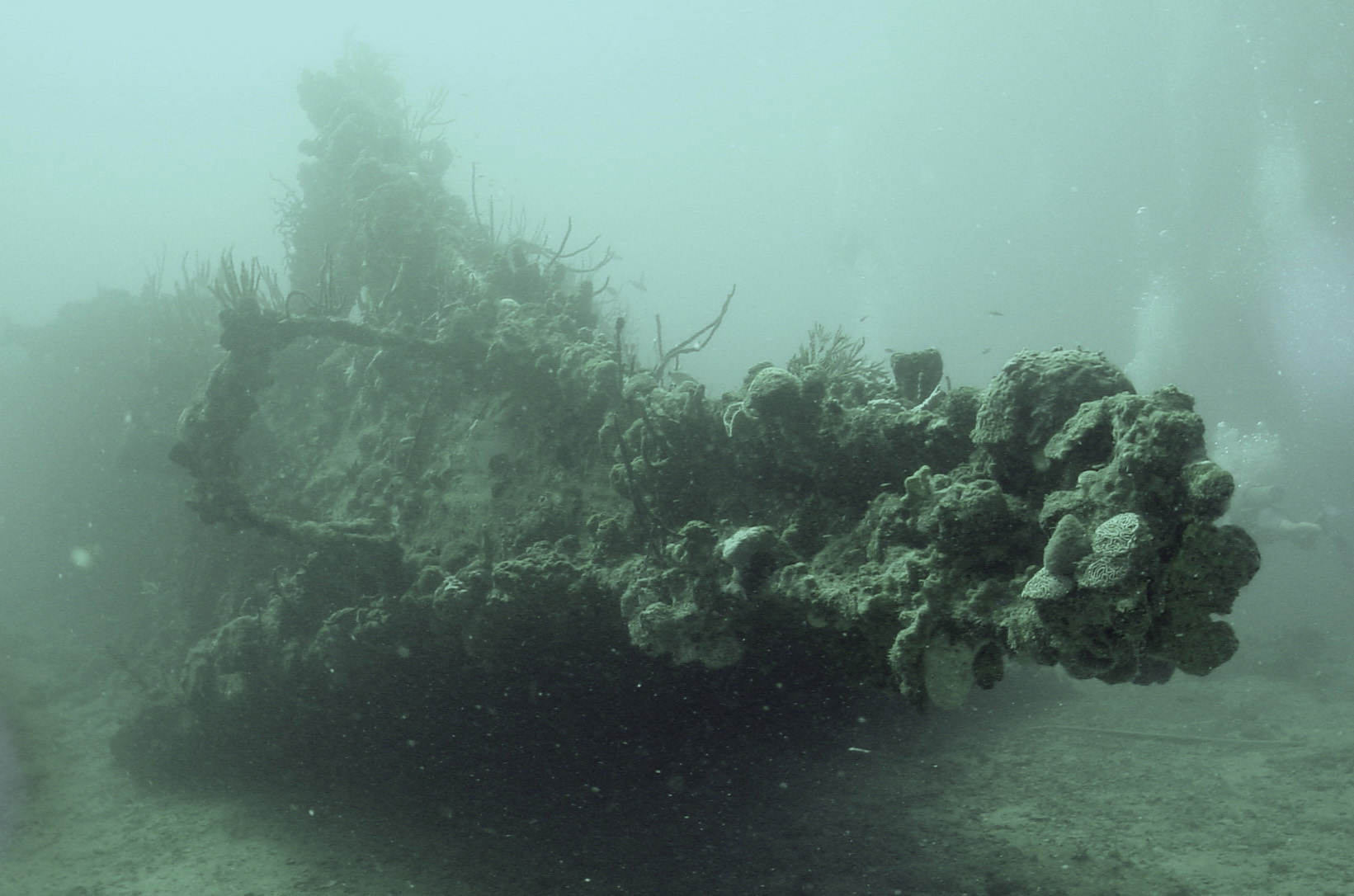
Wreck of the Rhone

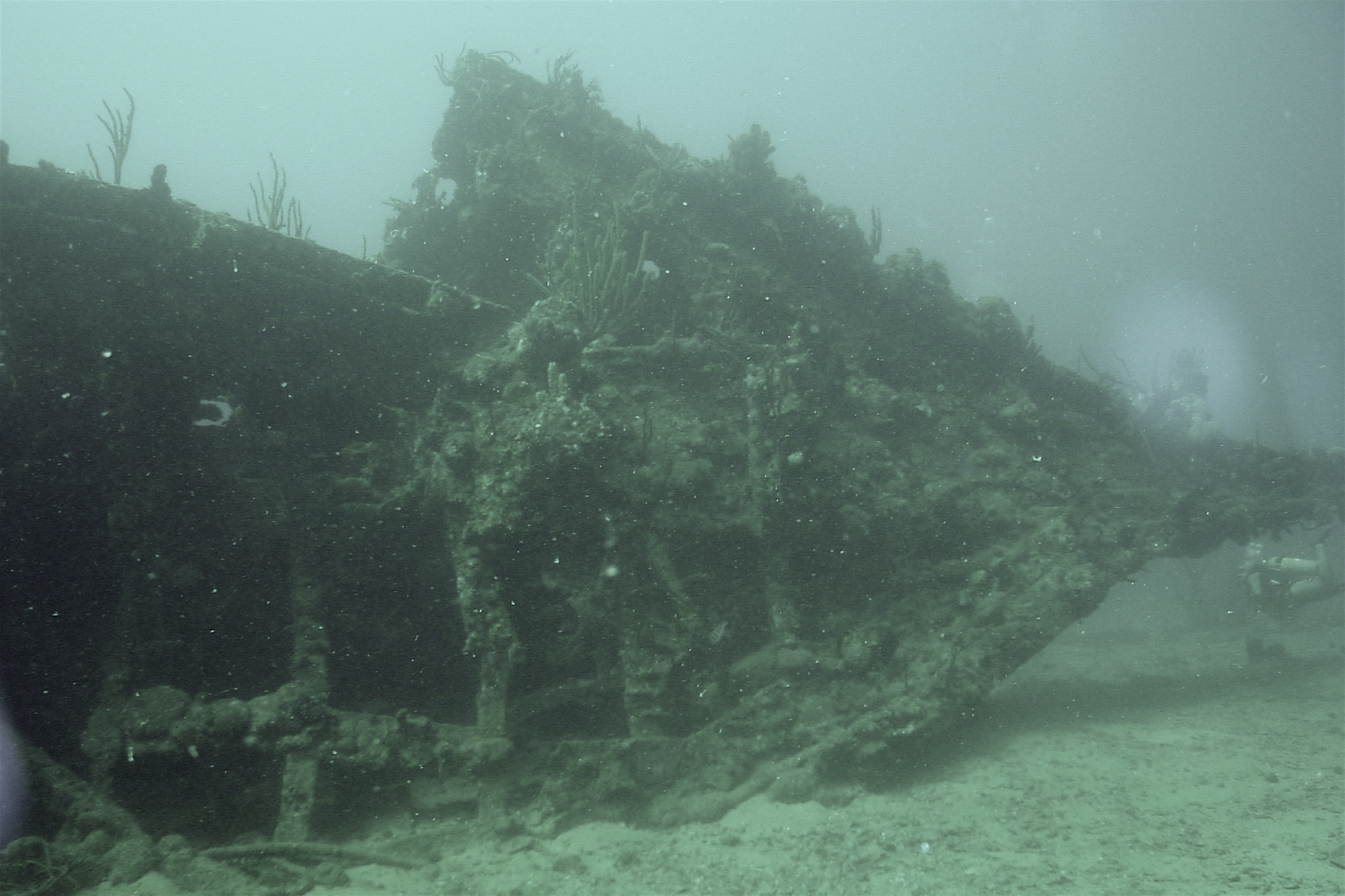
Wreck of the Rhone

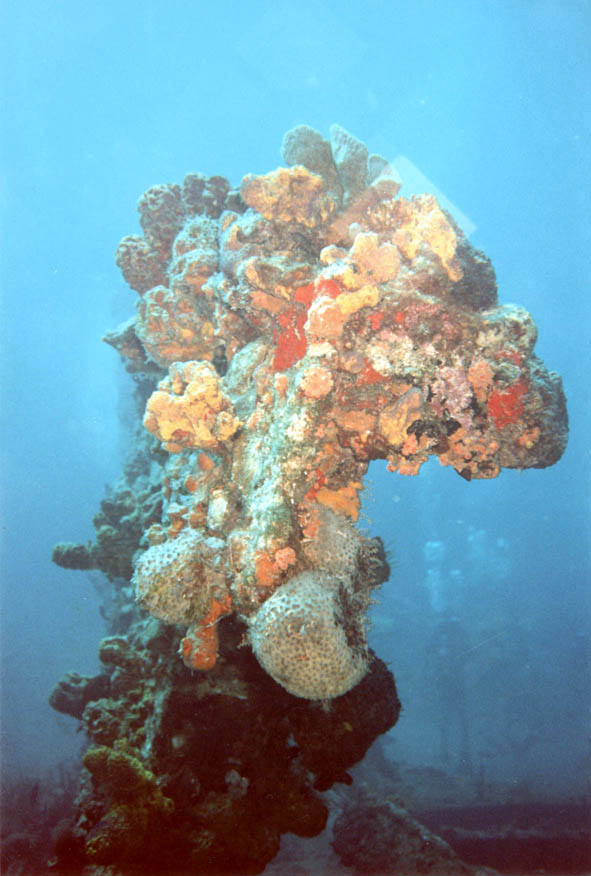
Coral growth on the Rhone

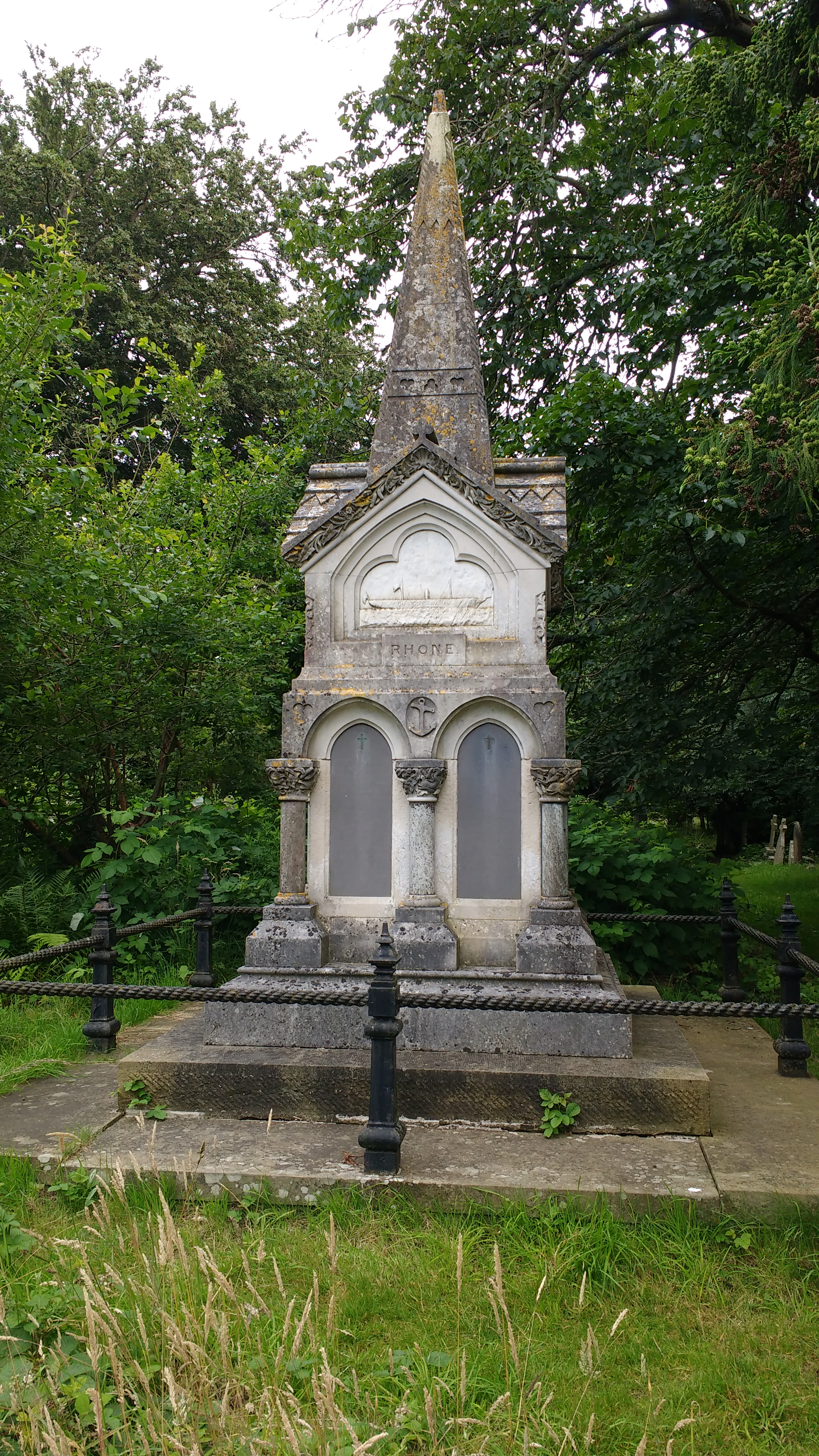
Memorial to the sailors of Southampton who perished aboard the RMS Rhone and RMS Wye which both sank during the same hurricane

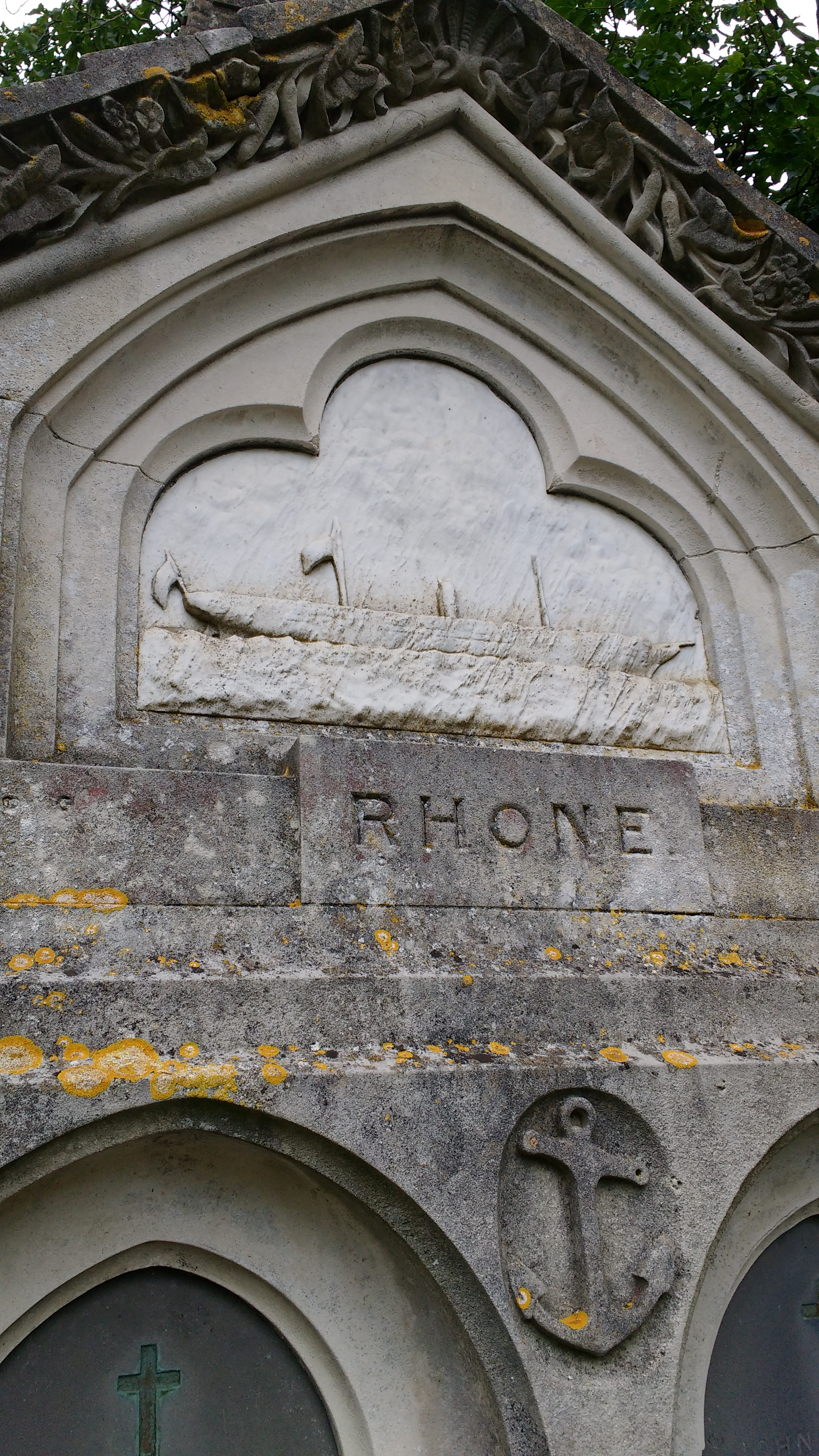
Detail of the bas relief illustration of the Rhone from the memorial in Southampton Old Cemetery

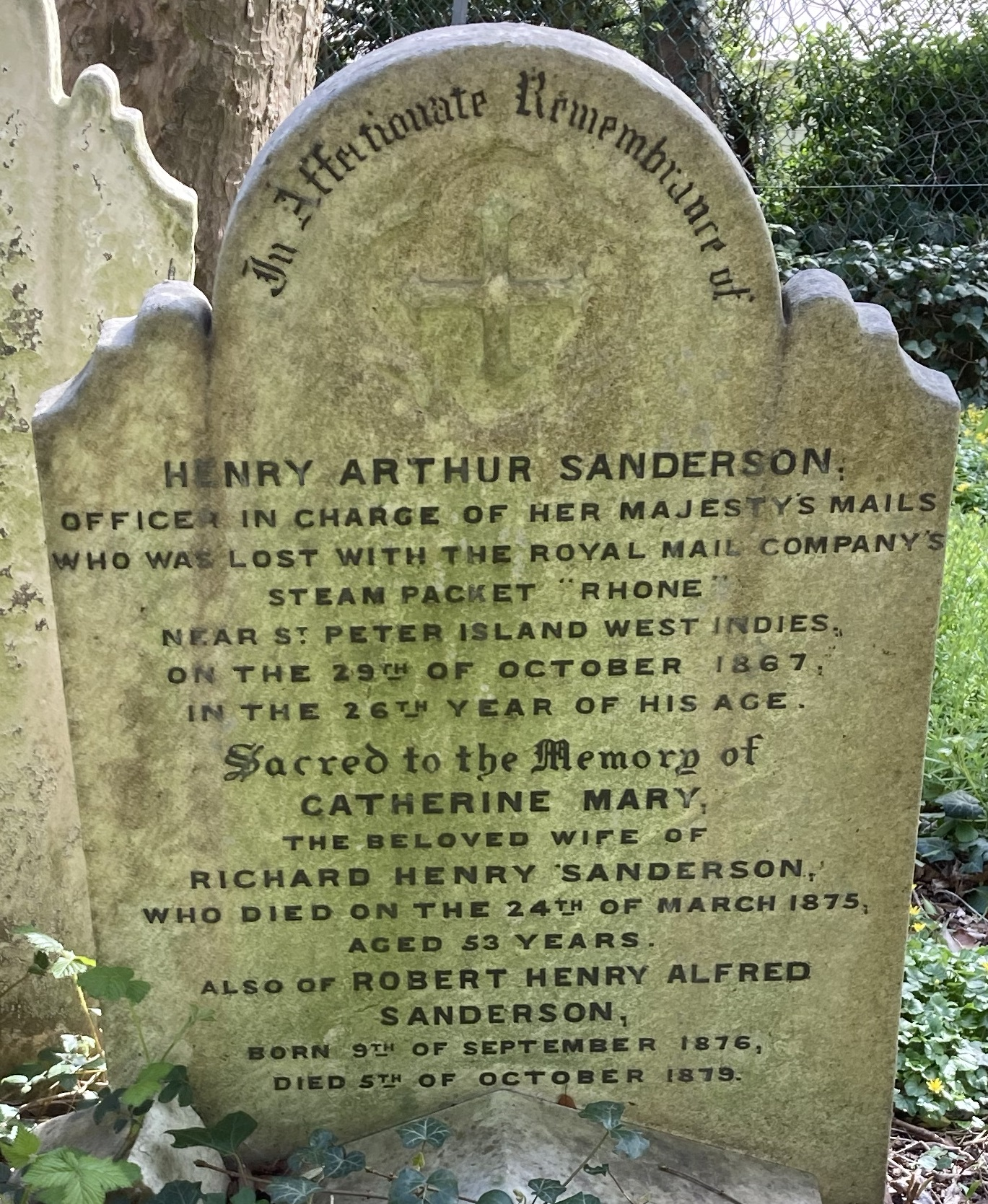
Family grave in Highgate Cemetery of Henry Arthur Sanderson, officer in charge of mails on RMS Rhone

== Sources ==
- Nicol, Stuart (2001a). MacQueen's Legacy; A History of the Royal Mail Line. Vol. One. Brimscombe Port and Charleston, SC: Tempus Publishing. pp. 74–76. ISBN 0-7524-2118-2.
- Nicol, Stuart (2001b). MacQueen's Legacy; Ships of the Royal Mail Line. Vol. Two. Brimscombe Port and Charleston, SC: Tempus Publishing. pp. 58–64. ISBN 0-7524-2119-0.
- Martelli, Joan (2017) The Law of Storms: The true story of the RMS Rhone and the great Virgin Islands hurricane of 1867. ISBN 978-90-827838-1-0
