= Hurricanes in the Virgin Islands =

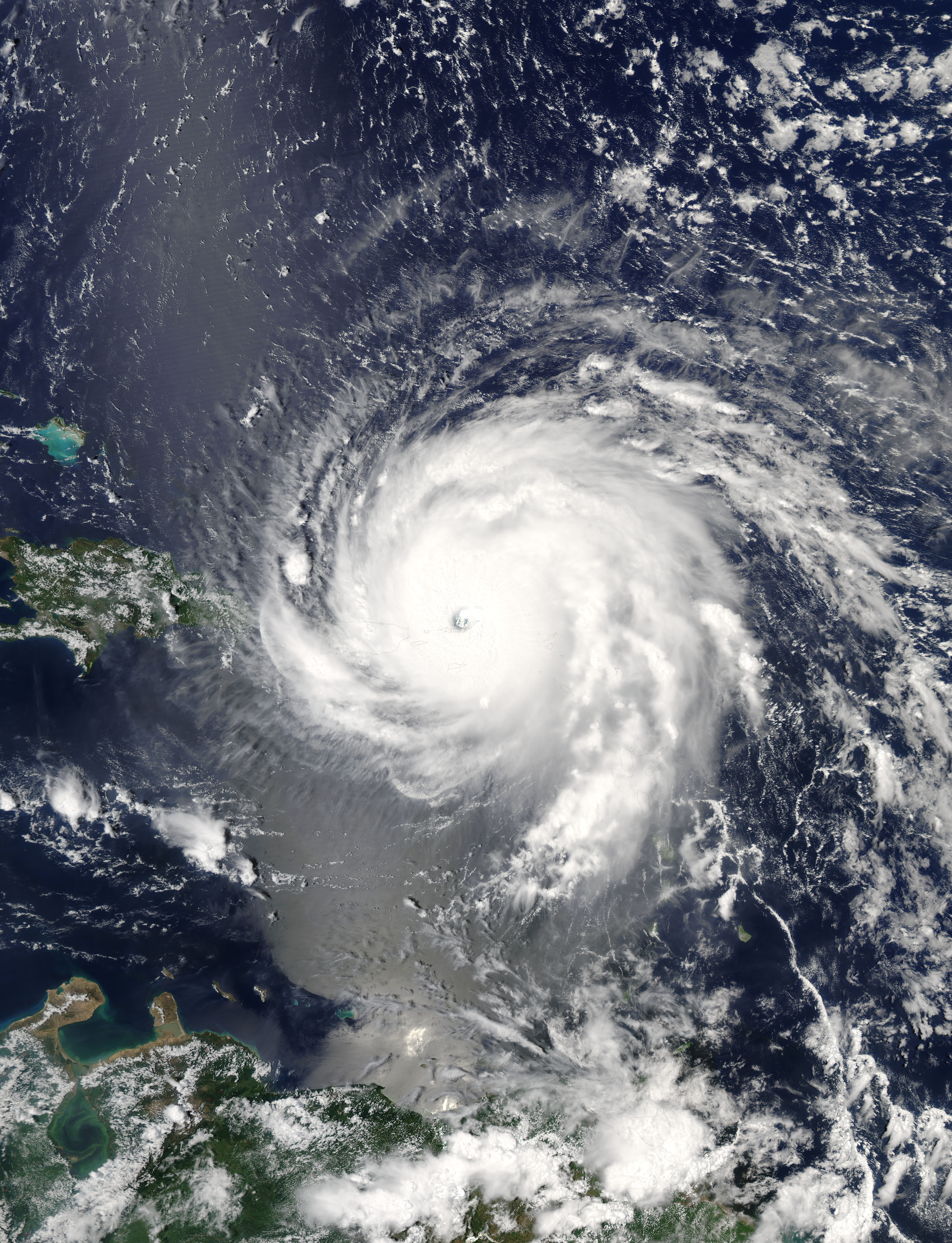
Hurricane Irma is the most powerful tropical cyclone ever recorded in the Virgin Islands.

The Virgin Islands (Spanish: Islas Vírgenes) are an archipelago in the Caribbean Sea. The islands fall into three different political jurisdictions:

- British Virgin Islands, a British overseas territory,
- United States Virgin Islands, an unincorporated territory of the United States,
- Spanish Virgin Islands, the easternmost islands of the Commonwealth of Puerto Rico, itself an unincorporated territory of the United States.

This list includes all tropical cyclones that have struck one or all of the above territories. For the period that reasonably reliable records exist, tropical storms strike the Territory on average approximately once every 8 years, although that includes strikes which only affected the northernmost (and lightly populated) island of Anegada.

In the 20th century, the Virgin Islands experienced 13 hurricanes, but they came largely in two clusters. The Territory experienced five hurricanes from 1916 to 1932 (inclusive), and then only one during the next 57 years. But then between 1989 and 1999 (inclusive) seven hurricanes struck the Territory (including six in the space of four years from 1995–1999). That was then followed by another 11-year hiatus without any hurricane strikes.

Twice in recent times the territories have experienced a rapid double-strike: in 1995 Hurricane Luis was followed nine days later by Hurricane Marilyn, and in 2017 Hurricane Irma was followed 14 days later by Hurricane Maria.

Year	Hurricane name	Category	Notes
Modern era
2019	Hurricane Dorian	1	Eye passed over St Thomas. Some Western islands experienced low hurricane-force winds. No deaths or serious damage reported.
2017	Hurricane Maria	5	Eye passed over the south of Saint Croix. Caused catastrophic damage. Struck two weeks after Hurricane Irma. In the intervening period another major hurricane (Hurricane Jose) narrowly missed the Territory.
2017	Hurricane Irma	5	Strongest Atlantic forming hurricane ever recorded. Eye passed directly over Virgin Gorda, Tortola and Jost Van Dyke. Caused 4 deaths and catastrophic damage.
2011	Hurricane Irene	3	]. .
2010	Hurricane Earl	1	Eye passed to the north of Anegada. Caused only slight damage.
2008	Hurricane Omar	3	. .
1999	Hurricane Lenny	1	Known locally as "wrong-way" Lenny, it is the only known Caribbean forming hurricane to strike the Territory. Passed well to the south, causing only light damage.
1999	Hurricane Jose	1	Eye passed very close to the south of the Territory. Caused only light damage.
1998	Hurricane Georges	2	Eye passed to the south. Caused moderate damage.
1996	Hurricane Bertha	1	Eye passed directly over the Territory. Caused moderate damage.
1995	Hurricane Marilyn	1	Eye passed to the north. Caused catastrophic damage leaving 20% of the population homeless. Struck nine days after Hurricane Luis.
1995	Hurricane Luis	2	Eye passed to the north. Caused moderate damage.
1989	Hurricane Hugo	4	First hurricane to strike the main island of Tortola in over 50 years. Eye passed over the south of Saint Croix. Caused significant damage.
Early 20th century
1960	Hurricane Donna	2	Eye passed to the north of Anegada.
1932	San Ciprián hurricane	3	Eye passed narrowly to the south of the Territory. Few contemporaneous reports of the extent of the damage.
1931	San Nicolas Hurricane	2	Eye passed directly over the Territory. Few contemporaneous reports of the extent of the damage.
1924	"Gale of 1924"	2–3	Eye passed directly over the Territory. The storm was well documented by Agnes "Cuckoo" Hancock, wife of Commissioner Otho Lewis Hancock. Her letters are preserved in the Government House museum.
1922	Unnamed hurricane	2	Eye passed directly over Anegada.
1916	Unnamed hurricane	2–3	Eye passed to the west of the Territory. Possibly a non-Cape Verde hurricane.
Late 19th century
1899	Unnamed hurricane	2	Eye passes to the north of Anegada. No other island significantly affected.
1894	Unnamed hurricane	2	
1889	Hurricane San Martín	2	
1876	San Felipe hurricane	3	
1871	Hurricane Santa Juana	2	Eye passed directly over the Territory.
1867	San Narciso hurricane	3	Eye passed directly over the Territory. Sank the RMS Rhone. Caused 26 deaths on land, and an estimated further 123 died on the Rhone.
1866	Great Bahamas Hurricane of 1866	1	Eye passed to the north of Anegada, and only that island was affected.
1852	Unnamed hurricane	1	
Pre-1850
Prior to 1850 hurricane reports are sporadic and not generally reliable. Only well known or observed storms are generally recorded. Because the British Virgin Islands were sparsely populated during this period, records often do not indicate even if well-known storms struck the Territory.
1819	Hurricane San Mateo	Unknown	Reportedly destroyed the original St George's Anglican church in Road Town.
1780	Great Hurricane of 1780	Unknown	Eye is believed to have passed some distance to the south the Territory. No deaths are recorded, but a Quaker settlement was reported as abandoned because of the hurricane.
