= 1998 in the British Virgin Islands =

- Decades
- See also: Other events of 1998; Timeline of BVI history

Events from the year 1998 in the British Virgin Islands.

== Incumbents ==
- Governor: Frank Savage
- Chief Minister: Ralph T. O'Neal

== September ==
- 21 September 1998 - Hurricane Georges strikes the British Virgin Islands.
