= 1999 in the British Virgin Islands =

- Decades
- See also: Other events of 1999; Timeline of BVI history

Events from the year 1999 in the British Virgin Islands.

== Incumbents ==
- Governor: Frank Savage
- Chief Minister: Ralph T. O'Neal

== May ==
- 17 May 1999 - Chief Minister Ralph T. O'Neal leads the incumbent Virgin Islands Party to victory in the general election.

== October ==
- 21 October 1999 - Hurricane Jose strikes the British Virgin Islands.

== November ==
- 18 November 1999 - Hurricane Lenny strikes the British Virgin Islands, peaking at winds of 84 mph. It caused erosion which effected the Sir Francis Drake Highway, a landslide in the Cox Heath area, and a loss of 11.32 days of production.
