= 1996 in the British Virgin Islands =

- Decades
- See also: Other events of 1996; Timeline of BVI history

Events from the year 1996 in the British Virgin Islands.

== Incumbents ==
- Governor: David Mackilligin
- Chief Minister: Ralph T. O'Neal

== July ==
- 8 July 1996 – Hurricane Bertha strikes the British Virgin Islands.
