= 1867 in the British Virgin Islands =

- Decades
- See also: Other events of 1867; Timeline of BVI history

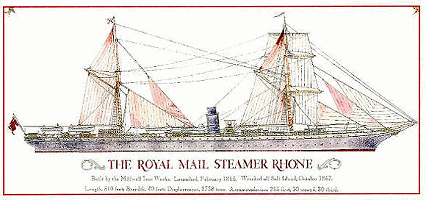
The RMS Rhone, sunk on 29 October 1867 in a hurricane, killing 123 people.

Events from the year 1867 in the British Virgin Islands.

== October ==
- 29 October 1867 - The Territory is hit by what would later be known as the San Narciso hurricane. Approximately 600 people died in neighbouring St. Thomas, and approximately 26 residents in the British Virgin Islands. Additionally the RMS Rhone is sunk with the loss of an estimated 123 lives.
- 18 November 1867 - Twenty days after the devastating hurricane, a magnitude 7.5 earthquake struck the Anegada Passage, generating a tsunami which advanced towards the islands.
