= 2010 in the British Virgin Islands =

- Decades
- See also: Other events of 2010; Timeline of BVI history

Events from the year 2010 in the British Virgin Islands.

== Incumbents ==
- Governor:
  - until August 5: David Pearey
  - August 5-August 20: V. Inez Archibald (acting)
  - starting August 20: William Boyd McCleary
- Premier: Ralph T. O'Neal

== Events ==
=== August ===
- 30 August 2010 - Hurricane Earl strikes the British Virgin Islands, breaking an 11-year hiatus from hurricanes.
