= 1989 in the British Virgin Islands =

- Decades
- See also: Other events of 1989; Timeline of BVI history

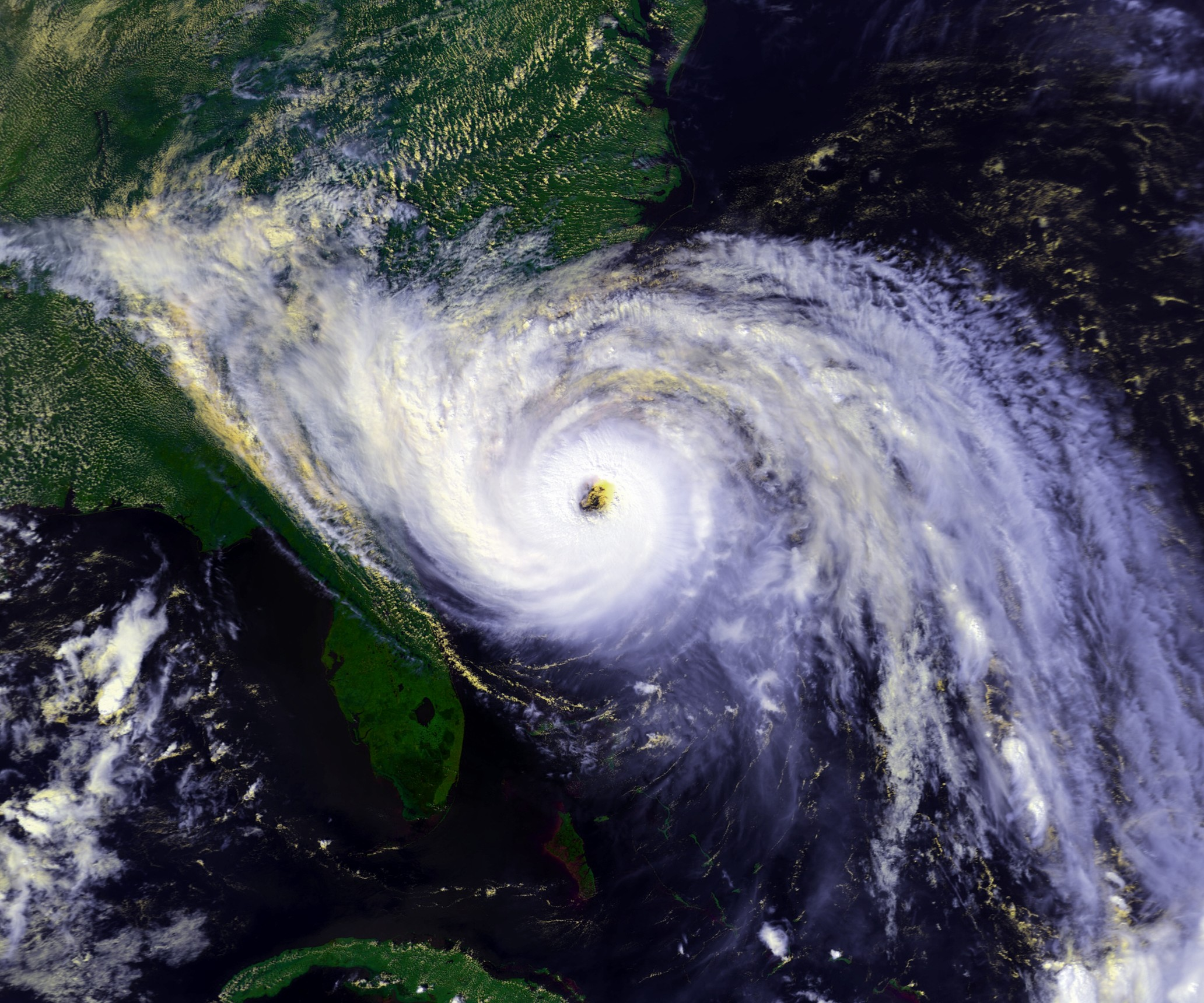
In September 1989 Hurricane Hugo became the first hurricane to strike the Territory in over 50 years.

Events from the year 1989 in the British Virgin Islands.

== Incumbents ==
- Governor: Mark Herdman
- Chief Minister: H. Lavity Stoutt

== September ==
- 18 September 1989 - Hurricane Hugo strikes leaving widespread damage. It is the first time hurricane-force winds hit the Territory since 1932.
