= 1995 in the British Virgin Islands =

- Decades
- See also: Other events of 1995; Timeline of BVI history

Events from the year 1995 in the British Virgin Islands.

== Incumbents ==
- Governor: Peter Penfold then David Mackilligin
- Chief Minister:
  - H. Lavity Stoutt (until 14 May)
  - Ralph T. O'Neal (starting 14 May)

== February ==
- 20 February 1995 - Chief Minister Lavity Stoutt leads the incumbent Virgin Islands Party to victory in the general election, winning a record fifth term as Chief Minister.

== May ==
- 14 May 1995 - Chief Minister Lavity Stoutt dies. He was the first and longest serving Chief Minister, winning a total of five general elections as party leader. At the time of his death he was also the longest serving Parliamentarian in the Caribbean region. Ralph O'Neal succeeded him as both party leader and Chief Minister.

== September ==
- 6 September 1995 - Hurricane Luis strikes the British Virgin Islands.
- 15 September 1995 - Hurricane Marilyn strikes the Territory, a mere nine days after Hurricane Luis.
