= List of Puerto Rico hurricanes (2000–present) =

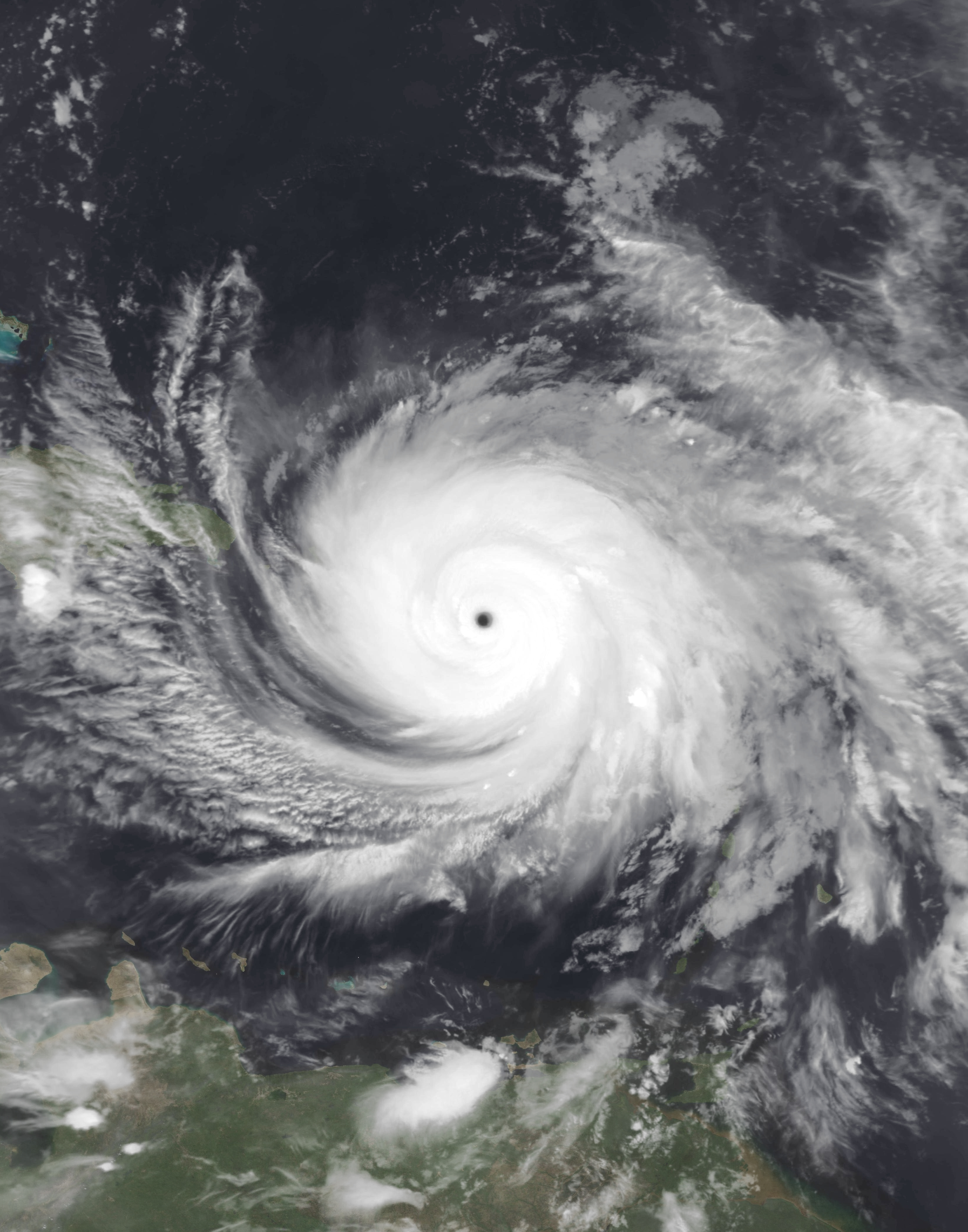
Hurricane Maria near peak intensity to the southeast of Puerto Rico on September 20, 2017

The list of Puerto Rico hurricanes from the 21st century has been marked by several devastating North Atlantic hurricanes, tropical or subtropical cyclones, their remnants, or their precursors have affected the U.S. territory of Puerto Rico. Every year included has at least one tropical cyclone affecting the territory.

The strongest hurricane to hit the territory during the time period was Hurricane Maria, which was a Category 4, on the Saffir–Simpson scale, the second-highest category on the scale. Maria was the strongest hurricane to strike the territory since 1928 Okeechobee hurricane.

== 2000 ==
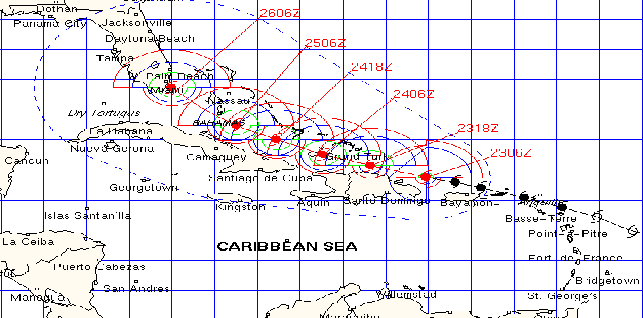
A forecast map of Hurricane Debby directly showing its path north of Puerto Rico

- August 23 – Hurricane Debby dropped up to 12 inches (30.5 mm) of rainfall across Puerto Rico in less than 48 hours, causing mudslides and damage to bridges and roads. There were 406 homes affected from the flooding, 5 of which were moderate to severely damaged. Losses in Puerto Rico reached $501,000, primarily in the Caguas municipality. The storm was also indirectly responsible for the death of a 78-year-old man who fell while trying to remove a satellite dish from the roof of his home.
- September 17–18 – The wave to Tropical Storm Helene passed to the south of Puerto Rico on September 17 and 18. Across the southern and eastern portion of the island, the system produced 6 to 12 in (150 to 300 mm) of rainfall, which resulted in flash flooding and mudslides. One house was destroyed and more than 100 houses were affected in Ponce, forcing several families to evacuate. The flooding also destroyed a bridge in Guayama and made many roads impassable. Damage on the island was estimated at $100,000 (2000 USD).

== 2001 ==
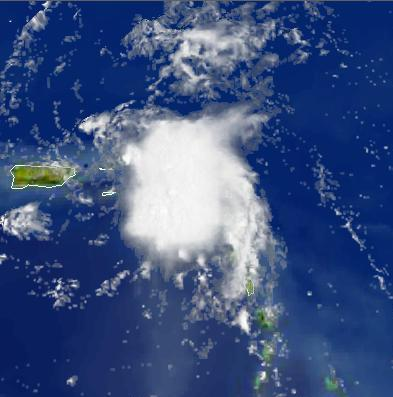
Tropical Storm Dean shortly after formation on August 22

- August 18 - the outer rainbands of Tropical Storm Chantal produced light to moderate rainfall across Puerto Rico and the United States Virgin Islands. In Puerto Rico, the highest rainfall total was 2.4 inches (61 mm) in Rio Piedras.
- August 22–23 – Tropical Storm Dean dropped heavy rainfall across Puerto Rico, peaking at 12.7 inches (322 mm) in Salinas. The passage of Dean resulted in widespread flooding in eastern and southern Puerto Rico, collapsing two bridges and one road. Several highways were under water, and one car was swept away by the floodwaters. The four inside the vehicle were later rescued and unharmed. Throughout the island, about 1,320 houses were flooded, and two houses experienced collapsed roofs. The rains left various towns without power or water. Two people were injured in Peñuelas, and three were injured in Nagüabo when the ceiling of a day care center collapsed, though no deaths occurred on the island. One airline canceled seventeen flights in and out of the island, and one cruise line was required to alter its path to both Dean and earlier due to Tropical Storm Chantal. Damage in Puerto Rico totaled to $7.7 million (2001 USD, $9.4 million 2008 USD), of which $2.1 million (2001 USD, $2.6 million 2008 USD) was from agricultural damage.

== 2003 ==
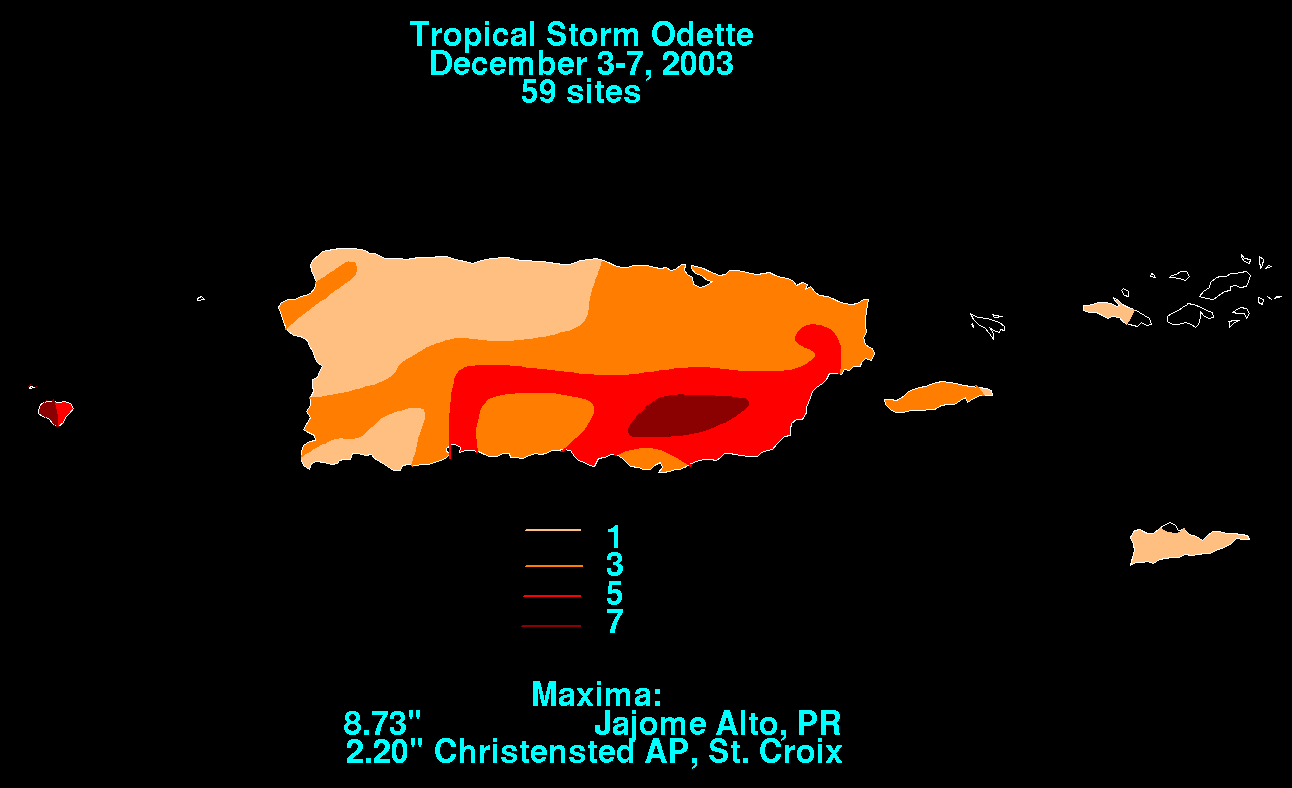
Rainfall totals from Tropical Storm Odette

- August 18 - Tropical Depression Nine caused moderate rainfall in Puerto Rico, where 2 to 3 inches (50 to 75 mm) of precipitation were recorded. Damage in Puerto Rico totaled $20,000 (2003 USD$, 35,004 2026 USD).
- October 10–11 - Tropical Storm Mindy caused rainfall levels that reached up to 7.13 inches (181 mm) near Ponce, Puerto Rico. Strong winds left around 29,000 people without power in northeastern Puerto Rico. The rainfall wrecked bridges in Las Piedras and Guayama, and led to flooded streams, downed trees, and rockslides that closed four roads. One car was swept away, and a few houses were flooded. The damage total was at least $46,000 (2003 USD).
- December 8–10 - Tropical Storm Odette caused moderate rainfall across Puerto Rico. Rainfall in Puerto Rico was heaviest in the southeast, where a peak of 8.73 in (221.74 mm) was recorded in Jajome Alto. Odette's rainfall caused flooding throughout Puerto Rico's rivers. The river flooding destroyed three bridges, resulting in $20,000 in damages (2003 USD).

== 2004 ==
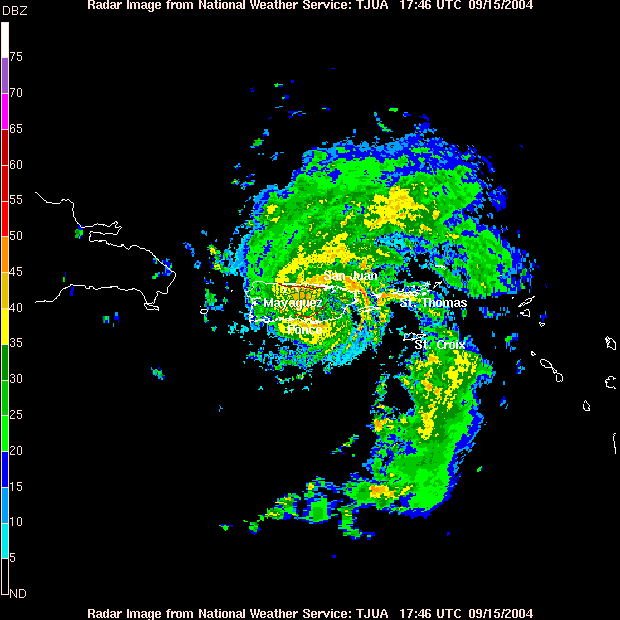
Radar image of Tropical Storm Jeanne striking Puerto Rico

- September 15–16 - Upon striking Puerto Rico, Tropical Storm Jeanne produced tropical storm force winds in portions of the island. A NWS employee reported sustained winds of 63 mph (101 km/h), with gusts to 71 mph (114 km/h) in Salinas along the southern coast. In Cayey, located in the center of the island, a 72 mph (117 km/h) gust was reported, just shy of hurricane force. Additionally, the Luis Muñoz Marín International Airport in San Juan reported sustained winds of 49 mph (80 km/h). In Yabucoa, the winds killed one woman after she was flung into a wall. A total of 8 were killed, and damage totaled $169.5 million (2004 USD), making it the most damaging tropical cyclone since Hurricane Georges in 1998.

== 2006 ==
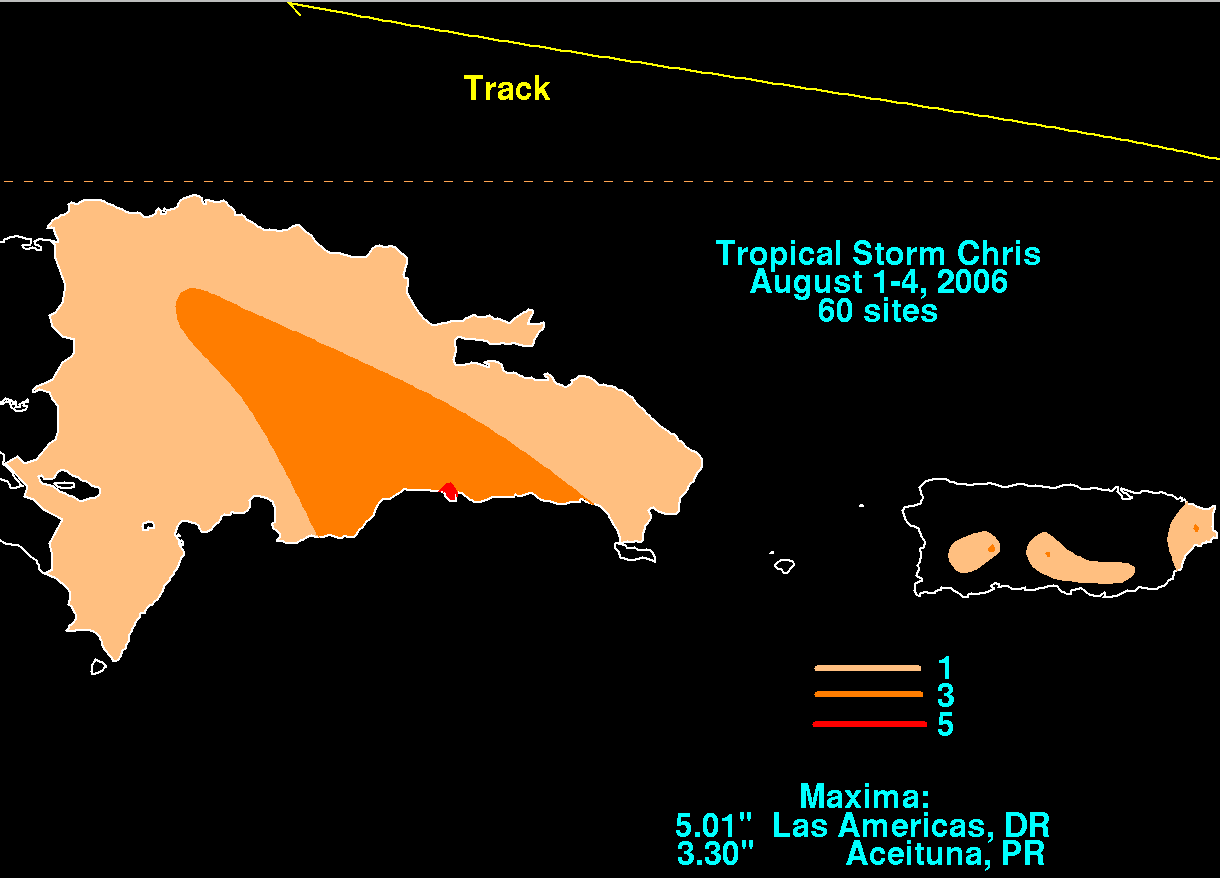
Rainfall totals from Tropical Storm Chris in Puerto Rico and the Dominican Republic

- August 3 - Tropical Storm Chris dropped light rainfall in Puerto Rico, peaking at 3.09 inches (78 mm) in Fajardo. The rainfall from the storm caused the Fajardo River to overflow its banks, which temporarily closed a highway in the northeastern portion of the island.

== 2007 ==
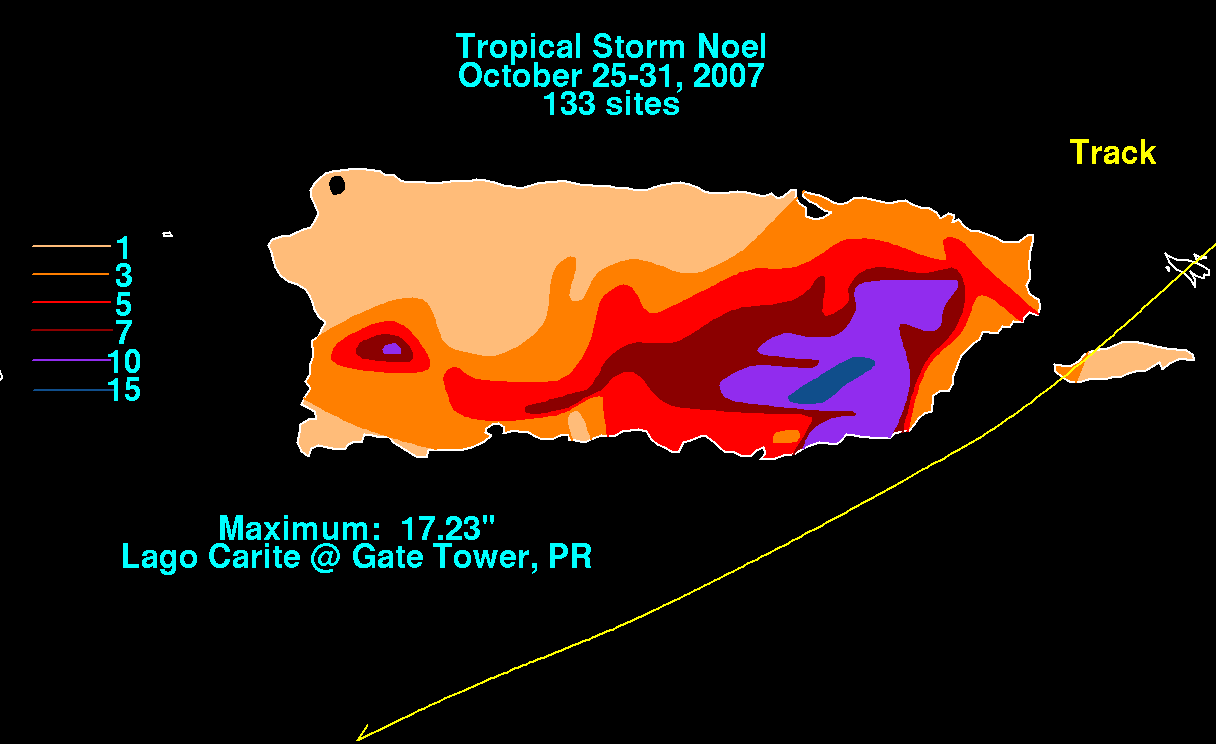
Rainfall summary for precursor system of Hurricane Noel in Puerto Rico

- October 26 - The precursor of Hurricane Noel dropped heavy rainfall across Puerto Rico for several days, leaving grounds saturated and causing surface runoff. Precipitation peaked at 17.23 inches (438 mm) at Carite Lake. Flash flooding was reported in Carolina, and a mudslide occurred in Utuado. Flooding occurred along several rivers, including the Río de la Plata, with a reading of 8.9 feet (2.7 m) above flood stage at Toa Baja reported late on October 27. In response to high water levels, officials opened dam gates along the Río de la Plata and the Río Carraízo. There were no official reports of fatalities.
- December 11–12 - Tropical Storm Olga dropped light to moderate precipitation across Puerto Rico, peaking at 11.13 inches (283 mm) near Ponce. The rainfall increased levels along several rivers across the island, including the Río Grande de Arecibo which was reported at several feet above flood stage. Its passage left about 79,000 people without power and 144,000 without water. In the northern portion of the island, the rainfall caused a mudslides that buried an automobile, which killed its driver.

== 2008 ==
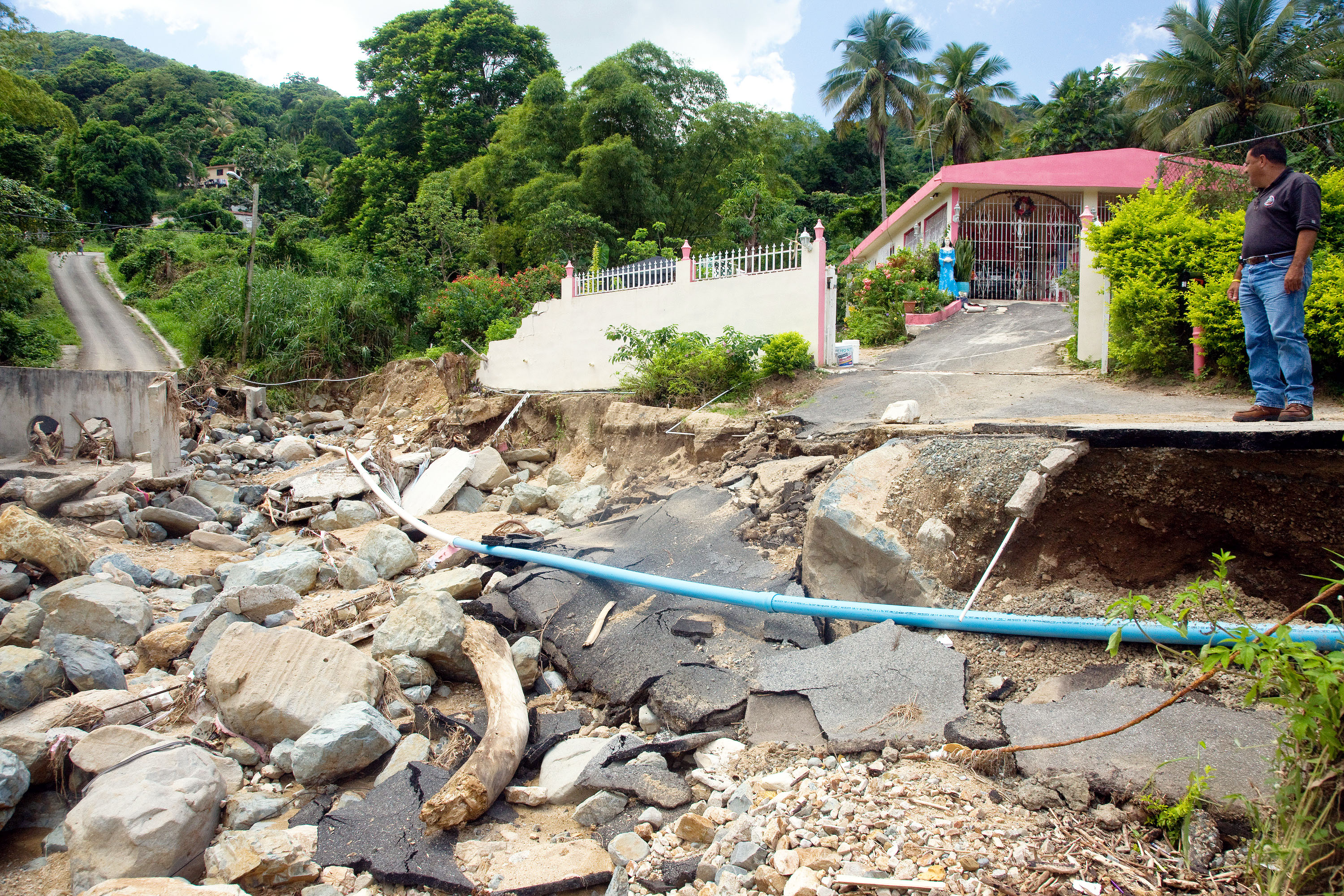
Road damage in the Palo Seco area from Hurricane Kyle

- August 30–31 - Some areas of northeastern Puerto Rico observed 10–12 inches (250–300 mm) of rain in only 24 hours due to Tropical Storm Hanna. As a result, many rivers exceeded their banks and several mudslides were reported. A number of streets were inundated and later closed. The Westin Rio Mar Golf Club course in Río Grande was also flooded. On the western side of the island in Añasco, residents fled their homes for shelters.
- September 21–23 - The precursor to Hurricane Kyle produced record-breaking rains over Puerto Rico from September 21 to 23. With isolated maxima in excess of 30 inches (760 mm), rivers breached their flood walls and flooded low-lying areas. Damage to agriculture on the island was estimated to be $23 million and structural damage was estimated at $25 million, for a total of $48 million.
- October 13–16 - The precedent to Hurricane Omar produced heavy rains over the island, causing minor flooding. After passing by Puerto Rico a second time, Omar produced locally heavy rains, which caused minor street flooding. A man died after he collapsed from cardiac arrest while trying to install storm shutters on his home.

== 2009 ==
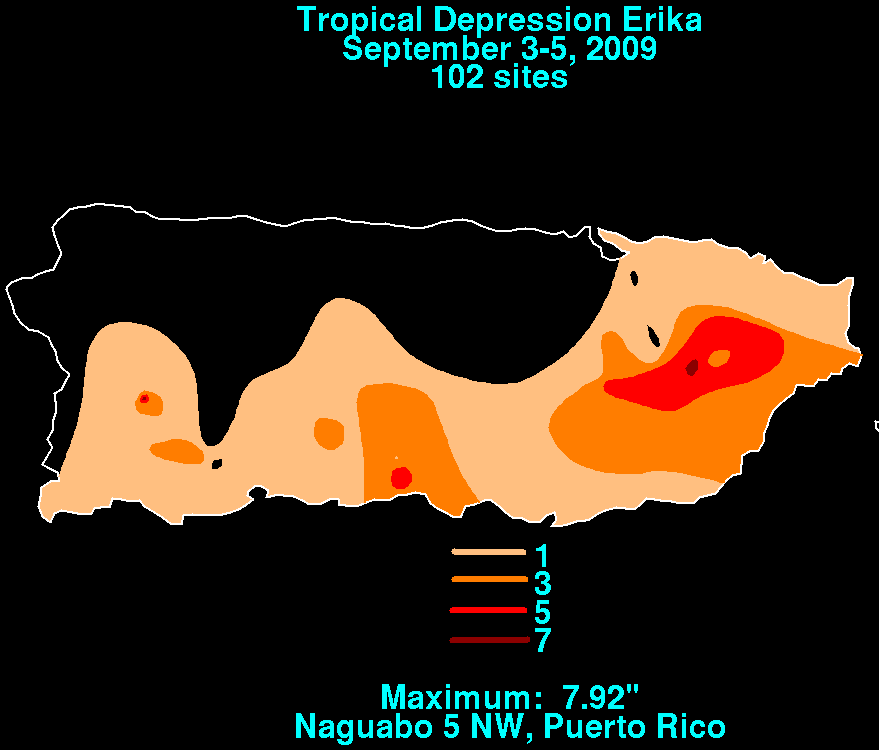
Rainfall summary for remnants of Tropical Storm Erika in Puerto Rico

- August 17 - Minor rainfall from Tropical Storm Ana triggering minor flooding but little damage. A maximum of 2.76 in (70 mm) of rain fell in Río Grande. The rains caused the Río Fajardo to rise, resulting in the issuance of an alert as officials warned it could overflow its banks. Several streets were temporarily shut down due to flooding, including one tunnel, and three schools had to be evacuated. Throughout the island, roughly 6,000 people were left without power as numerous branches were snapped off trees and knocked down power lines.
- August 22 - Large, life-threatening swells produced by Hurricane Bill impacted north-facing coastlines of Puerto Rico
- September 4 - The remnants of Tropical Storm Erika produced significant amounts of rainfall, causing the rivers of La Plata, Loíza and Caguitas to overflow their banks and trigger widespread flooding. A weather station in Naguabo recorded 7.92 in (201 mm) of precipitation. Several other areas recorded upwards of 4 in (100 mm). In the municipality of Guanica, several homes were flooded, leaving $5,000 in damage. The most severe damage took place in the municipality of Las Piedras where $15,000 was reported in flood losses. One river rose to a level of 29.27 ft (8.92 m), 7.27 ft (2.22 m) above flood stage. Damage in Fajardo was estimated at $10,000 after homes were inundated by flood waters. Additionally, flooding in Caguas resulted in $5,000 in damage.

== 2010 ==
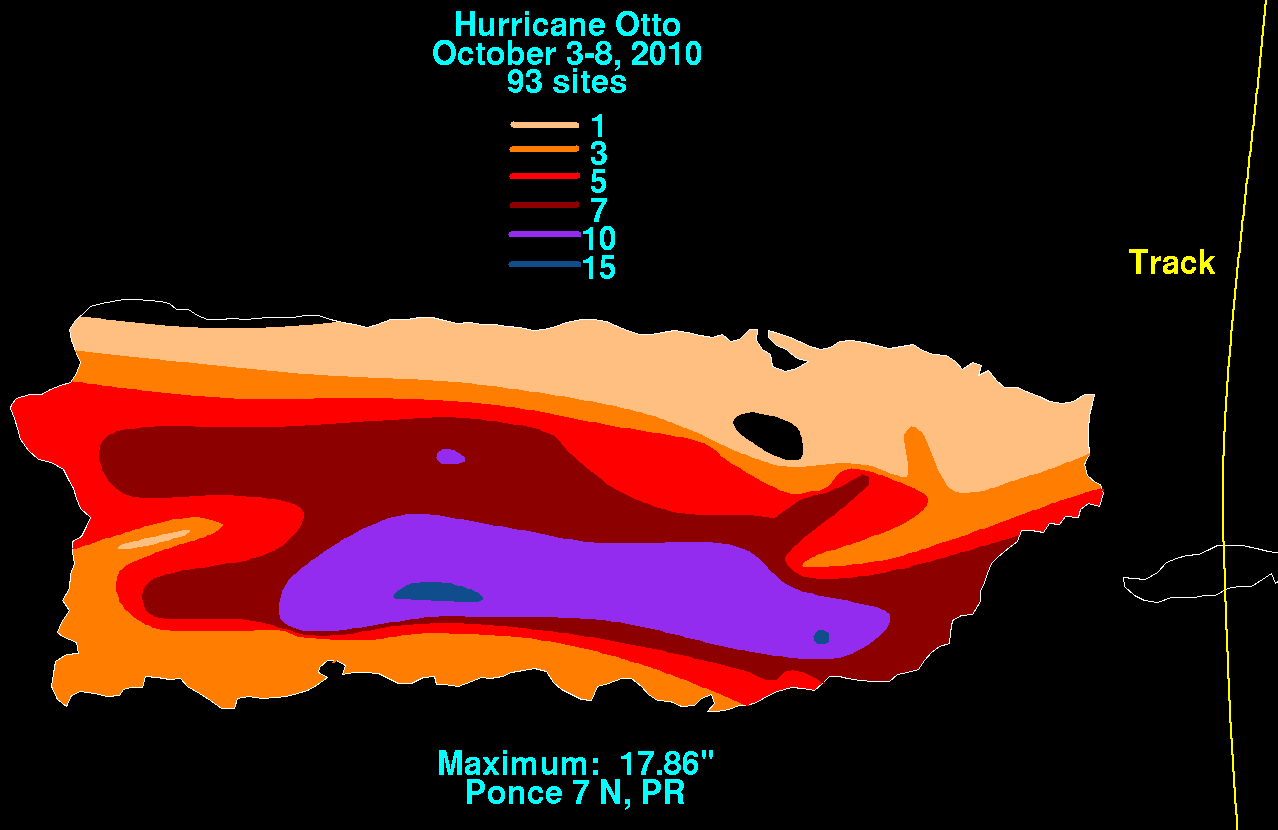
Storm total rainfall related to Hurricane Otto in Puerto Rico

- July - The precursor to Tropical Storm Bonnie brought significant rainfall to parts of Puerto Rico and Hispaniola, leading to widespread flooding. In Puerto Rico, one person drowned after being caught in a swollen river.
- August 30–31 - Heavy rains from Hurricane Earl began to affect Puerto Rico as Hurricane Earl moved closer to the island. Throughout the island, a maximum of 5.19 in (132 mm) of rain fell near Naguabo. In San Juan, 3.57 inches (91 mm) of rain fell during the passage of Earl. Dozens of roads were shut down across the island due to flooding and downed power lines. At the height of the storm, roughly 187,000 residences were left without power and 60,000 more were without water.
- September 7–8 - The remnants of Tropical Storm Gaston produced sporadic rainfall across Puerto Rico, peaking at 3.03 in (76.9 mm) in Naguabo.
- September 16–21 - Hurricane Igor large swells averaging 9 to 13 ft (2.7 to 4.0 m) in height. Similar conditions affected Puerto Rico where another person drowned. On several occasions, Luquillo was flooded by the surf, though no damage took place.
- October 5–8 Rain began to pour across several parts of Puerto Rico due to Hurricane Otto, persisting for up to five days in some areas. The greatest amount of rainfall during the six-day period of October 3 to 8 was registered at Rio Portugues in Ponce, with 17.86 inches (454 mm) recorded. Subsequent widespread flooding affected at least 295 roads, 14 of which suffered significant damage. In all, damage to road infrastructure was preliminarily estimated at US$6.5 million. In addition, the municipality of Ponce reported copious losses in agriculture, later estimated at US$1.5 million.

== 2011 ==
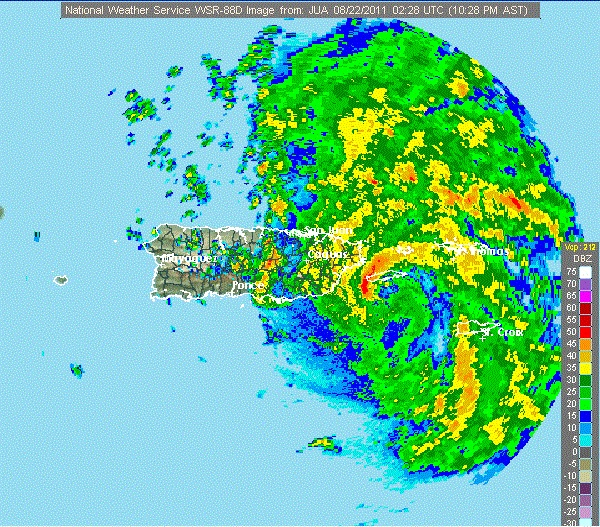
Last radar image of Hurricane Irene from San Juan, before the radar went out

- August 2–3 While moving south of Puerto Rico, Tropical Storm Emily brought prolonged tropical storm conditions to many parts of the island. The heaviest rainfall occurred in southern regions; Caguas recorded a total of 8.22 in (209 mm) of rain during the storm. High winds damaged an electrical grid, cutting off power to about 18,500 customers. Throughout the island, multiple roads were made impassable by landslides and fallen objects; infrastructural damage surmounted $5 million, according to preliminary estimates. Capital losses were estimated at $55 million.
- August 21–23 - Across Puerto Rico, heavy rains from Hurricane Irene caused extensive damage to roads while hurricane-force winds toppled many trees and utility poles, which led more than 1 million residences without power. At higher elevations, winds estimated by radar neared 111 mph (179 km/h). The highest amounts of precipitation fell across eastern parts of the territory; in Gurabo, a peak total of 22.04 in (560 mm) was recorded. The rains continued to fall for hours into the wake of the storm. One driver was killed after their vehicle was caught in swollen currents. Preliminary estimates indicate structural damage could be as high as $500 million (USD), with additional losses due to the three-day labor suspensions pinned at over $60.4 million (USD).
- September 11–12 - Hurricane Maria effects on the island of Puerto Rico were primarily in the form of heavy rainfall. Flood waters near Patillas, Puerto Rico, destroyed several homes and bridges, causing $1.3 million (2011 USD) in damage. In the surrounding city of Yabucoa, Puerto Rico, heavy rainfall flooded and damaged around 150 homes. Many people were forced to relocate after rainfall and mud filled their homes. Near the city of Naguabo, Puerto Rico, the car of a 60-year-old woman was swept away by flood waters on a road. After becoming tangled in bushes, the woman was able to get out of her car and pulled to safety.

== 2012 ==
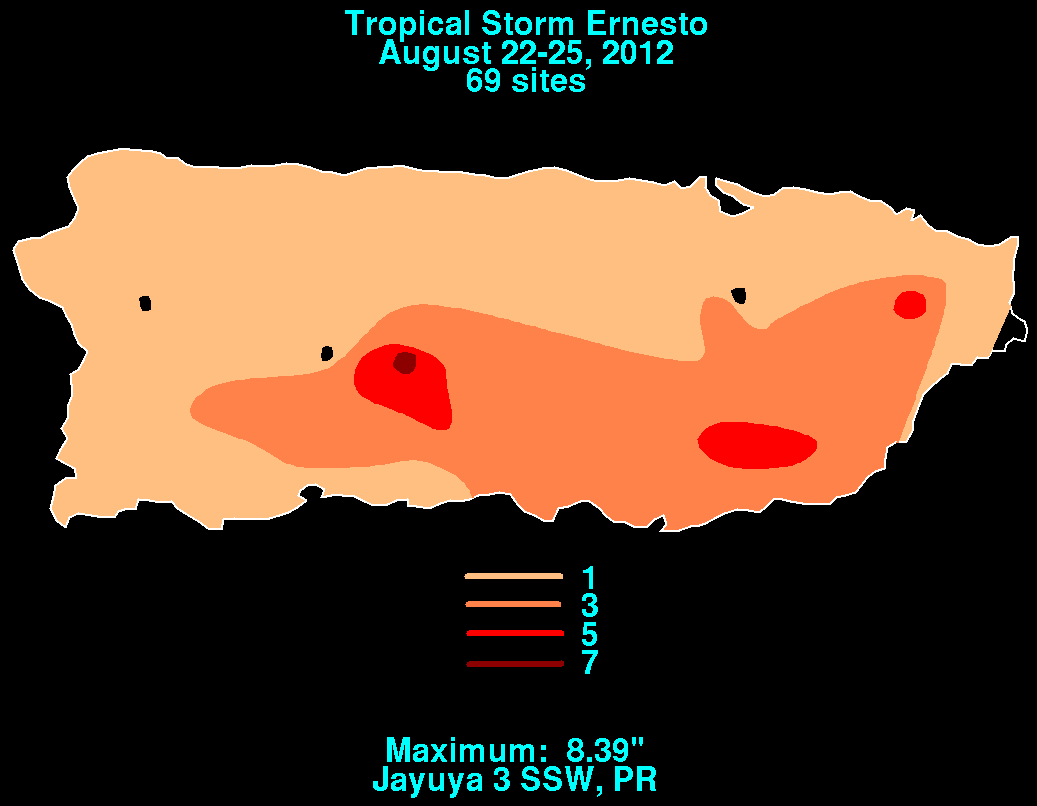
Rainfall totals from Tropical Storm Ernesto in Puerto Rico

- August 4 - In Puerto Rico, some areas experienced locally heavy rainfall due to Tropical Storm Ernesto, especially the southern half of the island. The heaviest amount of precipitation observed was 8.39 in (213 mm) near Jayuya. A few mudslides occurred and some streets flooded, leaving at least three cars stranded.

== 2013 ==
Tropical Storm Chantal shortly before peak intensity

- July 9 - Although sustained winds in Puerto Rico remained below tropical storm force, a weather station at Las Mareas in Guayama observed a wind gust of 51 mph (82 km/h) late on July 9 due to Tropical Storm Chantal. Winds toppled trees and power lines, blocking several roads.
- September 5–7 - During a 48-hour period, the disturbance to Tropical Storm Gabrielle brought 6 to 8 in (150 to 200 mm) of rain to some areas of Puerto Rico. A mudslide detached part of a small bridge on Highway 184.

== 2014 ==
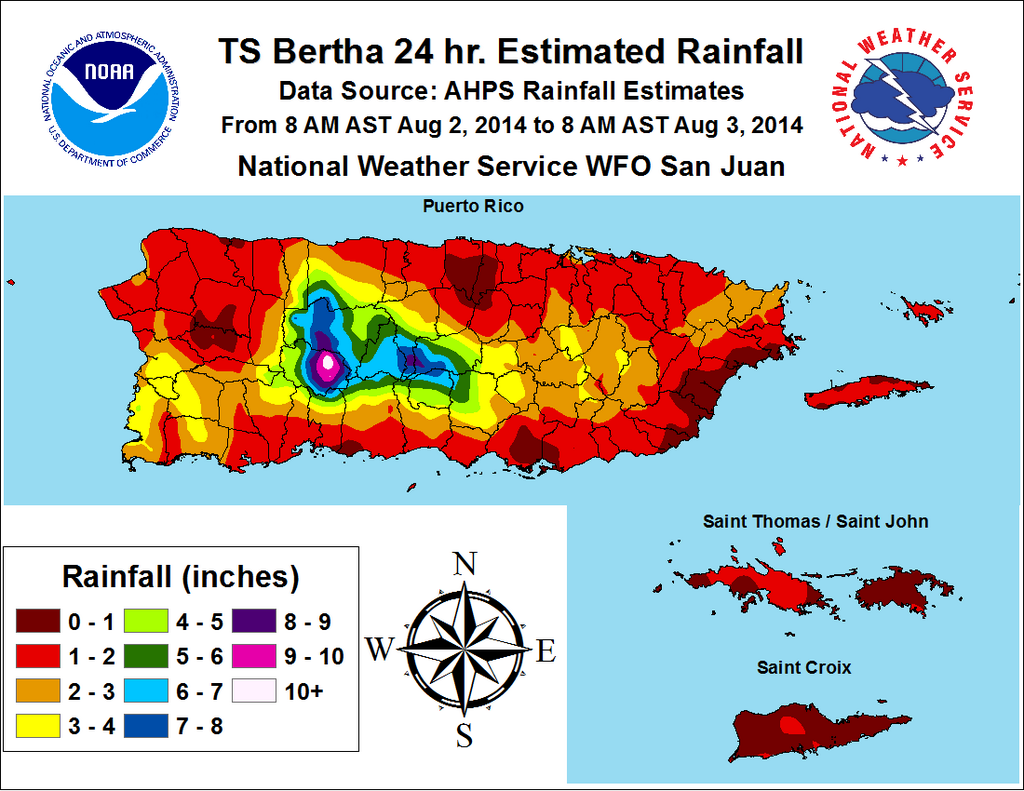
Map of rainfall estimates across Puerto Rico and the U.S. Virgin Islands from Tropical Storm Bertha in early August 2014.

- August 2–3 - Across Puerto Rico, the outer bands of Tropical Storm Bertha dropped a general 3 to 5 in (76 to 127 mm) of rain, with isolated areas reaching 10 in (250 mm), over areas suffering from a drought. Accumulations peaked at 11.11 in (282 mm) in Adjuntas. Landslides blocked a few roads around Aceitunas. Tropical storm-force wind gusts, peaking at 52 mph (84 km/h), downed some trees and power lines. Prolific lightning accompanied the storm and resulted in 29,000 residences losing power.
- August 22–24 - As Hurricane Cristobal's parent wave moved over Puerto Rico, it engaged with an abnormally moist air mass to produce torrential rains totaling more than 10 in (250 mm). The highest rainfall totals were enhanced by orographic lift over mountainous terrain. A rain gauge near Tibes recorded a peak total of 13.21 in (336 mm), the majority of which fell on August 24. Luis Muñoz Marín International Airport near San Juan reported 5.52 in (140 mm) of precipitation. The floods cut electricity to nearly 17,000 customers and left 7,000 without clean drinking water after putting some 18 filtration plants out of service.
- October 14–15 - Hurricane Gonzalo produced squally weather in parts of Puerto Rico, causing power outages and prompting 20 people to stay in an emergency shelter.

== 2015 ==
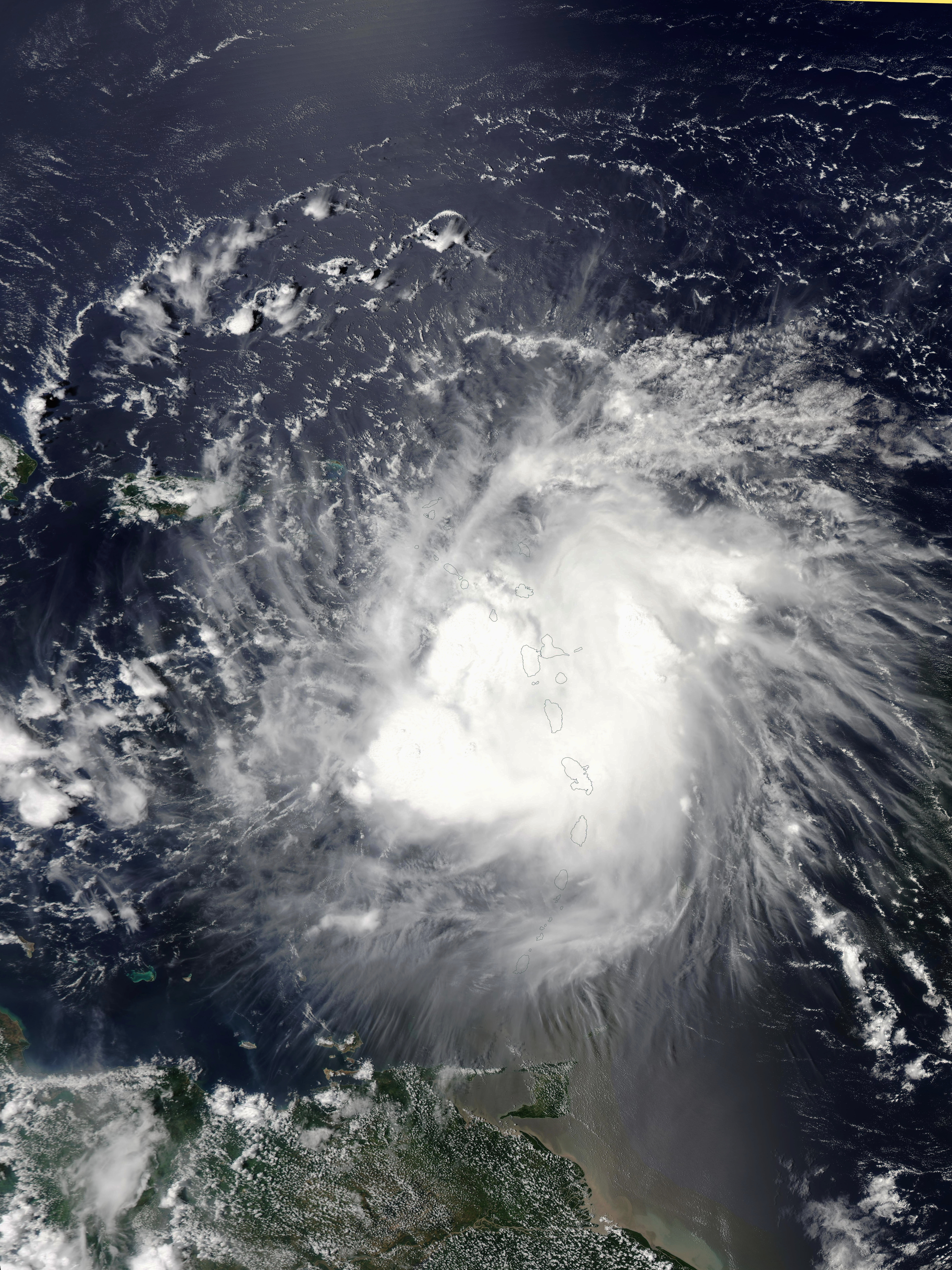
Tropical Storm Erika over the Leeward Islands on August 27

- August 28 - The outer bands of Tropical Storm Erika brought much-needed rain to drought-stricken Puerto Rico; a station in Adjuntas recorded 4.45 in (113 mm) of rain. Tropical storm-force wind gusts, peaking at 59 mph (95 km/h) in Maricao, caused substantial disruption to the power grid, leaving approximately 250,000 people without electricity. Thirty-six homes sustained roof damage across interior locations of the territory and agriculture sustained US$17.37 million in damage.

== 2017 ==
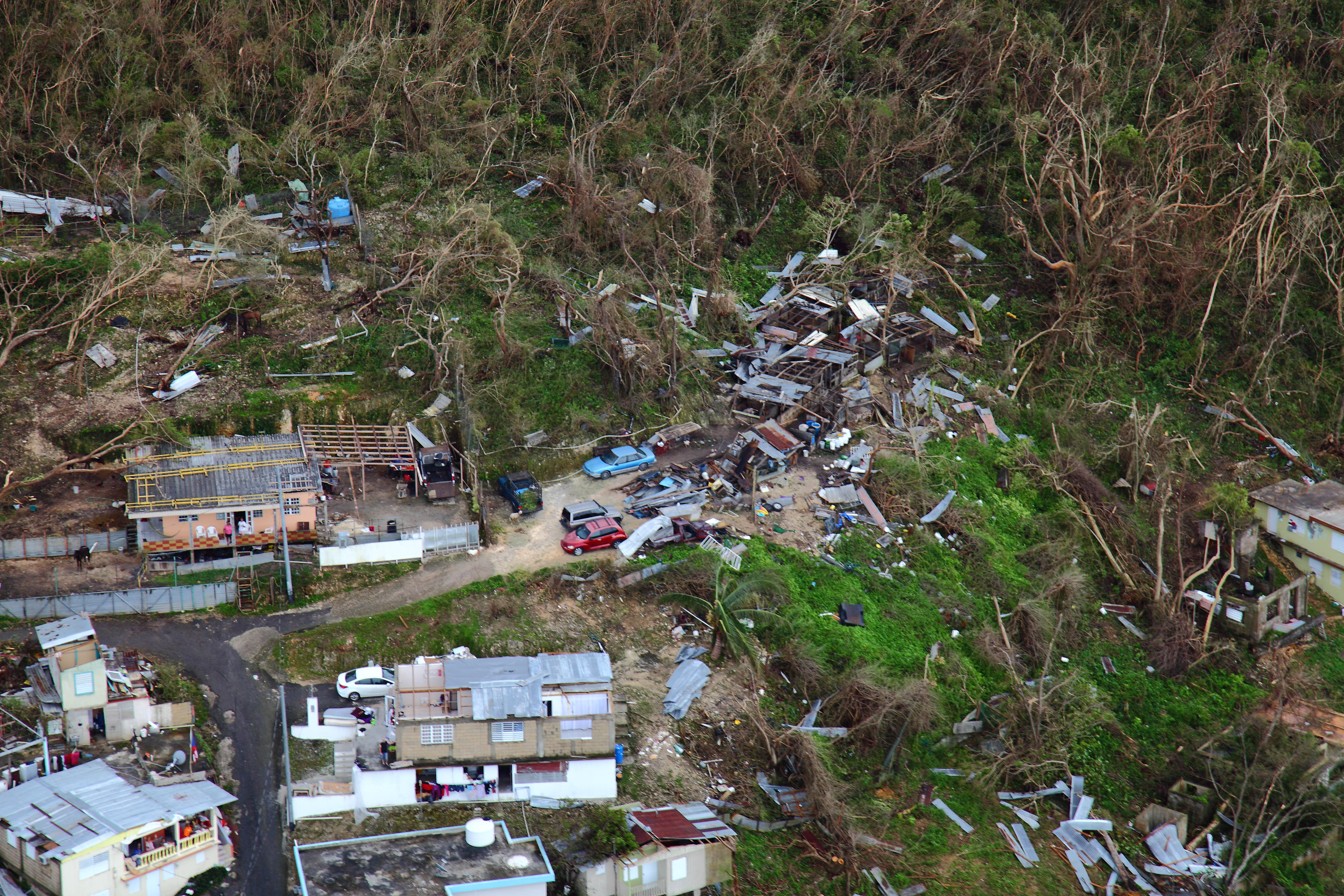
Thousands of homes suffered varying degrees of damage while large swaths of vegetation were shredded by Hurricane Maria's violent winds

- September 6–7 - Hurricane Irma passed north of Puerto Rico, but still caused significant damage to the United States territory. Much of the main island experienced sustained tropical storm force winds, with a peak sustained wind speed of 55 mph (89 km/h) at a weather station along San Juan Bay. Portions of Puerto Rico received heavy rainfall, with a peak total of 13.04 in (331 mm) in Bayamón. On Culebra, the island suffered an almost complete loss of electrical and water services. Hurricane Irma was attributed to around $1 billion in damage, and the NHC attributed three fatalities to Irma in Puerto Rico, though four deaths were related to the storm.
- September 20–21 - Hurricane Maria made landfall near Yabucoa, Puerto Rico, causing catastrophic damage. The island's electric grid was devastated, leaving all 3.4 million residents without power. The hurricane caused about $90 billion in damage in Puerto Rico and the USVI. An estimated 2,975 people in total died in Puerto Rico as a result of Hurricane Maria, in the six months after the hurricane

== 2018 ==
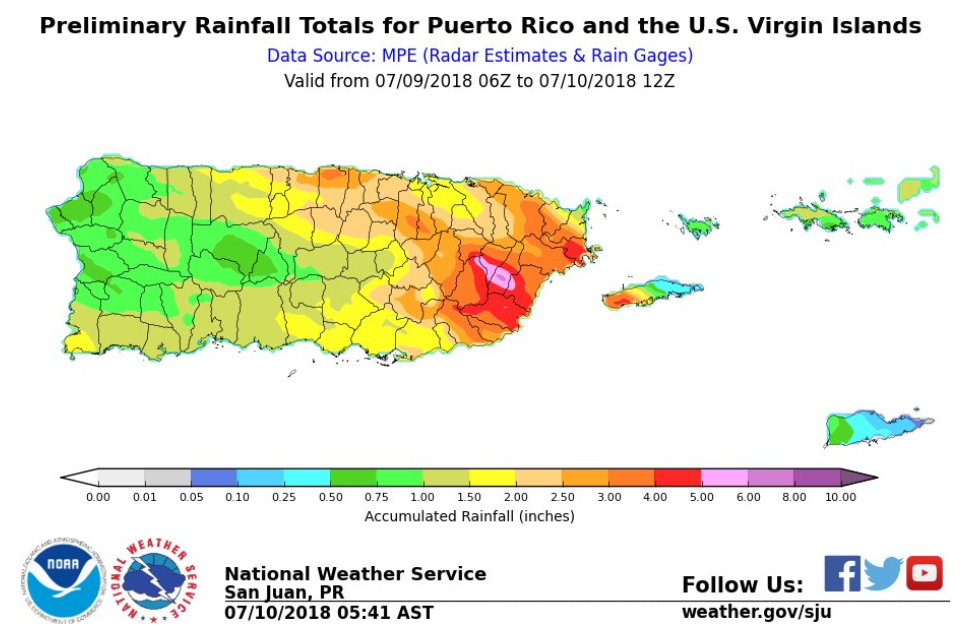
Preliminary rainfall totals for Puerto Rico and the U.S. Virgin Islands from Hurricane Beryl

- July 9–10 - Over 8 inches of rain fell in Puerto Rico from Hurricane Beryl. The enhanced rainfall also triggered flash flooding. A landslide was reported in the town of Naranjito. Vehicles were trapped on Puerto Rico Highway 909 near Humacao after the road was inundated by floodwaters. By the time the storm passed, approximately 47,000 Puerto Ricans lost power on the island.

== 2019 ==
Radar loop of Tropical Storm Karen moving over the islands of Vieques and Culebra.

- August 28–29 - Hurricane Dorian moved farther northeast than initially anticipated, resulting in very limited effects in Puerto Rico. A man in Bayamón died when he fell off his roof trying to clean drains in advance of the storm.
- September 24–25 - Tropical Storm Karen dropped a peak precipitation amount of 5 inches (130 mm) in Coamo, where a bridge was swept away, isolating 15 families. Numerous roads across the island were flooded and became impassible due to mudslides and runoff. River floods were reported in Utuado, Jayuya and Yabucoa municipalities with a mudslide also occurring in Jayuya municipality. The Culebrinas River overtopped its banks, causing flooding in Aguadilla. Roughly 29,000 customers lost electricity in Puerto Rico. A mudslide blocked part of Puerto Rico Highway 14 in Aibonito. In Toa Baja, two people were trapped in a house by flooding.

== 2020 ==
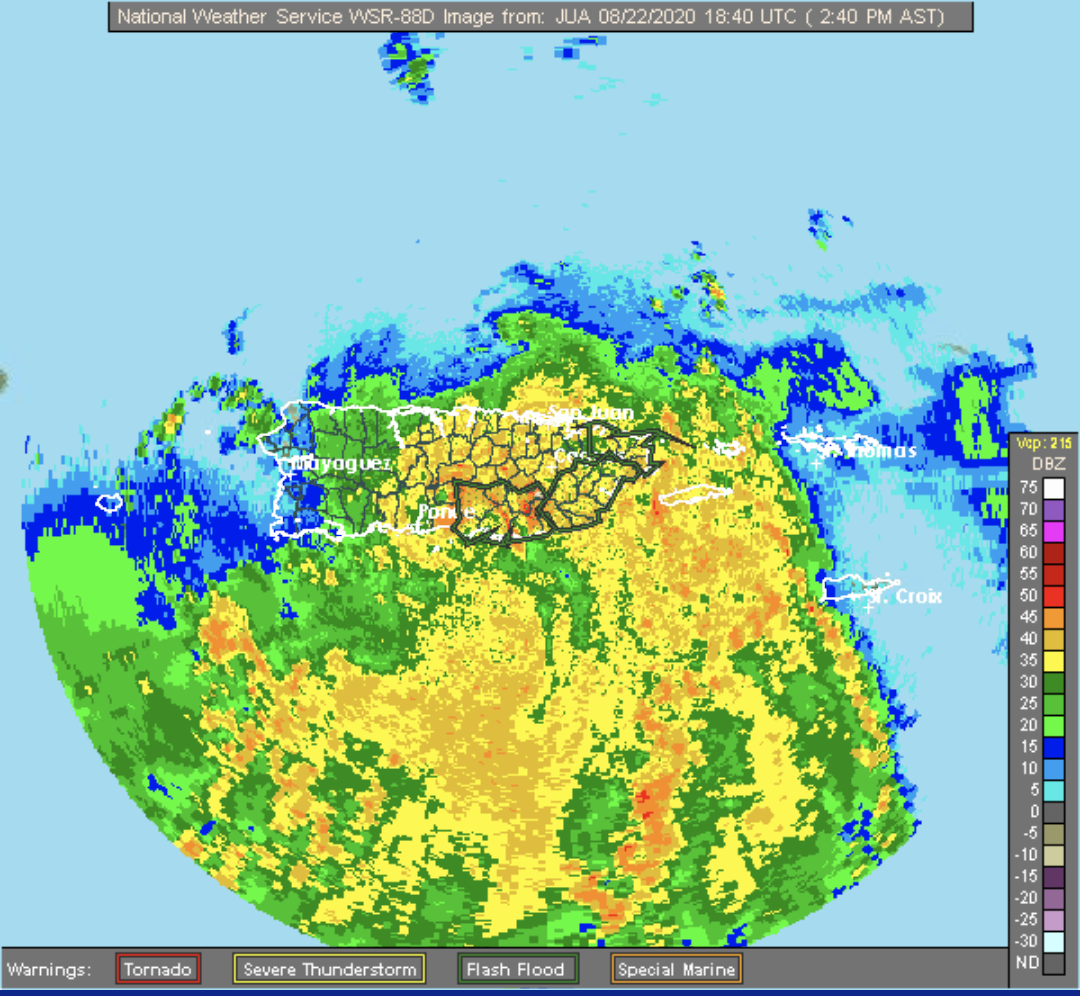
Radar image showing Tropical Storm Laura passing south of Puerto Rico on August 22

- July 30–31 - In Puerto Rico, Hurricane Isaias caused about 448,000 people and 23 hospitals to lose power and about 150,000 people lost water service due to electric blackouts and blocked intakes. In Jayuya, a town in the center of Puerto Rico experienced substantial effects including the loss of its 1.5 million dollar hot air balloon, an important tourist attraction. Due to the extensive damage, President Donald Trump approved an emergency declaration request from Puerto Rico's governor Wanda Vázquez Garced.
- August 22–23 - In Puerto Rico, Tropical Storm Laura downed trees and caused flooding in Salinas. Part of the Salinas city sign was also blown over during the storm. A peak of 4.09 in (104 mm) of precipitation was reported in Villalba, with a peak wind gust of 75 miles per hour (120 km/h) being reported in Salinas. Roughly 200,000 customers lost power in Puerto Rico, with nearly 14,000 losing access to running water.
- September 18 (indirect) - A man and a woman drowned in the waters off La Pocita Beach in Loíza, Puerto Rico due to the rip currents and churning waves that Hurricane Teddy had caused in the north of the Lesser and Greater Antilles.

== 2021 ==
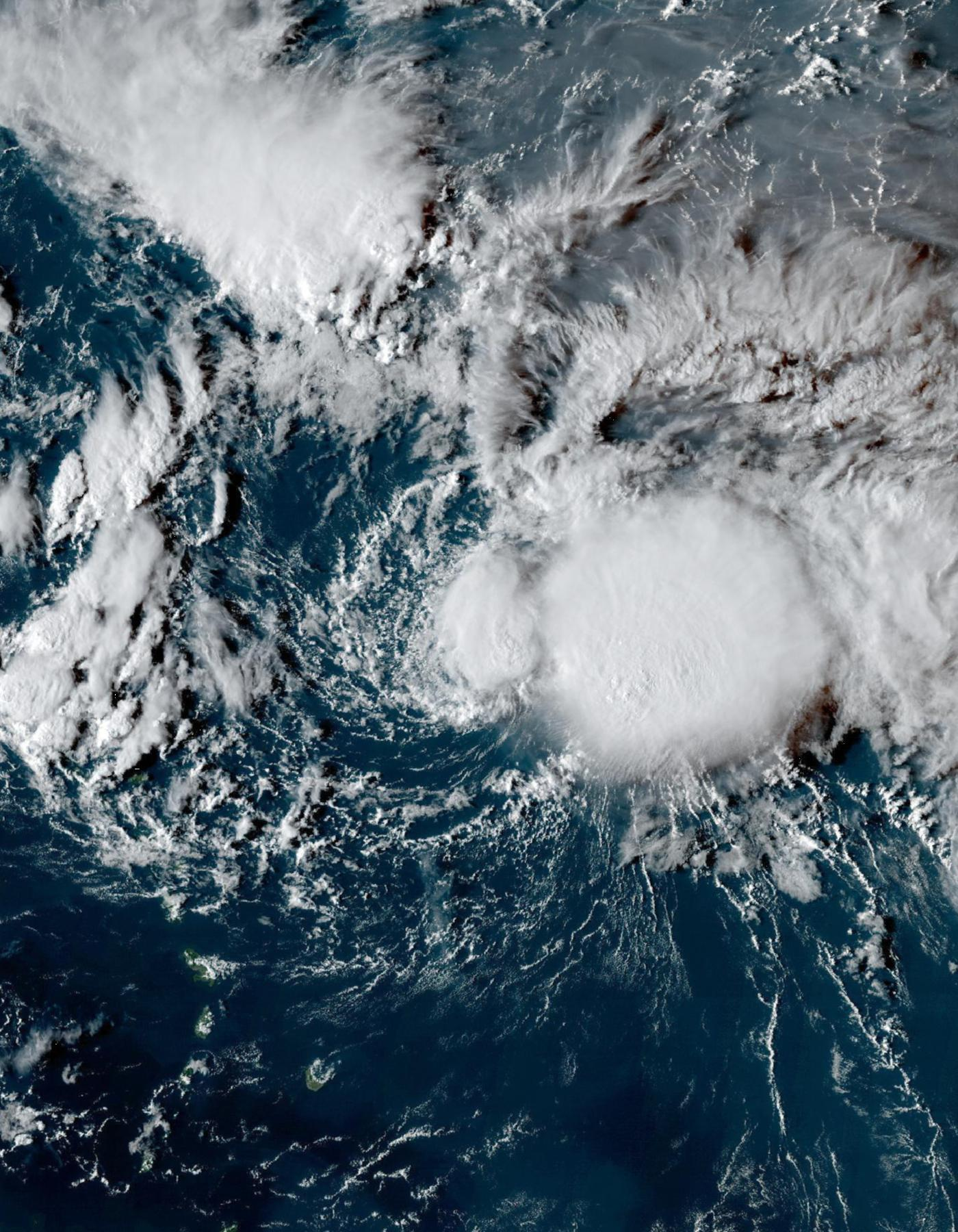
Satellite image of Tropical Storm Peter on September 22.

- August 11 - Tropical Storm Fred caused a 55 km/h (34 mph) wind gust in Lajas.
- September (indirectly) - Rough surf and rip currents generated by Hurricane Larry's large wind field led to a drowning in Puerto Rico.
- September 21 - Tropical Storm Peter brought heavy rain showers to Puerto Rico, as it tracked to its north. In the country, the towns of Lares and Morovis both observed up to 3.76 in (96 mm) of precipitation, although parts of the former may have experienced rainfall totals up to 5 to 6 in (130 to 150 mm). This caused a few mudslides and minor flooding in some areas, including in Carolina, Corozal, Utuado, and Vega Baja. Damage on Puerto Rico totaled about $12,000.

== 2022 ==
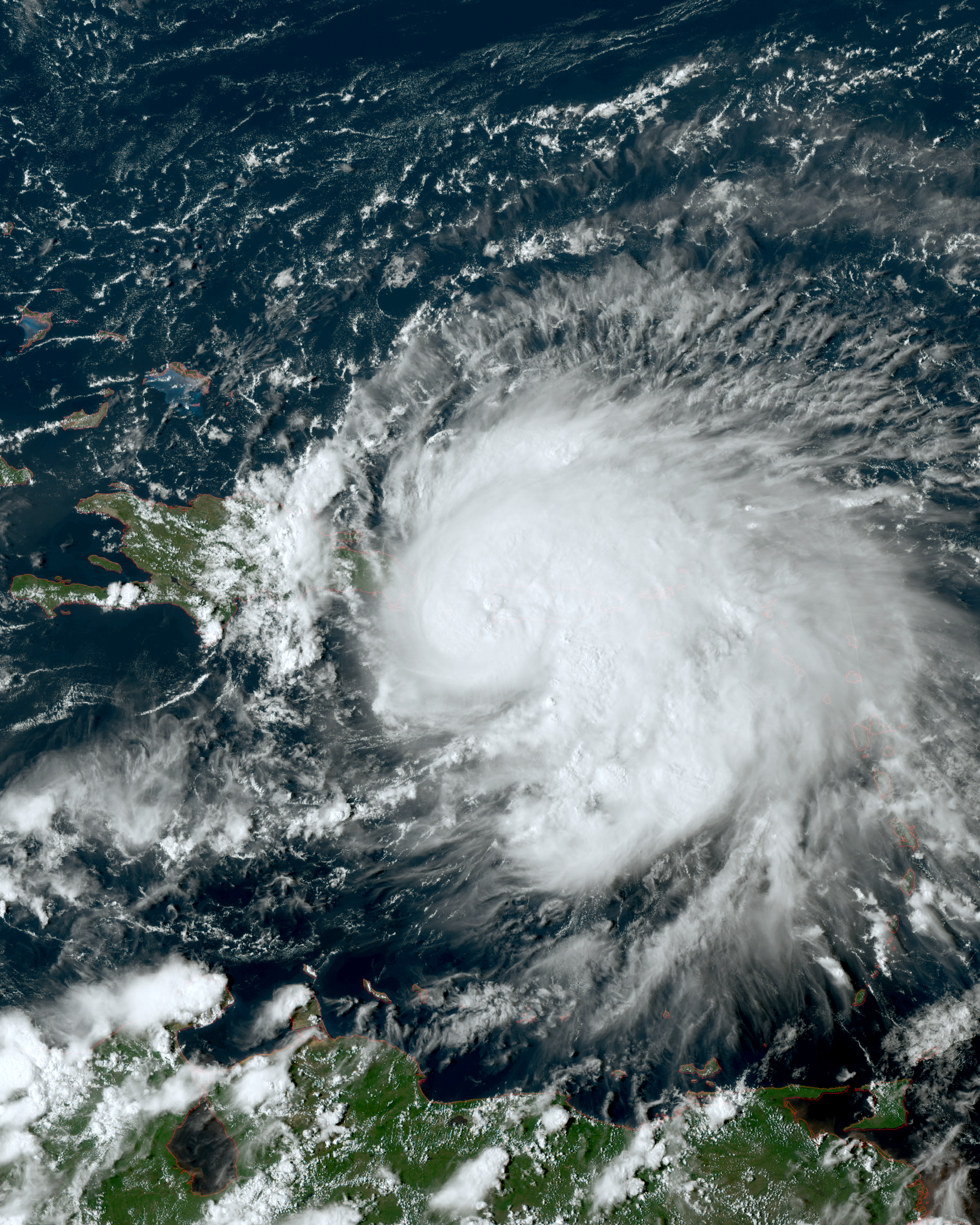
Hurricane Fiona making landfall in Puerto Rico on September 18

- September 4–5 - The outerbands of Hurricane Earl produced rainfall amounts generally ranging from 3 to 5 in (76 to 127 mm) in eastern Puerto Rico, while a weather station near Finca La Loma recorded a peak total of 7.7 in (200 mm) of precipitation. Two people died near Salinas after being struck by lightning while riding a jet ski.
- September 18–19 - Hurricane Fiona caused a power outage in the entirety of Puerto Rico. The winds from the storm covered the entire island bringing heavy rainfall. Roads were stripped of pavement due to Fiona's torrential rainfall, roofs were torn off houses, and at least one bridge was completely washed away. A gauge near Ponce measured 31.34 inches (796.0 mm) inches of rain, Many landslides were recorded throughout the island. Many crops were destroyed
- November 4–6 - Torrential rains of 4–8 in (100–200 mm) fell on Puerto Rico due to Hurricane Nicole.

== 2023 ==
- August 22–24 - Tropical Storm Franklin affected Puerto Rico.

== Monthly statistics ==
Month	Number of Puerto Rico tropical cyclones
July	4
August	18
September	17
October	5
November	1
December	2

== See also ==
- List of Puerto Rico hurricanes
- List of Florida hurricanes (2000–present)
- List of United States hurricanes
