= Typhoon Sarika =

Pacific typhoon in 2016

Typhoon Sarika (Karen)
- Typhoon Sarika approaching the Philippines on October 15

Meteorological history
- Formed: October 13, 2016
- Dissipated: October 19, 2016

Very strong typhoon
- 10-minute sustained (JMA)
- Highest winds: 175 km/h (110 mph)
- Lowest pressure: 935 hPa (mbar); 27.61 inHg

Category 4-equivalent typhoon
- 1-minute sustained (SSHWS/JTWC)
- Highest winds: 215 km/h (130 mph)
- Lowest pressure: 944 hPa (mbar); 27.88 inHg

Overall effects
- Fatalities: ≥ 1
- Damage: $894 million (2016 USD)
- Areas affected: Philippines, South China, Vietnam
- IBTrACS
- Part of the 2016 Pacific typhoon season

Typhoon Sarika, known in the Philippines as Typhoon Karen, was a powerful tropical cyclone which affected the Philippines, South China, and Vietnam in mid-October 2016. The twenty-first named storm and the tenth typhoon of the annual Pacific typhoon season, Sarika developed from a tropical disturbance east of the Philippines on October 13. The system steadily strengthened as it traveled westwards, becoming a tropical storm later that day and then a typhoon on October 15. Rapid intensification commenced as Sarika turned to the west-northwest towards Luzon, reaching its peak intensity just before making landfall in Aurora early on October 16. Sarika weakened significantly as it crossed land, emerging over the South China Sea as a minimal typhoon, then weakening further to a severe tropical storm on October 17. Sarika maintained its strength for the rest of the day and made landfall in Hainan province in China on October 18. Turning to the northwest, Sarika weakened quickly as it emerged into the Gulf of Tonkin, before moving onshore once again in Guangxi province on October 19. The system dissipated shortly after.

Sarika produced significant impacts in the Philippines as a strong typhoon. Strong winds and flooding rainfall caused landslides, power outages, and disruptions of telecommunications services. Nearly 13,000 homes were damaged or destroyed, and more than 200,000 people were displaced. Agricultural damage in the Philippines was severe, totaling ₱3.63 billion (US$76.4 million). (Note: All currencies are in their 2016 values and are converted to United States dollars using data from the International Monetary Fund published by the World Bank.) Damage to infrastructure was valued at ₱226 million (US$4.76 million). No fatalities occurred, though several mountaineers and sailors were rescued. While not as strong at subsequent landfalls in China, Sarika combined with the northeast monsoon to produce heavy rains across South China and northeast Vietnam. Hong Kong saw its October hourly rainfall record broken by thunderstorms from Sarika on October 19. A person went missing after a boat capsized near Wang Chau Island. Gusty winds and torrential rains affected Hainan, Guangxi, and Guangdong. In particular, Sarika was the strongest October typhoon to hit Hainan since 1971, where nearly 6,000 houses were damaged, 130,000 people lost access to telecommunications services, and almost 381,000 hectares (940,000 acres) of banana, cassava, papaya, and rubber crops were impacted. Direct economic losses in the province reached ¥4.56 billion (US$686 million). Another 165,000 hectares (410,000 acres) of crops were damaged in Guangxi and Guangdong. In total, Sarika killed at least one person and caused economic losses reaching US$894 million.

== Meteorological history ==
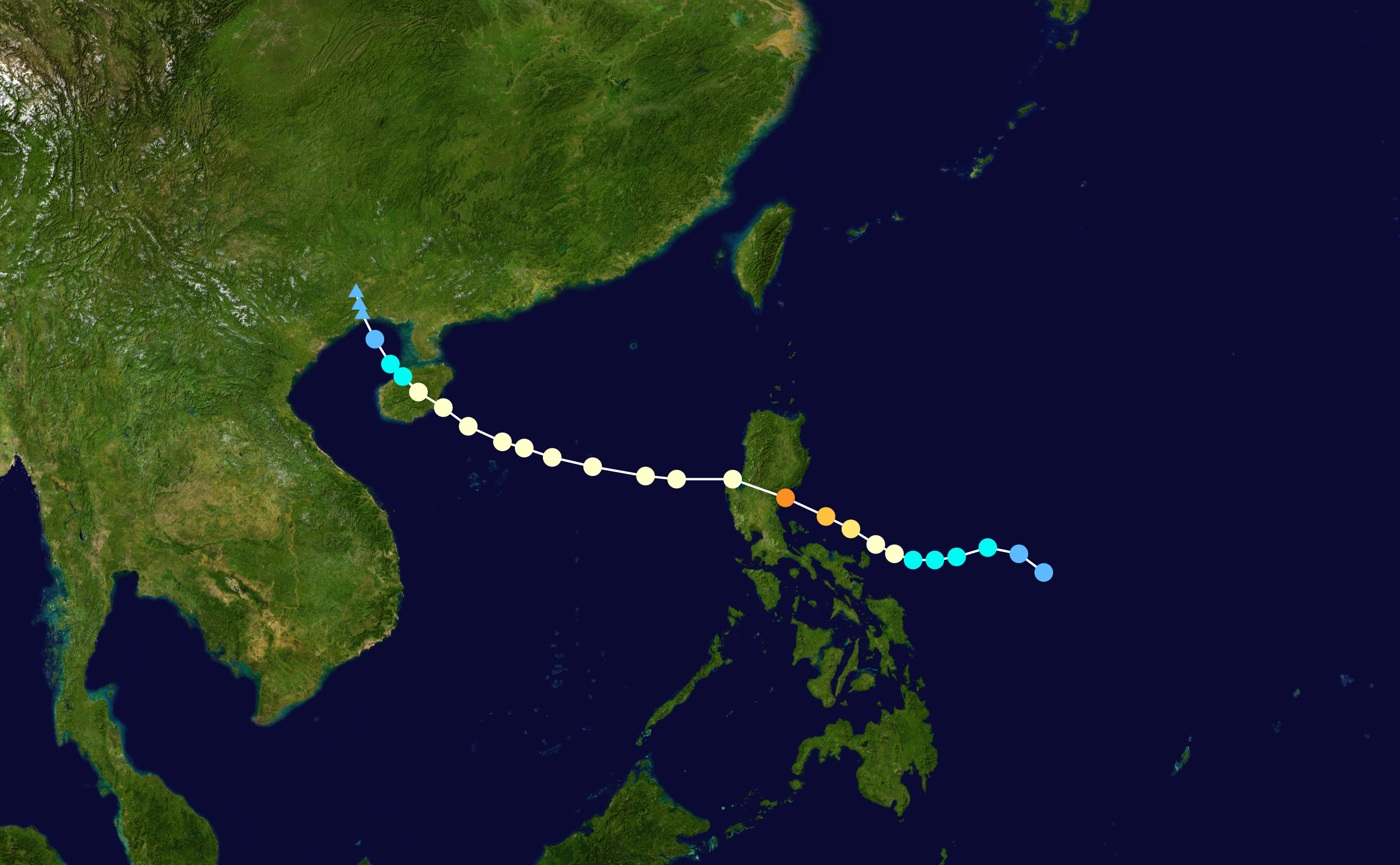
Map plotting the storm's track and intensity, according to the Saffir–Simpson scale Map key Saffir–Simpson scale Tropical depression (≤38 mph, ≤62 km/h) Tropical storm (39–73 mph, 63–118 km/h) Category 1 (74–95 mph, 119–153 km/h) Category 2 (96–110 mph, 154–177 km/h) Category 3 (111–129 mph, 178–208 km/h) Category 4 (130–156 mph, 209–251 km/h) Category 5 (≥157 mph, ≥252 km/h) Unknown Storm type Tropical cyclone Subtropical cyclone Extratropical cyclone, remnant low, tropical disturbance, or monsoon depression

Sarika was first noted by the United States-based Joint Typhoon Warning Center (JTWC) as a disorganized tropical disturbance on October 11, while it was about 1,050 km (650 mi) southeast of Manila. The system quickly consolidated within a favorable environment of low wind shear and high sea surface temperatures of about 30 °C (86 °F), leading the JTWC to issue a Tropical Cyclone Formation Alert. By 00:00 UTC on October 13, the system's low-level circulation center became increasingly symmetric as it tracked northwestwards and the Japan Meteorological Agency (JMA) upgraded the disturbance to a tropical depression. (Note: The Japan Meteorological Agency is the official Regional Specialized Meteorological Center for the western Pacific Ocean.) The JTWC followed suit six hours later. Intensification slowed thereafter as an upper-level anticyclone suppressed outflow on the eastern side of the system. However, the system managed to intensify into a tropical storm by 18:00 UTC on October 13 as it traveled west-northwestwards along a subtropical ridge. At this point, the system was given the name Sarika by the JMA. (Note: The name Sarika (Khmer: សារិកា, [saːriʔkaː]) was contributed by Cambodia and refers to the common hill myna (Gracula religiosa) in Khmer.) The Philippine Atmospheric, Geophysical and Astronomical Services Administration (PAGASA), which had been tracking the storm since October 12, assigned it the local name Karen.

On October 14, the anticyclone that had been hampering outflow diminished, allowing the system to once again quickly gain organization. The system intensified into a severe tropical storm at 12:00 UTC, and then a typhoon at 00:00 UTC the next day. As Sarika traversed warm seas with surface temperatures reaching 31 °C (88 °F), the system developed a small, well-defined eye that was apparent on both infrared and microwave satellite imagery, signalling the onset of rapid intensification. Sarika reached peak intensity as a very strong typhoon at 18:00 UTC on October 15, assessed by the JMA to have sustained winds of 175 km/h (109 mph) and a minimum pressure of 935 hPa (27.61 inHg). (Note: Wind estimates from the JMA and most other basins throughout the world are sustained over 10 minutes, while estimates from the JTWC are sustained over 1 minute. On average, 1-minute winds are about 12% higher than 10-minute winds.) The JTWC simultaneously assessed Sarika to have winds of 215 km/h (134 mph), equivalent to Category 4 status on the Saffir–Simpson scale. Just half an hour later, Sarika made its first landfall near Baler, Aurora in the Philippines. Significant weakening occurred in the six hours that Sarika traversed Luzon as the mountainous terrain disrupted its circulation, with the JMA and JTWC estimating that winds fell to 140 km/h (87 mph). The system recovered a ragged eye as it continued west-northwest under the influence the subtropical ridge, and exited the Philippine Area of Responsibility on October 16.

Despite continued favorable conditions, Sarika struggled to reintensify as its eye remained ragged, with the JMA assessing that it weakened further to a severe tropical storm at 00:00 UTC on October 17. The JTWC, however, maintained that the system remained a typhoon as it crossed the South China Sea. The broad system turned northwest late on October 17 as it began to round the subtropical ridge. At 01:50 UTC on October 18, Sarika made landfall on Hainan Island near Hele, Wanning with winds of 110 km/h (68 mph) according to the JMA. Bringing wind gusts of 162 km/h (101 mph) to the island, Sarika became the strongest October typhoon to impact Hainan since 1971. The system weakened quickly into a tropical storm as it moved across Hainan, before emerging into the Gulf of Tonkin at 16:00 UTC. Sarika's convective structure continued to fall apart, and the system weakened into a tropical depression prior to its final landfall near Fangchenggang, Guangxi at 06:10 UTC on October 19. Sarika dissipated inland over Guangxi before 00:00 UTC on October 20.

== Preparations ==
=== Philippines ===
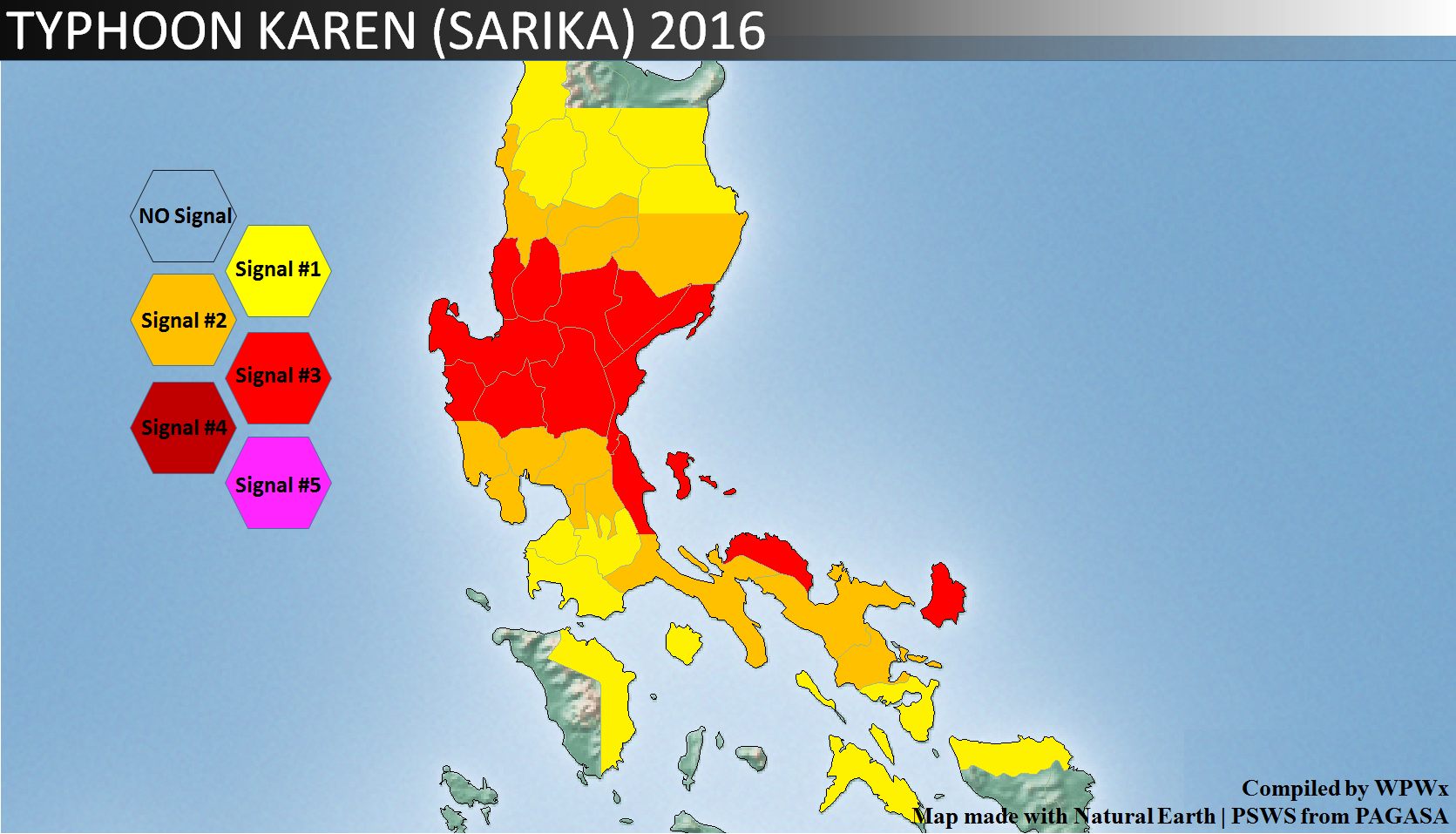
Highest Public Storm Warning Signals raised by PAGASA across the Philippines in relation to Typhoon Karen (Sarika)

In anticipation of the typhoon, PAGASA issued Public Storm Warnings for a number of areas. In particular, signal number 3 – indicating an expectation of winds of 121–170 km/h (75–106 mph) within the next 18 hours – was issued for the provinces of Pangasinan, Zambales, Tarlac, Nueva Ecija, Aurora, Quezon, La Union, Benguet, Nueva Vizcaya, Quirino, Catanduanes, and Camarines Norte. A total of 39,934 people across the Ilocos, Cagayan Valley, Central Luzon, Calabarzon, and Bicol administrative regions were evacuated. Schools were closed in all of these regions, as well as the National Capital Region and the Cordillera Administrative Region, from October 16 to 18. Flights arriving and departing between October 15 and 18 were cancelled because of the adverse weather conditions, with 259 domestic flights and 62 international flights affected. Ports in Luzon and the Visayas were closed, stranding up to 4,000 passengers.

The National Disaster Risk Reduction and Management Council (NDRRMC) was placed on red alert on October 15, requiring all associated agencies to be fully staffed and prepared. The Department of Social Welfare and Development set aside ₱1.28 billion (US$27.0 million) worth of standby funds, including 494,222 family food packs worth ₱745 million (US$15.7 million), for immediate disaster relief. The 7th Infantry Division of the Philippine Army was placed on standby for disaster operations. The Department of Health stockpiled ₱22.2 million (US$467,000) worth of medicine and other logistics for emergency use.

=== China ===
The Hong Kong Observatory (HKO) issued Standby Signal No. 1 at 13:20 UTC on October 16, as winds began to shift with the approach of Sarika. This was raised to Strong Wind Signal No. 3 at 05:40 UTC on October 17, when Sarika was 550 km (340 mi) south-southwest of Hong Kong. Classes for kindergartens and schools for disabled children were cancelled, although children daycare centers, elderly centers, and rehabilitation centers remained open. Bunker operations at the Port of Hong Kong were suspended for the duration of the strong wind signal. On October 18, as Sarika moved away from Hong Kong, the HKO replaced the tropical cyclone warnings with a Strong Monsoon Signal. However, as heavy rains continued to impact Hong Kong, the HKO issued a Black Rainstorm Warning on the afternoon of October 19, the first time they had done so in October since the Rainfall Warning System came into place in 1992.

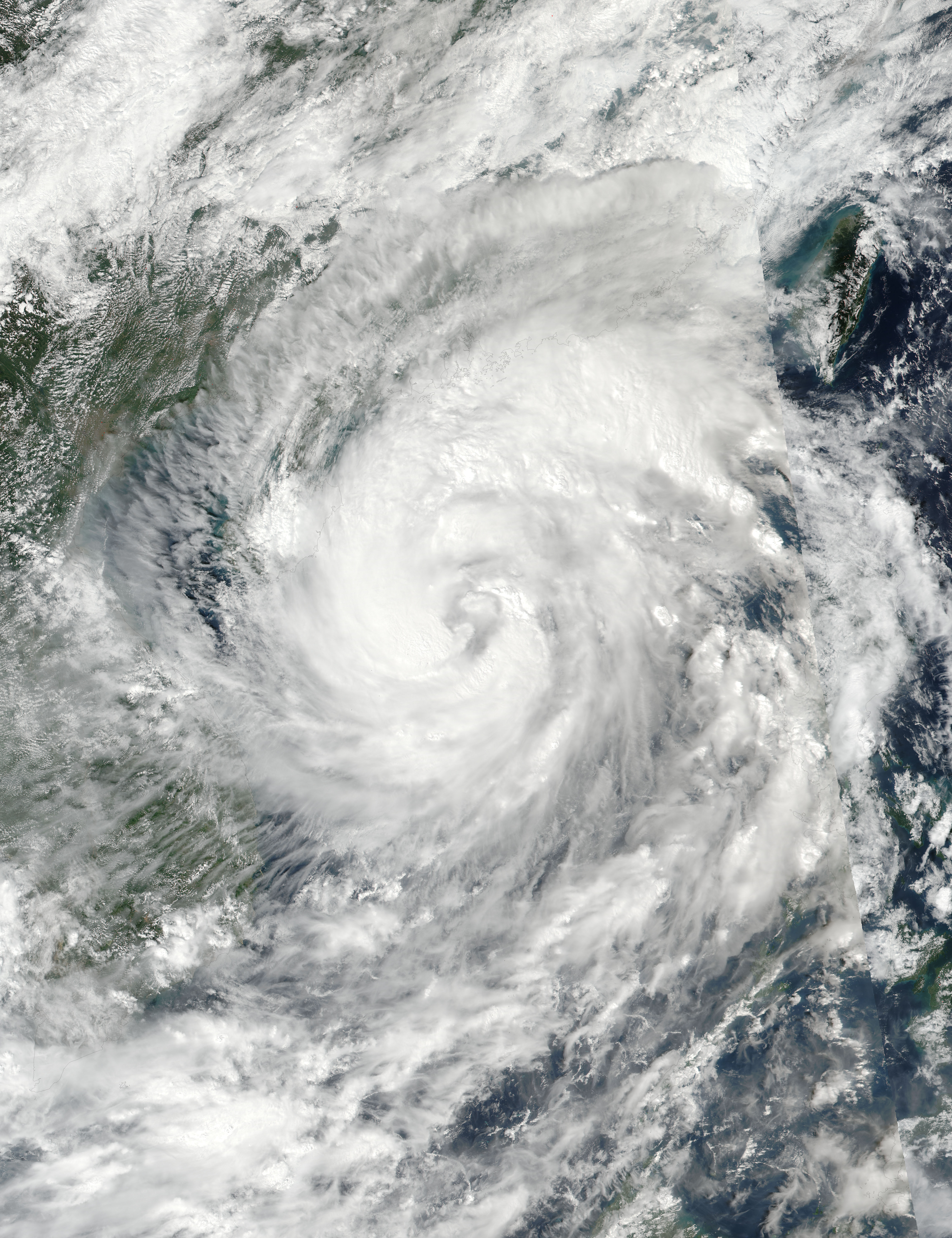
Typhoon Sarika approaching Hainan on October 17

As Sarika approached South China, the State Flood Control and Drought Relief Headquarters activated a Level I emergency response, and sent six teams to Hainan, Guangdong, Guizhou, Yunnan, and Guangxi to prepare for disaster relief. Around 660,000 people were evacuated from Hainan, including 13,700 from low-lying areas in Wanning. High-speed train services were suspended from October 17. Haikou Meilan International Airport suspended operations from October 17 to 18 and cancelled 281 flights, while 248 flights were cancelled at Sanya Phoenix International Airport. Schools in eight counties in Hainan were closed for three days. Tourist sites were also shut to the public. Workplaces, businesses, and schools were shut in the coastal city of Sanya. On October 17, the National Marine Environmental Forecasting Center issued a red alert – the highest category on China's severe weather warning system – for ocean waves, and an orange alert – the second highest category – for stormy weather. A total of 25,396 fishing boats were recalled to various ports in Hainan.

In Guangdong, authorities enacted a Level II emergency response, with storm surge expected to be enhanced by a concurrent high tide. Authorities evacuated 55,800 people in dangerous areas. Ships were forbidden from passing through the Qiongzhou Strait after 21:00 UTC October 16, and were instead diverted to Zhanjiang. A total of 14,181 ships returned to port in Guangdong.

In Guangxi, authorities activated a Level III emergency response. A yellow alert was issued on October 19, ahead of heavy rainfall. 57,300 residents were moved to safety and schools were closed. Ferry services from Beihai to Hainan and Weizhou Island were halted. About 1,000 tourists on Weizhou Island, as well as residents of low-lying areas in the northern half of the island, were evacuated to the mainland. The Nanning–Guangzhou high-speed railway ceased ticket sales for trips on October 19. A total of 7,259 fishing boats were recalled to the Port of Beihai, resulting in 22,522 occupants seeking shelter. In all, 12,044 ships sought shelter across Guangxi. Twelve flights were cancelled at Beihai Fucheng Airport. The Guangxi Maritime Safety Administration readied several tugboats in case of emergencies. Further inland, yellow alerts were issued for Guizhou on October 19 in anticipation of heavy rainfall and flash flooding.

=== Vietnam ===
As Sarika approached, officials instructed district governments to evacuate people at risk of floods, fearing that earlier severe flooding in central Vietnam could be worsened by the system. A total of 770 ships in Hạ Long Bay were called back to shore. The People's Army of Vietnam prepared 280,000 soldiers and 3,200 vehicles to conduct search and rescue operations. Schools in Quảng Ninh were closed on October 19, and many businesses in Hạ Long were shut. Vietnam Airlines cancelled all flights in and out of Cat Bi International Airport on October 19. Farmers in Hải Phòng rushed to harvest 23,000 hectares (57,000 acres) of rice fields before the typhoon's rainbands arrived.

== Impact ==
=== Philippines ===
Over its course through the Philippines, Typhoon Sarika, known locally as Typhoon Karen, directly affected a total of 329,468 people in 1,491 barangays across six regions, and displaced 207,832 people. Rainfall accumulations during October 14 to 15 peaked at nearly 560 mm (22 in) at Virac, Catanduanes; Daet, Camarines Norte recorded a similar total above 530 mm (21 in). Power interruptions occurred in several regions; 246,000 people in Catanduanes were left without power at the height of the storm. Communication towers belonging to PLDT were downed in Agoo, La Union. Smart Communications experienced partial loss of its services in Aurora, while Globe Telecom experienced significant loss of service across Southern Luzon. Water supplies were disrupted in Tagkawayan, Quezon, as well as parts of Pamplona, Camarines Sur. Across the Philippines, roads were blocked in 48 places and 23 bridges were rendered impassable by floods, landslides, and rockslides. Floods occurred in 122 barangays in the provinces of Panganiban, Bulacan, Pampanga, Nueva Ecija, and Bataan. The Bustos, Ambuklao, and Magat dams opened their floodgates as their water levels neared or overshot the normal high water level. A total of 12,777 homes were damaged, of which 1,421 were completely destroyed. Damage to infrastructure totaled ₱226 million (US$4.76 million).

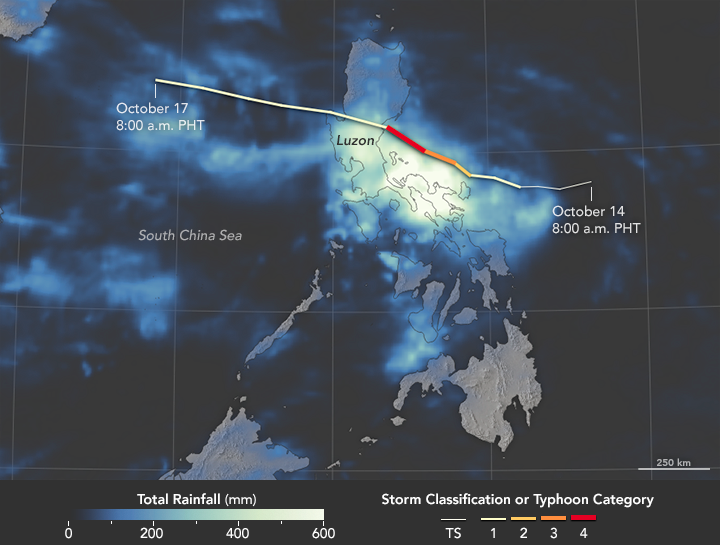
Satellite estimate of rainfall totals over the Philippines from October 14 to 17

The adverse weather conditions necessitated several land and sea rescues. In the waters off Catbalogan, Samar, strong winds and large waves capsized a service vessel carrying eleven people on October 14, and partially sank another boat carrying five people on October 15. Everyone on board the two vessels was brought to safety. A group of 16 mountaineers stranded on Mount Pulag were rescued on October 16. Another 100 mountaineers were rescued in the vicinity of Mount Tarak, near Mariveles, Bataan. Three people were rescued from a flash flood in San Andres, Quezon. Search and rescue teams rescued 100 families in Lagonoy, Camarines Sur. According to the NDRRMC, no fatalities occurred in relation to Sarika in the Philippines. (Note: Local media reported that two were killed and three went missing, but these were not confirmed to be related to Sarika.)

Significant crop damage occurred in the Philippines from the combined effects of Sarika and Typhoon Haima, which struck Northern Luzon a week later. Roughly 394,470 hectares (974,800 acres) of paddy fields were affected – about 15% of the national total. Only 12,118 hectares (29,940 acres) were lost, however, meaning that the typhoons had limited impact on national rice production. Maize and high value crops were also affected, though to a much smaller extent since the harvest had mostly completed in September. Livestock losses and damage to irrigation systems occurred mainly in the Bicol Region. Agricultural damage in the Philippines attributed to Sarika reached ₱3.63 billion (US$76.4 million).

=== China ===
Across South China, total economic losses were valued at ¥5.49 billion (US$826 million), and one person was killed.

==== Hong Kong ====
In Hong Kong, Sarika combined with the northeast monsoon to produce thunderstorms over the territory on October 18 and 19. More than 100 mm (3.9 in) of rain fell over the entire region, with parts of the urban areas, Sha Tin, and Tai Po all recording over 200 mm (7.9 in). The HKO Headquarters recorded their highest October hourly rainfall since record-keeping began in 1884, with 78.7 mm (3.10 in) of rain falling in an hour on October 19. The heavy rains on October 19 resulted in fourteen reports of floods and seven landslides. A shopping mall in Chai Wan was inundated, while floods along roads in Chai Wan and Tai Tam swept away a motorcycle and marooned several cars. Strong winds from Sarika downed many trees, and two people were injured by falling branches. Scaffolding at a building in Sham Shui Po collapsed, and a billboard in Mong Kok was dislodged. Amid rough seas, a boat capsized off the coast of Wang Chau island. Twelve crew members were rescued, but one went missing.

==== Hainan ====
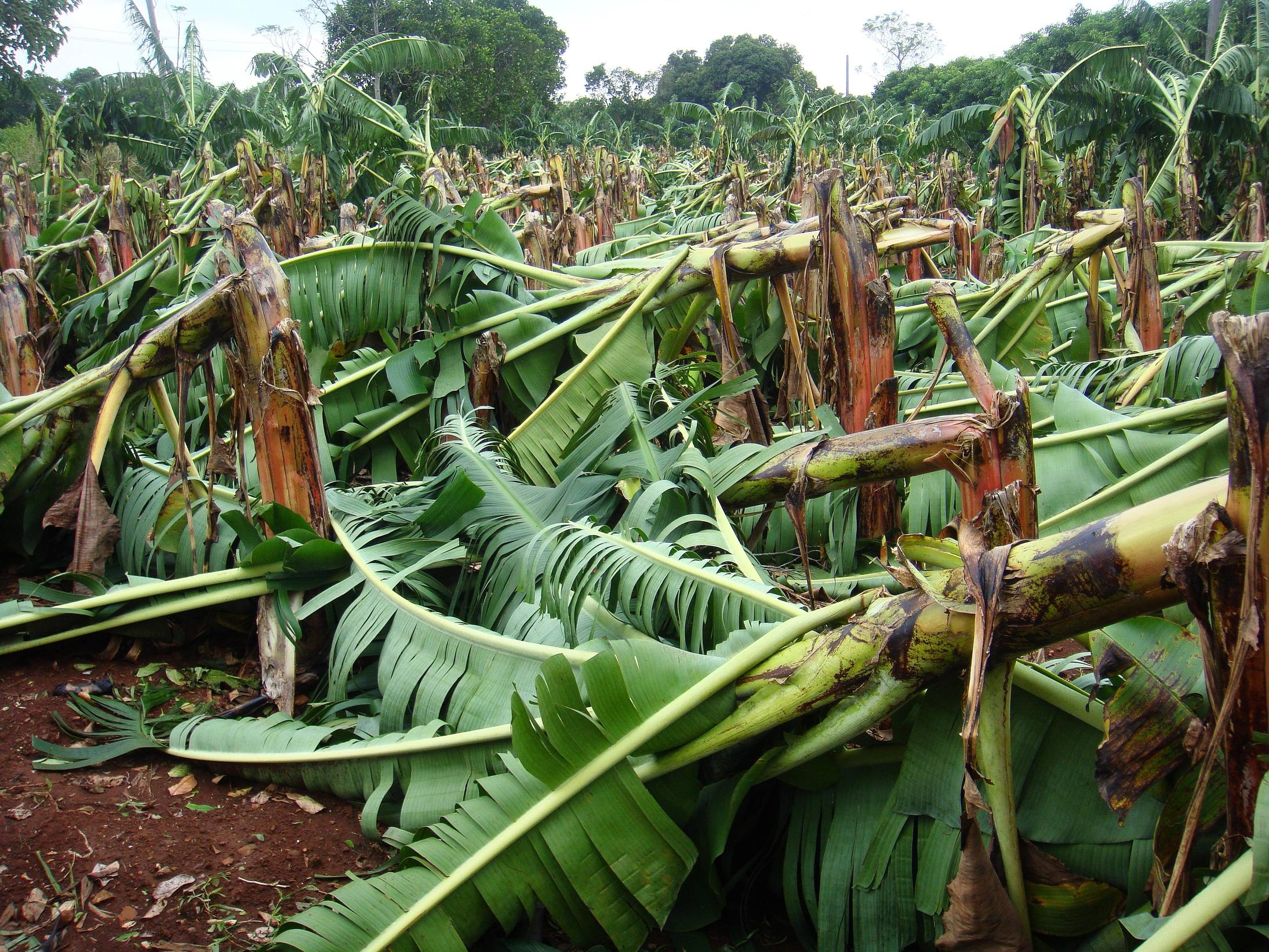
Banana crop destroyed in Hainan

Sarika was the strongest October typhoon to impact Hainan since 1971, possessing wind gusts of up to 162 km/h (101 mph). Across the province, a total of 2.99 million people in 19 counties were affected, though no fatalities resulted. Agricultural damage was widespread, with 380,710 hectares (940,800 acres) of crops affected, of which 97,640 hectares (241,300 acres) was lost. The banana, cassava, and papaya crops were particularly affected. Rubber plantations were also badly damaged, with many trees split or uprooted. The entire island experienced torrential rainfall from October 17 to 20, peaking at 548 mm (21.6 in) at Baitang Reservoir in Ding'an County. Widespread flash floods occurred as a result, and there were many landslides in Central Hainan. In the province, 837 houses collapsed and another 5,100 houses were damaged to varying degrees. Communications were severely disrupted after 7,928 base stations went offline, affecting a total of 129,627 users. Direct economic losses in Hainan reached ¥4.559 billion (US$686.1 million).

Wanning, the landfall point, experienced storm surge, heavy rains, and strong winds that felled several trees. A bus with 45 people on board overturned on a highway, but no one was hurt. A road leading to the coast was blocked by fallen trees. Nearby, large-scale power outages occurred in the urban center of Qionghai, and the main highway into the city was blocked by floodwaters. The capital, Haikou, also experienced flooding. Across the city, many trees and billboards were blown down. The Haikou Century Bridge was shut to traffic until the typhoon passed on October 18, while at least nine bus services were suspended. A total of 31,626 customers lost power in Haikou. Strong winds generated heavy waves along the coast of Sanya, attracting curious onlookers who had to be escorted away by police and government staff for their safety.

==== Guangdong ====
While Sarika did not make landfall in Guangdong, the system brought gusty winds and heavy rainfall to the province. Approximately 235,300 people across 11 counties in Zhanjiang were affected. A total of 117,250 hectares (289,700 acres) of crops were damaged, of which 98,440 hectares (243,300 acres) were deemed a complete loss. Rainfall totals across southwest Guangdong averaged 73 mm (2.9 in). Forty-one people were rescued from a ship that was set adrift near the Port of Zhanjiang after its anchor broke and the backup anchor failed to release. Strong winds damaged 356 base stations in Zhanjiang, requiring 666 support personnel to be dispatched to conduct repair works. Economic losses were estimated at ¥529 million (US$79.6 million).

==== Guangxi ====
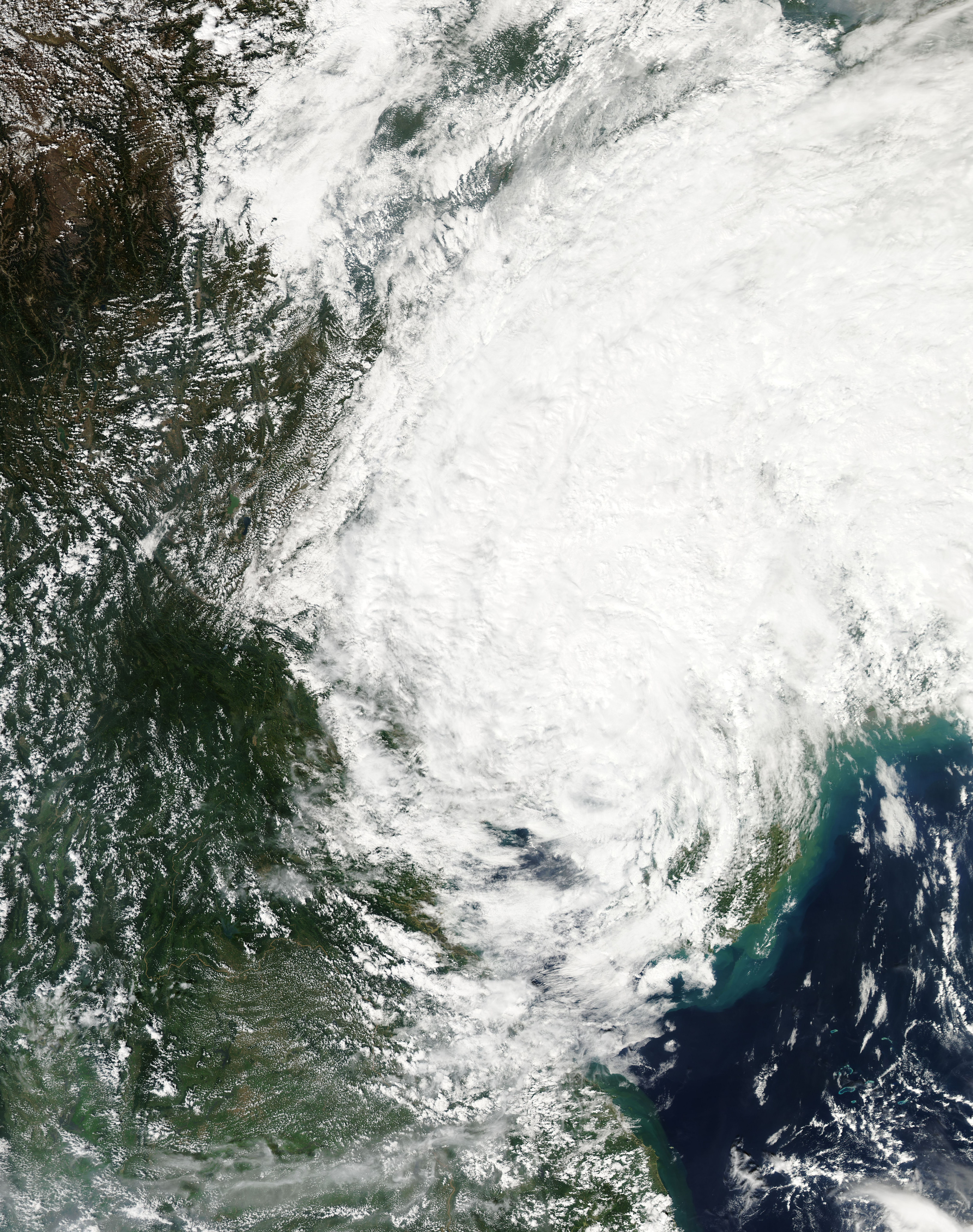
Sarika weakening over Guangxi on October 19

As a weakening system, Sarika affected 333,900 people in Guangxi, mainly through heavy rainfall. Parts of the coast received over 375 mm (14.8 in) of rain over a 26-hour period. Rainfall accumulations in Guangxi averaged 67 mm (2.6 in). Wind gusts in the province reached 90 km/h (56 mph). Power outages were felt across Guangxi, with 250,000 customers experiencing disruptions. A total of 134 houses collapsed. Crop damage spanned 47,620 hectares (117,700 acres), of which 8,460 hectares (20,900 acres) were not salvageable. Direct economic losses were placed at ¥251 million (US$37.9 million).

Sarika's impacts were most severe in the coastal cities of Fangchenggang, Beihai, and Qinzhou. A total of 90,000 customers lost power in Beihai. At the Dianjian Fishing Port in Beihai, six light fishing boats filled up with rainwater and sank. Four of the shipwrecks were successfully raised. In Qinzhou, heavy rains flooded roads and farmlands, and sugarcane crops suffered wind damage. Some trees were blown over, obstructing roads. An improperly secured fishing boat capsized in Qinzhou's Xiniujiao Fishing Port, resulting in the loss of ¥30,000 (US$4,500) worth of equipment. An electrical substation in Liuwu was damaged.

=== Vietnam ===
Sarika brought brief heavy rainfall to northeast parts of Vietnam. Rainfall in Quảng Ninh was measured to be between 50 and 80 mm (2.0 and 3.1 in). Wind gusts onshore peaked at Force 8 on the Beaufort scale, though a weather station on Bạch Long Vĩ Island measured wind gusts up to Force 11. Sarika's effects in Vietnam were less than initially expected as Sarika had weakened into a tropical depression by the time it made its closest approach to Vietnam. People were able to resume normal activities on the afternoon of October 19. (Note: Chinese news sources linked Sarika to flooding in central Vietnam prior to October 18 that killed 30 people and injured 30 more. However, local news stated that these floods were separate from the typhoon.)

== Aftermath ==
After Sarika left the Philippines, the NDRRMC activated the National Response Cluster to coordinate disaster relief. Fifty-four schools were used as evacuation centers. A total of 345 evacuation centers were opened, which were occupied by 35,643 people. Provincial governments dispatched teams to clear roads blocked by fallen trees and posts. In Camarines Sur, water lorries were sent to two barangays in Bula to provide potable water, while water rationing was conducted in Pamplona where water supply had been disrupted. The Philippine National Police deployed patrols to prevent looting and help evacuees return to their homes. The Philippine Red Cross requested a Disaster Relief Emergency Fund of CHF169,000 (US$172,000) from the International Federation of Red Cross and Red Crescent Societies. They distributed 1,600 jerry cans, 1,600 hygiene kits, 1,600 sleeping kits, and 3,200 tarpaulins to 1,600 households across the provinces of Aurora, Batangas, Camarines Norte, Catanduanes, Nueva Ecija, and Nueva Vizcaya. Two months after the storm, the European Commission released €328,000 (US$363,000) in humanitarian aid funding to assist with meeting the immediate needs of those affected by typhoons Sarika and Haima. The Food and Agriculture Organization of the United Nations would later work with the Department of Agriculture until April 2017 to help 4,300 families affected by the two typhoons replant their farms.

In Hainan, as the rain and wind died down, 2,128 police officers and soldiers were activated to conduct disaster relief. Twenty-eight military vehicles distributed ¥5 million (US$750,000) worth of life jackets, life buoys, waterproof bags, generators, and other emergency logistics to affected residents. The Hainan Provincial Department of Civil Affairs distributed 230 tents, 300 blankets, 17,800 boxes of instant noodles, 2,600 boxes of biscuits, 9,300 boxes of instant porridge, 44,000 kg of bread, 14,000 sets of clothing, and 12,400 straw mats to affected cities. Fallen trees blocked the passage of emergency vehicles in some places. Telecommunications operators mobilized 4,816 personnel to work on restoring services, and made services to the province free of charge until October 20. In Guangxi, 870 rescue workers were sent to conduct disaster relief in Fangchenggang. Power companies sent 4,500 personnel and 1,000 vehicles to work on restoring power.

== Retirement ==
On October 26, PAGASA announced that the name Karen would be removed from their naming lists because it had caused over ₱1 billion (US$21 million) in damage. On January 2, 2017, PAGASA chose the name Kristine to replace Karen for the 2020 season.

At the 49th session of the ESCAP/WMO Typhoon Committee held in Yokohama, Japan from February 21 to 24, 2017, the committee announced that the name Sarika would be retired from the typhoon naming lists. At the next session in Hanoi, Vietnam, the Typhoon Committee announced on March 3, 2018 that Trases would be its replacement.

== See also ==
- Weather of 2016
- Tropical cyclones in 2016
- Other tropical cyclones named Sarika
- Other tropical cyclones named Karen
- Typhoon Parma (2009) – struck Hainan and Guangxi in October, but impacted the Philippines much more severely
- Typhoon Conson (2010) – another typhoon with a similar track
- Tropical Storm Nock-ten (2011) – weaker system that took a similar track through the Philippines and Hainan
- Typhoon Nari (2013) – a strong and deadly typhoon that nearly struck the same areas as Sarika
- Typhoon Vamco (2020) – a destructive typhoon that caused widespread flooding in Central and Southern Luzon
- Typhoon Noru (2022) – another typhoon that took a similar path
