= List of storms named Karen =

The name Karen has been used for seventeen tropical cyclones and one subtropical cyclone worldwide: seven in the Atlantic Ocean, nine in the Western Pacific Ocean, one in the South-West Indian Ocean, and one in the Australian region.

In the Atlantic:

- Tropical Storm Karen (1989), formed near Isla de la Juventud
- Tropical Storm Karen (1995), minimal storm that was absorbed by Hurricane Iris
- Hurricane Karen (2001), made landfall at Nova Scotia as a tropical storm
- Hurricane Karen (2007), Category 1 hurricane in the tropical Atlantic
- Tropical Storm Karen (2013), formed in the Gulf of Mexico, later struck the Southeastern US and Mid-Atlantic as a nor'easter
- Tropical Storm Karen (2019), briefly affected Puerto Rico before moving out to sea
- Subtropical Storm Karen (2025), weak and short-lived storm that formed farther north than any Atlantic hurricane on record and did not affect land

In the Western Pacific:

- Typhoon Karen (1948) (T4801), remained over open waters
- Typhoon Karen (1952) (T5209), struck South Korea and Japan
- Typhoon Karen-Lucille (1956) (T5619), crossed northern Philippines
- Typhoon Karen (1960) (T6001, 06W), left 56 dead and 7,000 homeless in the Philippines
- Typhoon Karen (1962) (T6228, 84W), destroyed 95% of the buildings on Guam

After the 1962 season, the name Karen was retired from the international rotating name lists and was replaced with Kim.

The following typhoons were named Karen by PAGASA.

- Typhoon Rananim (2004) (T0413, 16W, Karen), struck China
- Typhoon Nuri (2008) (T0812, 13W, Karen), struck the Philippines and Hong Kong
- Typhoon Sanba (2012) (T1216, 17W, Karen), Category 5 super typhoon that made landfall in South Korea
- Typhoon Sarika (2016) (T1621, 24W, Karen), destructive Category 4 typhoon that struck the Philippines, South China, and Vietnam

The name Karen was retired following the 2016 Pacific typhoon season and was replaced with Kristine.

In the South-West Indian:

- Cyclone Karen (1964)

In the Australia region:

- Cyclone Karen (1977)
