= List of storms named Kristine =

The name Kristine has been used for two tropical cyclones in the Philippine Area of Responsibility by PAGASA in the Western Pacific Ocean. It replaced the name Karen after it was retired following the 2016 Pacific typhoon season.

- Typhoon Haishen (2020) (T2010, 11W, Kristine) – a Category 4-super typhoon that became the third typhoon in two weeks to make landfall in Korea.
- Severe Tropical Storm Trami (2024) (T2420, 22W, Kristine) – caused over 150 fatalities in the Philippines and record-high rainfall in Daet.

The name Kristine was retired following the 2024 Pacific typhoon season and was replaced with Kidul, which refers to the local god of thunder in Kalinga.

== See also ==
- Storm Kristin (2026) – a European windstorm with a similar name.
