= Fajardo River =

River of Puerto Rico

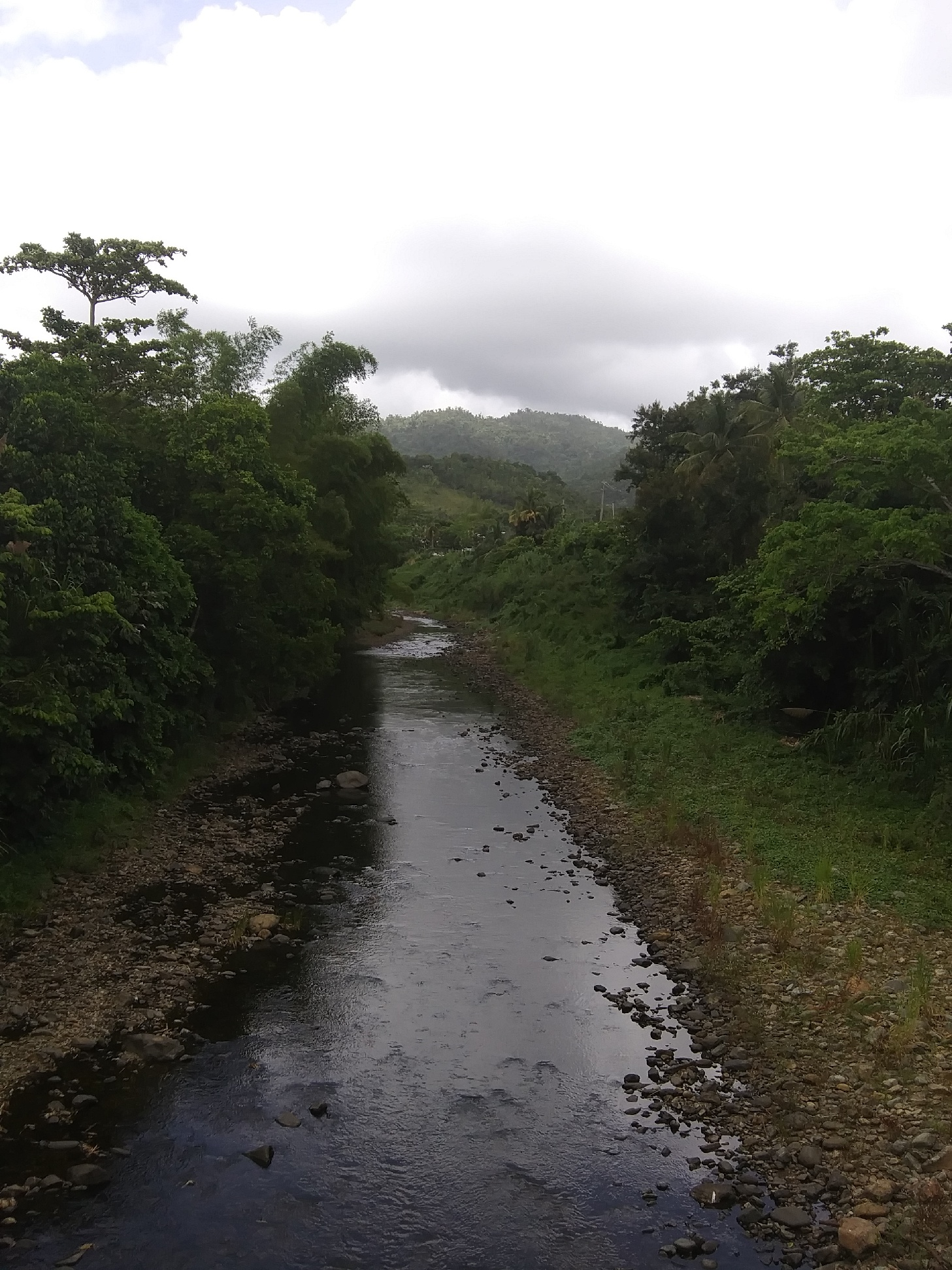
- Fajardo River in Fajardo
- Native name: Río Fajardo (Spanish)

Location
- Commonwealth: Puerto Rico
- Municipality: Fajardo

Physical characteristics
- Source
  - coordinates: 18.3280090°N 65.6273837°W
- Length: 16.35 miles
- Basin size: 26.18 sq ft

Fajardo River (Spanish: Río Fajardo) is a river of Fajardo, Puerto Rico. It crosses Ceiba and Fajardo. It is 16.35 miles long.

It is a scenic river with pools, rapids, an extensive tropical forest.

== Gallery ==
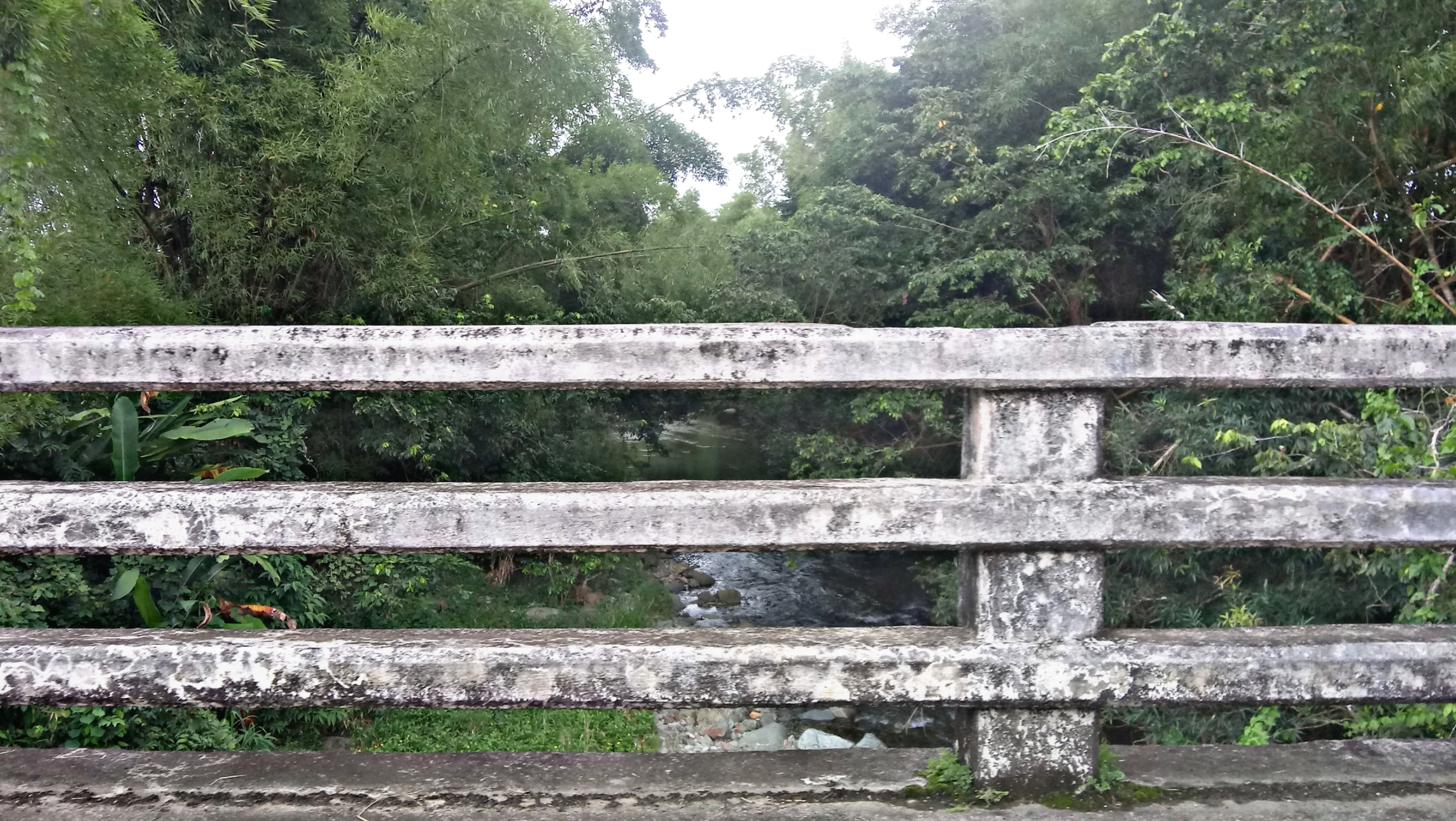
Bridge on PR-971 between Fajardo and Ceiba near Las Tinajas, Charco Frio and Hacienda Tinajas, is just inside the eastern side of the El Yunque National Forest and goes over a portion of the Fajardo River.

== See also ==
- List of rivers of Puerto Rico
