= Tropical Storm Karen (2019) =

Atlantic tropical storm

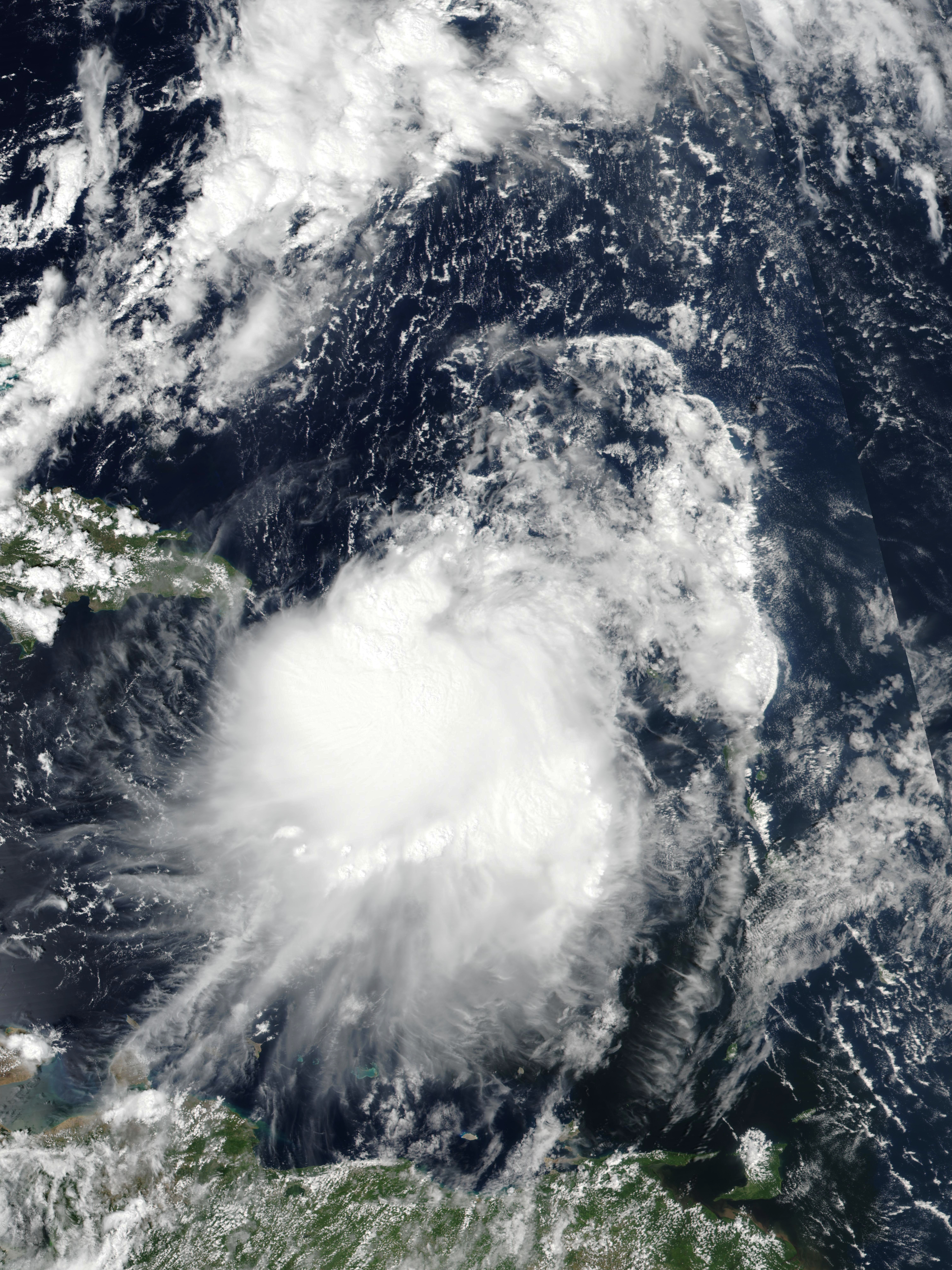
- Tropical Storm Karen moving over the Spanish Virgin Islands on September 24

Meteorological history
- Formed: September 22, 2019
- Dissipated: September 27, 2019

Tropical storm
- 1-minute sustained (SSHWS/NWS)
- Highest winds: 45 mph (75 km/h)
- Lowest pressure: 1003 mbar (hPa); 29.62 inHg

Overall effects
- Fatalities: None reported
- Damage: $3.54 million (2019 USD)
- Areas affected: Windward Islands, Trinidad and Tobago, Venezuela, US Virgin Islands, British Virgin Islands, Puerto Rico
- IBTrACS
- Part of the 2019 Atlantic hurricane season

Tropical Storm Karen was a weak tropical storm that impacted the Lesser Antilles, Virgin Islands, and Puerto Rico in September 2019. The twelfth tropical cyclone and eleventh named storm of the 2019 Atlantic hurricane season, it originated from a tropical wave which entered the tropical Atlantic on September 14. The wave quickly organized as it neared the Windward Islands on September 20, becoming a tropical depression just two days later. The depression strengthened into Tropical Storm Karen later that day, as it moved across the southern Windward Islands. By 18:00 UTC that day, Karen had reached its first peak intensity with 1-minute sustained winds of 45 mph (72 km/h) and a minimum pressure of 1,003 millibars (29.6 inHg). Karen weakened back to a tropical depression at 06:00 UTC on September 23. However, just 12 hours later, Karen re-intensified into a tropical storm. It then entered the central Atlantic, early the next day. Karen began to degrade on September 27, when it weakened into a tropical depression, due to strong wind shear. The system subsequently degenerated into a surface trough later that day.

Karen caused significant flooding and widespread power outages in Trinidad and Tobago. Damage on the island of Tobago reached $3.54 million (2019 USD). Flooding and power outages also occurred in Puerto Rico where roughly 29,000 customers lost electricity. Only minimal impacts were reported in Venezuela, the remainder of the Windward Islands, and the British Virgin Islands.

== Meteorological history ==
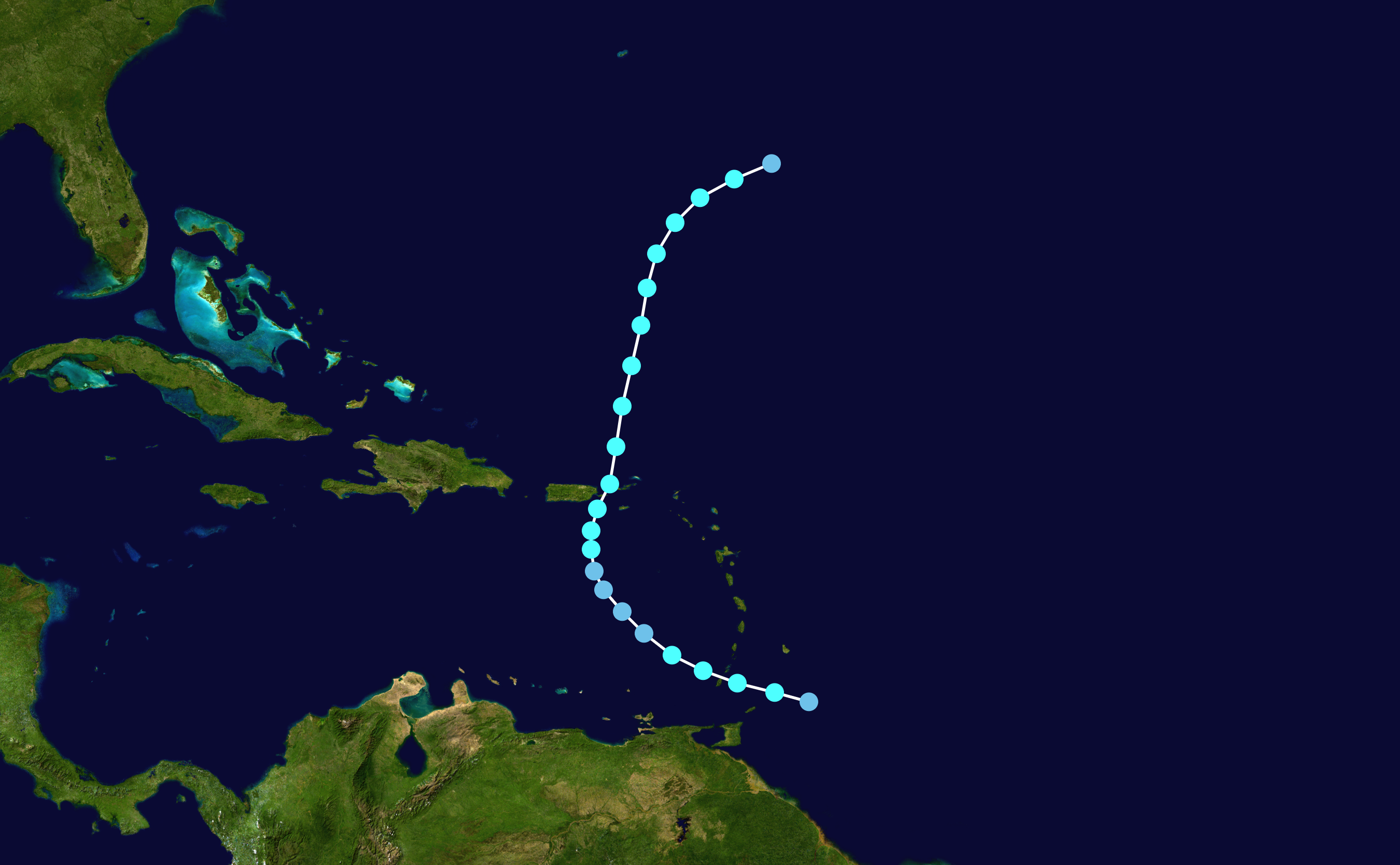
Map plotting the storm's track and intensity, according to the Saffir–Simpson scale Map key Saffir–Simpson scale Tropical depression (≤38 mph, ≤62 km/h) Tropical storm (39–73 mph, 63–118 km/h) Category 1 (74–95 mph, 119–153 km/h) Category 2 (96–110 mph, 154–177 km/h) Category 3 (111–129 mph, 178–208 km/h) Category 4 (130–156 mph, 209–251 km/h) Category 5 (≥157 mph, ≥252 km/h) Unknown Storm type Tropical cyclone Subtropical cyclone Extratropical cyclone, remnant low, tropical disturbance, or monsoon depression

On September 14, a tropical wave moved off the west coast of Africa. The wave was accompanied by a large area of convection, or showers and thunderstorms as it moved over the Cabo Verde Islands. However, convective activity started to become disorganized as the wave moved across the tropical Atlantic. The National Hurricane Center (NHC) began to monitor the system for tropical cyclogenesis on September 18. On September 20, convection began to blossom once more as the wave moved into an area favorable for development. Early the next day, an area of low pressure formed along the wave axis while it was located roughly 575 miles (925 km) east-southeast of the southern Windward Islands. At 00:00 UTC on September 22, the wave organized into a tropical depression while located 115 miles (185 km) east of Tobago. At this time, the system was being steered to the west-northwest along the southern periphery of a subtropical ridge. Just three hours later, the depression organized into Tropical Storm Karen while located roughly 120 miles (190 km) southeast of St. Vincent. At around 12:00 UTC that day, Karen passed through the Windward Islands just north of Tobago.

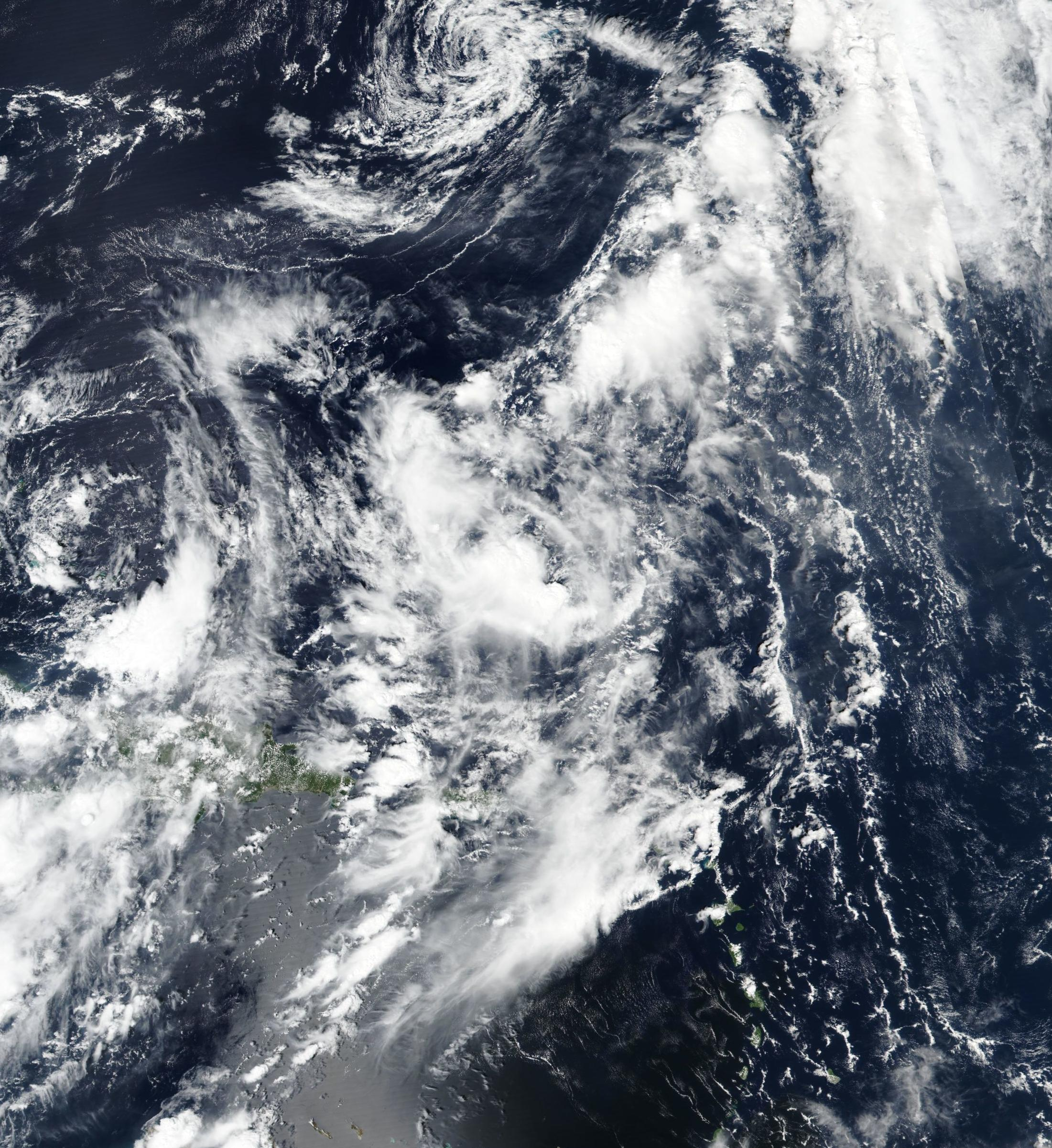
Tropical Storm Karen in the central Atlantic with the remnants of Hurricane Jerry visible to its north

Early on September 23, Karen's convective pattern started to become disorganized as it moved into an area of strong northeasterly vertical wind shear and dry air. At 6:00 UTC on September 24, Karen weakened into a tropical depression as it shifted to the northeast. Early on September 25, deep convection began to slowly increase, however, thunderstorm activity remained south of the center due to north-northeasterly wind shear. Although just a few hours later, thunderstorm activity began to flourish over the storm's center. At 6:00 UTC that day, Karen re-attained tropical storm status while located roughly 90 miles (140 km) southwest of St. Croix. Karen began to slow its forward movement and shift northward around the western periphery of the subtropical ridge. By 18:00 UTC, the storm's center reformed slightly to the west. At 0:00 UTC on September 25, the storm reached its initial peak intensity with one-minute sustained winds of 45 mph (72 km/h) and a minimum central pressure of 1,003 mbar (29.6 inHg), as it moved over the islands of Culebra and Vieques. Later that day, Karen entered the central Atlantic.

On September 26, convection developed over Karen's center. At 9:00 UTC that day, the storm reached its second peak intensity with winds of around 45 mph (72 km/h) and a minimum pressure of 1,004 mbar (29.6 inHg). However, later that day, Karen's circulation became elongated, and weakening occurred early on September 27. A few hours later, the NHC noted that the storm's circulation had attached to a surface boundary that extended from the remnants of Hurricane Jerry. At 12:00 UTC on September 27, Karen degraded into a tropical depression. Just nine hours later, the system degenerated into a surface trough while located roughly 425 miles (684 km) east-southeast of Bermuda.

== Preparations and impact ==
=== Trinidad and Tobago ===
On September 22, a Tropical Storm Warning was issued for Trinidad and Tobago. However, the warning was discontinued just a few hours later. The entire country was placed under a red alert due to the storm. Regional corporations handed out sandbags in parts of eastern and southern Trinidad. Some sports games were delayed or cancelled due to the storm. Caribbean Airlines cancelled numerous flights in the country. Residents of the country were asked to avoid floodwaters for health and safety reasons.

Heavy rainfall caused flash flooding across Trinidad and Tobago. Severe flooding was reported in southwestern Tobago and Scarborough. In Tobago, the Sandy River overtopped its bank, causing flooding in Mason Hall. Nearby, a mudslide caused a road to shut down and a house was destroyed. In Plymouth, seven boats sank after Jetty was damaged. In Mt. Lambert, fields were inundated by floodwaters. However, most of Trinidad was spared from major damage. Some of the worst impacts in the country were located in Tobago. A road in Tobago was littered with downed trees and utility poles. During the storm, 11 boats were destroyed in Roxborough, causing more than TT$1 million (US$148,000) in damage. The Tobago Emergency Management Agency (TEMA) stated that Karen caused TT$24 million (US$3.54 million) in damage in Tobago. TEMA also stated that it had received 88 reports of incidents related to Tropical Storm Karen.

=== U.S. Caribbean territories ===
Radar loop of Tropical Storm Karen moving over the islands of Vieques and Culebra between September 24–25

On September 22, Tropical Storm Watches were first issued in Puerto Rico, including the Spanish Virgin Islands, and the US Virgin Islands. These were upgraded into Tropical Storm Warnings by 9:00 UTC on September 23. All were discontinued by 9:00 UTC on September 25. A flash flood warning was issued for large portions of Puerto Rico by the National Weather Service (NWS). Governor Wanda Vázquez declared a state of emergency for Puerto Rico on September 23. Schools and government buildings were shut down with the threat of heavy rainfall and flooding. Across the island, the government opened 67 shelters. In the U.S. Virgin Islands, schools and government buildings were also closed. Ports were shut down while Seaborne Airlines and Sea Flight cancelled flights between St. Croix and St. Thomas. Also on St. Thomas, traffic was closed on part of Veterans Drive between September 24–25. The Virgin Islands Waste Management Authority advised residents and solid waste haulers that Anguilla's landfill on St. Cross was closed due to deteriorating road conditions. The haulers were asked to hold the waste. Search operations for a 48-year-old woman from Kentucky who went missing at the Virgin Islands National Park had to be briefly suspended due to the storm.

Karen dropped a peak precipitation amount of 5 inches (130 mm) in Coamo, where a bridge was swept away, isolating 15 families. Numerous roads across the island were flooded and became impassible due to mudslides and runoff. River floods were reported in Utuado, Jayuya and Yabucoa municipalities with a mudslide also occurring in Jayuya municipality. The Culebrinas River overtopped its banks, causing flooding in Aguadilla. Roughly 29,000 customers lost electricity in Puerto Rico. A mudslide blocked part of Puerto Rico Highway 14 in Aibonito. In Toa Baja, two people were trapped in a house by flooding. Another home was inundated by floodwaters in the municipality. Flooding trapped one person in their vehicle in Dorado. In the territory, a total of 217 people were displaced by the storm. The director of Puerto Rico's Disaster Management Agency, Carlos Acevedo, stated that Karen caused no major damage in Puerto Rico. In the U.S. Virgin Islands, the storm caused flash flooding, mudslides, and some power outages. Karen set a daily rainfall record at the Cyril E. King Airport in St. Thomas on September 24, with 1.23 in (31 mm) of precipitation being recorded. This broke the former record of 1.02 in (26 mm) from 1990. Foam blocks from a refinery washed onto beaches in southern St. Croix for months after the storm. On September 25, volunteers of the Red Cross assessed damage in six Puerto Rican municipalities. Power restoration in the U.S. Virgin Islands were completed by September 28.

=== Elsewhere ===
When Karen formed on September 22, Tropical Storm Warnings were issued for Grenada and Saint Vincent and the Grenadines. These warnings were cancelled by September 23. Karen caused tropical storm conditions in Grenada, where Flood and Landslide warnings were issued. In nearby Saint Vincent and the Grenadines, a Flood Watch was issued for the country with the threat of heavy rainfall. A government shutdown occurred due to the storm on September 22. The Kingstown port briefly ceased operations that same day. Gusty winds, rough surf, and downed trees were reported on Union Island. Rough seas caused rocks to be pushed up onto a bar at the Liming in Bequia. In Venezuela, heavy rainfall affected Caracas and Güiria. In the latter, some areas lost power and several homes were flooded. On September 23, a Tropical Storm Warning was issued for the British Virgin Islands, which was later cancelled on September 25. In preparation for the storm, both public and private schools were forced to close. Many stores also closed along with banks, some clinics, ports, and airports. Strong winds and heavy rainfall were reported in portions of the islands. Falling trees snapped power lines, causing power outages. However, the Department of Disaster Management recorded no major damage.

== See also ==
- Tropical cyclones in 2019
- Other storms of the same name
- Hurricane Marilyn (1995) — Took a similar track through the eastern Caribbean.
- Hurricane Jeanne (2004) — Affected similar areas upon formation.
- Hurricane Beryl (2018) – Affected similar areas
- Hurricane Beryl (2024) – Affected similar areas
