= 1825 Santa Ana hurricane =

1825 Category 4 Atlantic hurricane

Santa Ana hurricane
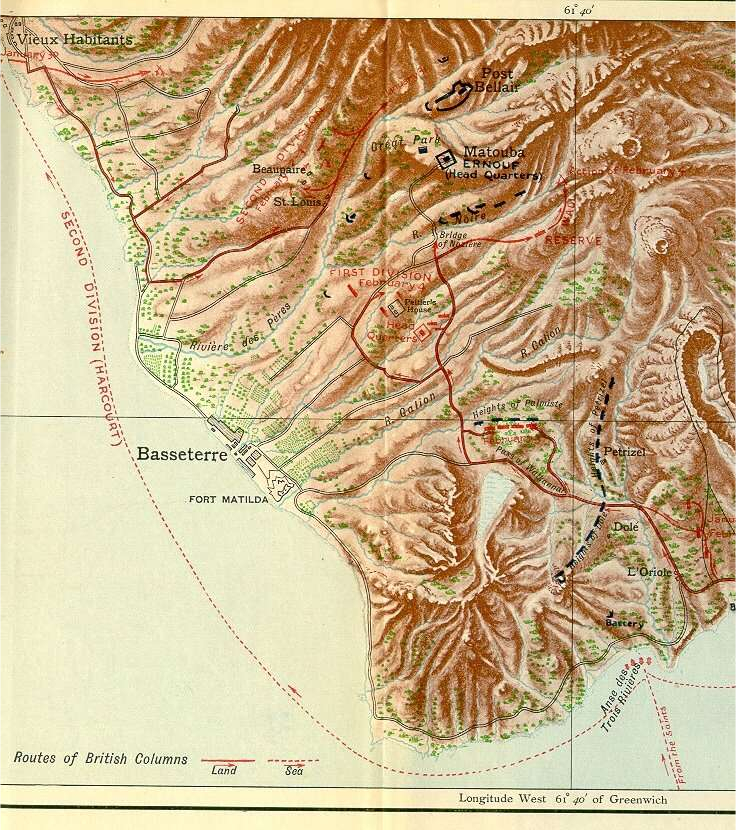
- A map showcasing southwestern Guadeloupe 15 years before it was struck by the hurricane.

Meteorological history
- Formed: Unknown
- Dissipated: August 2, 1825

Category 4 major hurricane
- 1-minute sustained (SSHWS/NWS)
- Highest winds: >150 mph (>240 km/h)
- Lowest pressure: ≤918 mbar (hPa); ≤27.11 inHg (lowest measured)

Overall effects
- Fatalities: >1300 direct
- Injuries: At least 1200
- Damage: Unknown
- Areas affected: Lesser Antilles (especially Guadeloupe), Puerto Rico, Turks and Caicos Islands
- (Note: The peak pressure listed is the lowest recorded throughout the storm, and may be inaccurate. It's possible that a lower pressure went unrecorded.)
- Part of the 1825 Atlantic hurricane season

The 1825 Santa Ana hurricane (/ˈsæntə ˈænə/, SAN-tə AH-nə) was an extremely deadly and record breaking Atlantic hurricane that devastated the Lesser and Greater Antilles in late July. It broke many meteorological records for the month of July and was one of the deadliest Atlantic hurricanes. It is also one of the strongest hurricanes to affect Puerto Rico, only being surpassed by the 1928 Okeechobee hurricane and Hurricane Maria over a century later. (Note: Some estimates indicate it struck Puerto Rico at Category 5 intensity, potentially matching or surpassing the intensity of both storms.) Though in the absence of modern technologies, much of the storm's life and intensity went undocumented.

The storm likely originated as a tropical wave off Cape Verde considering its location and intensity. It was first noted to have impacted Barbados on July 25 before striking Guadeloupe the next day. Afterwards, it continued northwestward before passing by the U.S. Virgin Islands, likely as a Category 4 hurricane. It then made landfall on Puerto Rico with estimated sustained winds of at least 150 mph (240 km/h). This makes it the most intense Puerto Rico hurricane before September, and third strongest since documentation on the island began.

The storm had an unusually sharp wind gradient and was small in size. This may have played a role on its unusual intensity well outside the climatologically favored area for July hurricanes. Only Hurricane Beryl occurred earlier in the season at a similar intensity, east of Jamaica. A later, yet still unusually early Category 4 struck Puerto Rico in August of 1899. The 1926 Nassau hurricane was also another similar record-early Caribbean hurricane; though was much weaker comparably, until later in its journey.

== Meteorological history ==
A hurricane of unknown origins was first noted east of Barbados on July 25 where they were battered by gales. The storm was likely already a major hurricane upon discovery. Later that day around 7 p.m., gales began to pick up in Saint-Pierre, Martinique from the southwest before peaking 2 hours later from the south. They ended around 9 a.m. the next day. On July 26, at about 7 a.m. in Dominica, the winds began to blow with great violence from north, before veering to the northwest and south until around 1 p.m. when they began to abate. On the same day early in the morning, a ship 40 miles southeast of Guadeloupe encountered a heavy gale from the northeast that suddenly shifted to southeast. This suggests that the hurricane passed just north of Dominica and was relatively small in size.

Around 10:30 a.m. that same morning, the hurricane struck Guadeloupe at or near peak intensity. Shortly before landfall, a pressure of ~28.96 inHg (981 mbar) was measured before a drop of 1.86 inHg (63 mbar) occurred. A peak pressure of 918 mbar (27.1 inHg) was then measured which may have set a record for the lowest measurement until the 1924 Cuba hurricane. In 1993, meteorological historian Jose Fernandez-Partagás suggested that the reading may have been inaccurate, and was possibly only ~28.10 inHg (952 mb). However, this is assuming that the first observed measurement for the registered drop of 1.86 inHg (63 mbar) occurred well before the storm at 30.0 inHg (1,020 mb). The barometer was said to have already fallen "several lines below the degree of storm", at ~9 a.m.; a "sinister warning" that announced the approach of the storm. In a later 2005 paper, climate scientist Jeffery P. Donnley suggested it struck the island at Category 5 intensity. The eye likely passed over modern day Basse-Terre before entering the Caribbean sea. Around this time, damaging winds began in St. John's, Antigua. Montserrat then experienced the most violet gale, which commenced around 10:45 a.m. from the southeast. The winds then peaked around 2:30 p.m., suggesting that the storm also began increasing its forward speed in a northwestward trajectory.

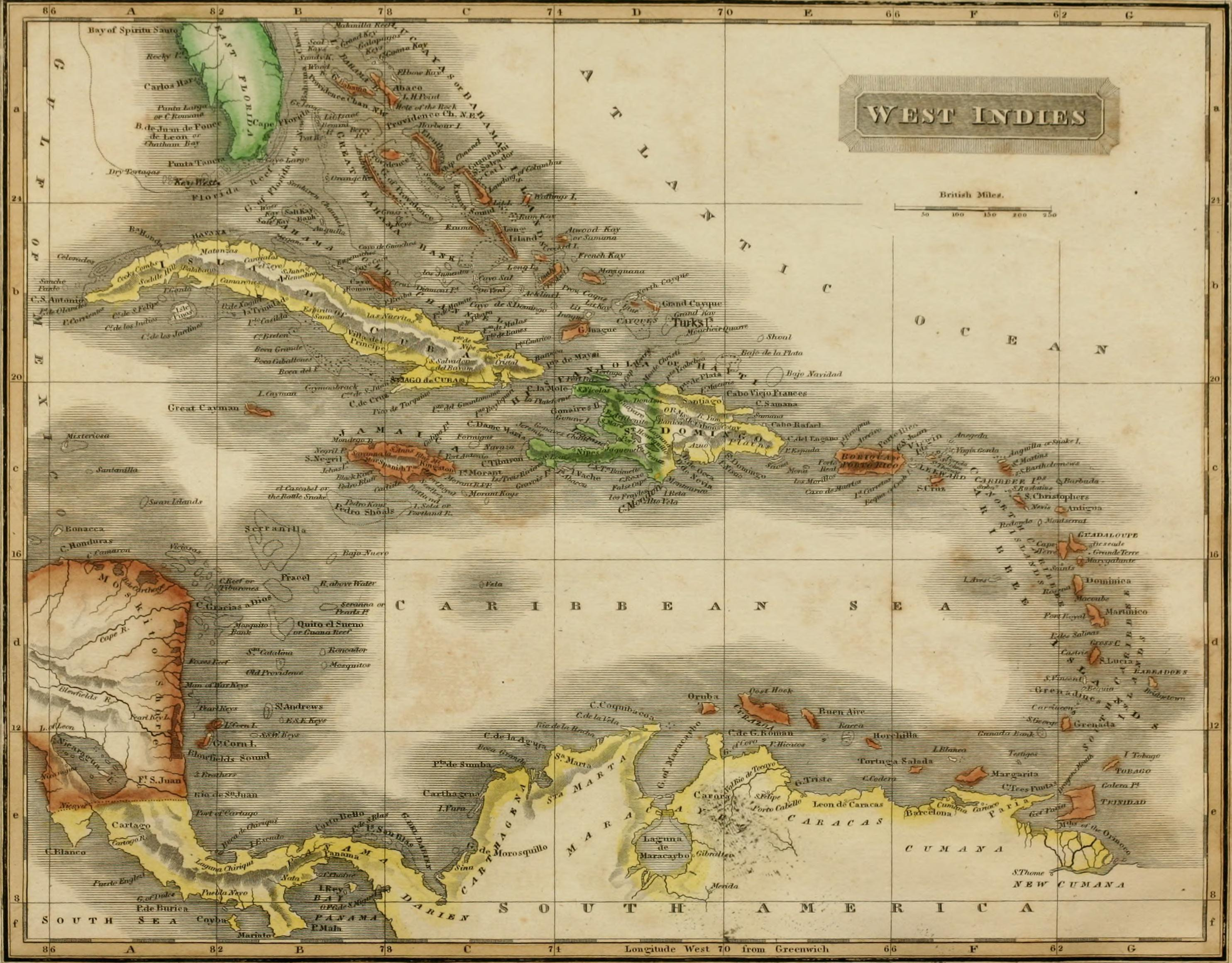
A 1820s map of the Caribbean.

As weather began to clear over the Leeward Islands, "the most dreadful gale of wind the island has ever experienced in the memory of its oldest inhabitants" began over the Danish West Indies (now the U.S. Virgin Islands). Beginning in the early hours from the east, the winds began to increase as noon approached. At 8 p.m., the winds blew from the northeast and continued with "unabated fury" until midnight. It then gradually decreased. The eye may have struck St. Croix, or passed just south of it. If a landfall did occur, it would make it the most intense hurricane to directly strike the island since records began.

On July 26, around 11 p.m., the hurricane made landfall in Puerto Rico somewhere between Humacao & Yabucoa as a high-end Category 4. Sustained winds were estimated to be around 150 mph (240 km/h). If true, this would make it the third most intense hurricane to strike the island since records began. However, it's possible that it was even more intense and even the strongest over the past several hundred years. The storm lasted a couple hours before leaving Puerto Rico somewhere between the Arecibo & Vega Baja area the next day. The storm then continued in a northwest trajectory.

On July 27, the hurricane passed over or just east of the Turks and Caicos Islands. The storm was lasted noted west of Bermuda on August 1. (Note: Time and date shown is local, unless stated otherwise (e.g. track image).)

== Impact ==
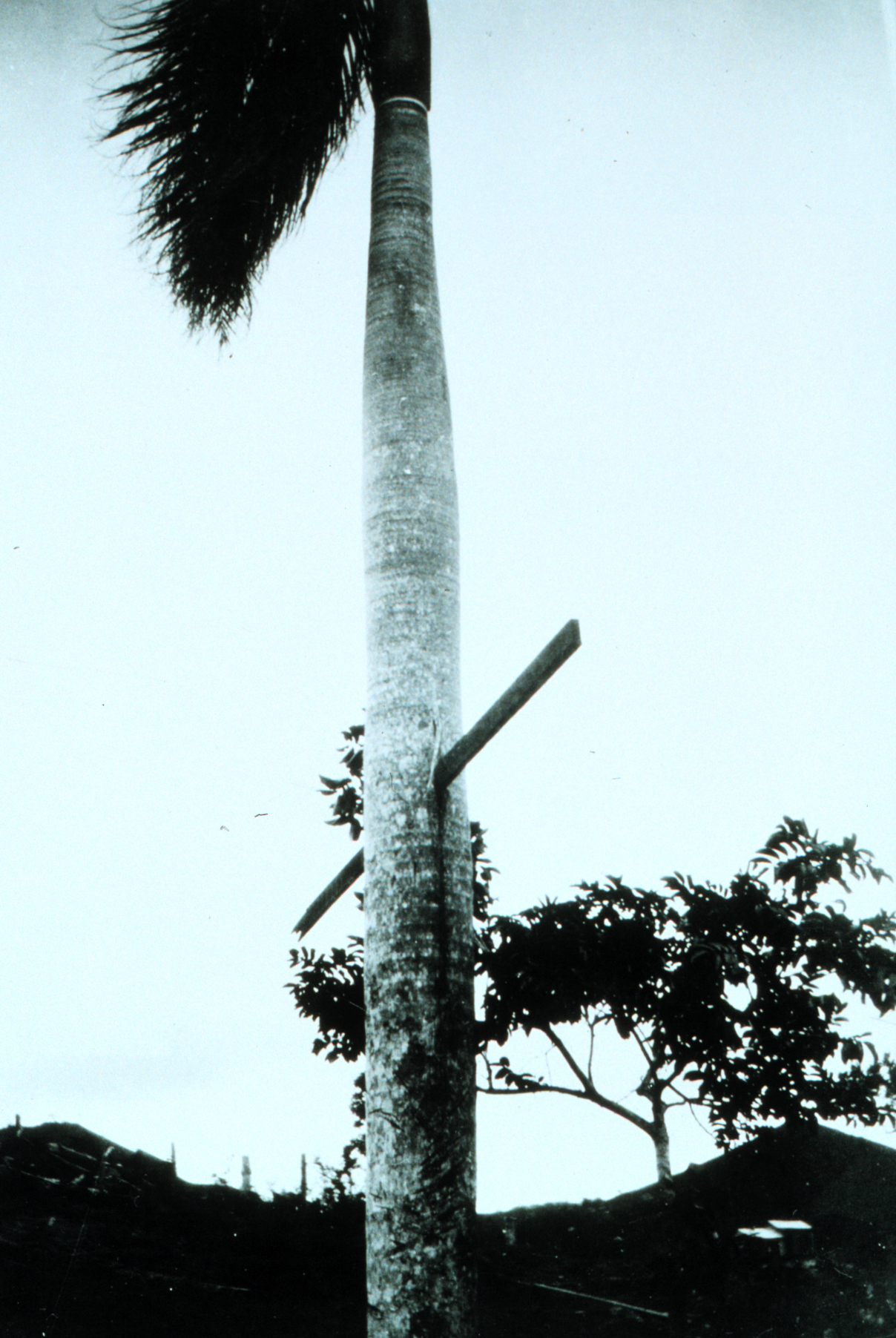
In Guadeloupe, a gust of wind seized a plank an inch thick through the trunk of a 16-inch thick palm tree; much greater than the 2x4 lumber through the 10 inch palm tree shown in this image during a Category 5 in 1928.

=== Lesser Antilles ===
After passing through the Windward Islands, damage was documented on several islands. In Barbados and St. Lucia, considerable damage was done to their shipping. In Martinique, several ships were beached and destroyed.

The Leeward Islands sustained significant damage. In Roseau, Dominica, all vessels, including anchored, were lost. Damages were said to have been "distressing". Antigua reported the loss of many ships, men, and other damage to property. In St. John, mills lost their vanes. Several fatalities also occurred in different bays, including 2 men that drowned in Turtle Bay when their boat sunk.

In Montserrat, considerable damage was done, especially to shipping. Nearly every windmill was injured, while all the provisions for exporting goods were destroyed. It was reported that St. Kitts & Nevis also suffered significant damage.

==== Guadeloupe ====
This hurricane was one of the deadliest and most intense to strike the island since European settlement. The greater area and city of Basse-Terre was hit particularly hard where the entire town was "blown down". Every home, place of work, tree, and government building was reportedly demolished. Hundreds were either crushed, blown away, or carried away by waters. The surge rose into several towns taking many public buildings, houses, and their inhabitants with them. Every crop, vessel, and boat was also reportedly destroyed on the island.

During the storm, a gust of wind lifted a plank an inch (2.54 cm) thick and drove it through the trunk of a palm that was 16 inches (~41 cm) thick. Similar occurrence has been reported since in 1926, 1928, 1992, and 2017; none being as extreme. Parts of destroyed homes and debris were also carried off the island and found in Montserrat approximately 50 miles (80 km) away. Strips of weatherboarding were torn from buildings and driven straight through porch columns as well.

As the hurricane struck southwestern Guadeloupe, an intense earthquake also occurred. Together, the furious winds, tide, and earthquake devastated the region. Several witnesses also documented the most vivid present of lightning and "awful peals of thunder"; a possible indication of rapid intensification. Some accounts even mention that the La Grande Soufrière volcano, which for many years remained dormant, erupted as well. However, this is not currently included in the list of eruptions.

In Basse-Terre, the court, register, record, jail, and hospital buildings were completely obliterated. Immediately after the passing of the storm, the government issued orders to open all the harbors. At least 500 houses were severely damaged or destroyed, while roughly 800 perished in the city alone.

==== U.S. Virgin Islands ====
The destruction on the island was some of the most significant on record since the arrival of Christopher Columbus. Per the arrival of daylight, the harbor was "distressing to look at". Every vessel, with the exception of a few were injured. Every mill point and crop was also reportedly destroyed.

Every building and property was either severely damaged or destroyed in St. Croix.

=== Puerto Rico ===
Despite being one of the few storms to impact the island before August, this was one of the most intense hurricanes to strike Puerto Rico in the last few hundred years. It devastated the cities of Yabucoa, Humacao, Caguas, Cayey, San Juan, Cangrejos, Río Piedras, Guaynabo, Toa Baja, Vega Alta, Vega Baja, and many more to the extent that they nearly "disappeared". Mountains were also reportedly "reduced in size and appearance". Every vessel along the island's coast was either lost or damaged, while crops and villages laid in ruins. The devastation in San Juan was so great that communication was cut off to the rest of the island. Upwards of 600 people perished in Bayamón alone after waters rose and carried them away. Nearly every building along the coast was injured, with many of them "entirely disappearing". The towns of Humacao and Caguas were also "nearly swept away" after taking a direct hit. Plants and vegetation on the island also suffered immensely, with much of it being uprooted.

Because of the storm's small size, much of southwest Puerto Rico was spared. A larger storm would have "destroyed the entire island". The hurricane lasted about 3 hours and was said to have been the most dreadful of any storm before. While the exact death count remains unknown, upwards of 600+ people were killed on the island. Another 1,200 were reportedly injured.

==== Elsewhere ====
Later on July 27, the hurricane passed near or over the Turks and Caicos Islands. Building, property, and stored goods for exporting suffered immensely. Half the quantity of salt was destroyed. A great number of houses were also blown down and destroyed. The hurricane reportedly lasted ~6 hours.

During that same day, the ship "Victory Burns" in the Turk's Island Passage was struck while traveling to Kingston from Philadelphia. All on board perished when the ship sunk. The hurricane then continued northwards off the U.S. eastern seaboard, striking several ships along its way. One ship at roughly 37.0 N and 70.0 W experienced a severe SE wind that shifted to the NW. All belongings and the crew were swept off the deck.

== Name ==
The hurricane was given the name of the date it struck Puerto Rico, which occurred on July 26 - a Roman Catholic day of honor to Saint Anne (also known as Santa Ana). This was a common practice prior to the introduction of standardized hurricane names in 1950. Other examples are the 1867 San Narciso hurricane that struck during the memorial of Saint Narcissus of Jerusalem, and the much too similar 1899 San Ciriaco hurricane that occurred during the Roman Catholic feast day devoted to Saint Cyriacus.

== See also ==
- List of Puerto Rico hurricanes
- List of Atlantic hurricane records
- 1899 San Ciriaco hurricane – Another early season hurricane that struck Puerto Rico at Category 4 intensity.
- 1926 Nassau hurricane – A weaker, but even earlier Puerto Rico hurricane that broke records.
- 1928 Okeechobee hurricane – Another intense hurricane that struck and caused mass devastation in both Guadeloupe & Puerto Rico over a century later.
- 1893 San Roque hurricane – A similar tracking hurricane that went through the Lesser Antilles before striking Puerto Rico.
- Hurricane Maria – A more recent intense hurricane that caused a humanitarian crisis in Puerto Rico.
