= List of Puerto Rico hurricanes =

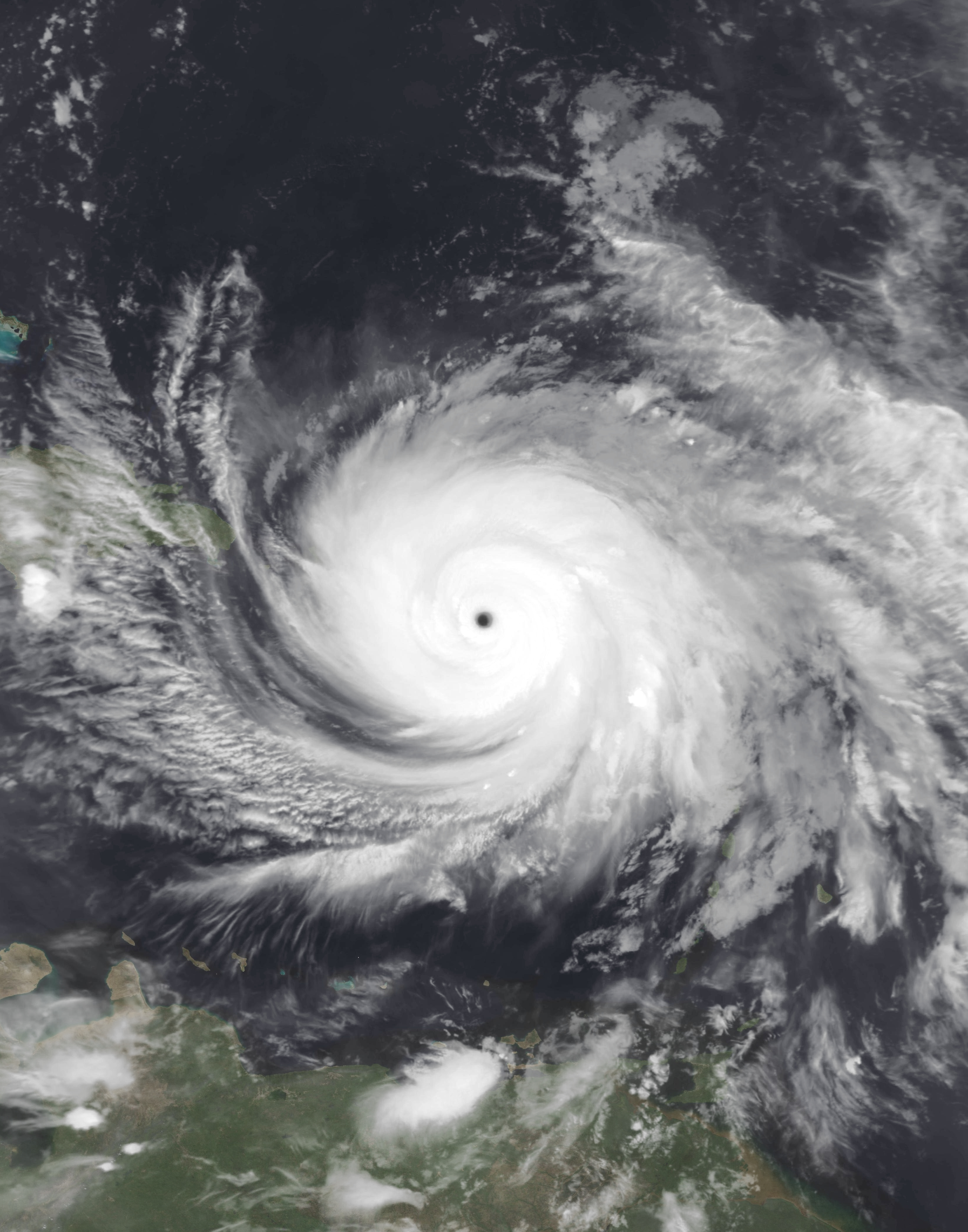
Hurricane Maria southeast of Puerto Rico shortly before landfall

Puerto Rico is an archipelago of 143 islands that is part of the Greater Antilles and located in the northeast Caribbean, west of the Lesser Antilles chain. In five centuries of recorded history, it has experienced the effects of more than 150 Atlantic hurricanes, or storms that were once tropical or subtropical cyclones. Prior to this, these systems were responsible shaping the mythology of the Pre-columbian civilizations of the region, including the Taíno.

The passing of hurricanes over Puerto Rico is noted to be cyclical, often experiencing prolonged periods of inactivity and then a sudden impact by multiple storms. The combination of this with recurrent droughts show how the effects of El Niño and La Niña historically affected the region. In general, the storms that strike during the early months are usually weaker than those in September and October.

== Background ==
=== Pre-Columbian hurricanes ===
During pre-Columbian times, the term juracán was used by Taínos, and it is believed that the Europeans later adapted it into "huracán" or hurricane. The storms shaped the native traditions and lifestyle, with a heavy presence in their mythology. However, there is no definite record of this period, with the first hurricane formally recorded in the West Indies being the one later responsible for sinking the Bobadilla fleet in the Mona Passage.

=== The Spanish period and Catholic naming system ===
On August 16, 1508, Juan Ponce de León reported a storm, which marked decades were these events were reported but not designated due to the inexistence of a naming tradition that early. San Bartolomé broke a nine year hiatus, with Coll y Toste dating it to August 24, 1568. This event lead to the origin of the legend of the miracle of Nuestra Patrona de Guadalupe. It is believed that this was the first phenom officially named after a Catholic saint. Afterwards, a system based on the Spanish variant and honorific of the Saint of the Month was installed, with the day of passing determining the name associated with it. Consequently, many hurricanes of the Spanish period were retroactively named, with the first becoming known as San Roque. Damián López de Haro/Torres Vargas was responsible for the documentation of San Leoncio I and also Santa Cruz.

The first barometric measurement recorded in Puerto Rico took place on August 2, 1837, as Nuestra Señora de Los Ángeles entered, allowing the subsequent classification of it as a Category 2 hurricane. In the coast it caused at least 37 shipwrecks that killed passengers. Rain gauging following soon afterwards. Despite being scientifically studied, the impact of San Evaristo/San Narciso, which happened on October 26, 1853, was mostly salvaged from oral tradition by Víctor Coll y Cuchí. Meteorological study continued solidifying during this time, influenced by the recurrent storms and a series of earthquakes, reaching the masses through the newspapers El Eco and La Gaceta.

The Oficina del Servicio Meteorológico was subsequently established, and amateur research became popular. The adjacent passage of Santa Juana put a system of telegraph emergency response to the test. By this time, the scientific study of the hurricanes and the effect of La Seca (a recurrent period of drought) and post-passage plagues had begun, leading to the first hypotheses. Among jíbaros, a belief that hurricanes followed droughts had emerged from their direct observation of these events, paving the way for these studies. Academically, Caribbean hurricanes have been recorded in literature since at least Benito Vinez in 1877. Subsequent work was published by Vicente Fontan y Mera (San Narciso) in 1878.

=== Modern era ===
The nascent Departamento del Negociado del Tiempo took over the study of storms during the 20th Century. As meteorology advanced and new technologies were introduced, the study and documentation of hurricanes in the region improved significantly. So did the public awareness of their trajectory, facilitated with maps provided in the local media. Aruez y Fernando continued the documentation of hurricanes in 1905 (San Ciriaco). Cayetano Coll y Toste and José Julián Acosta recorded their own lists of cyclones to hit Puerto Rico. Rafael Ramírez's 1932 Los Huracanes en Puerto Rico gave exclusivity to the topic. Luis Salivia would publish a similar work in 1950. Pio Medrano examined the witness documentation listing the effects of several hurricanes and was also responsible for finding the exact date of Santa Cruz.

The name classification was changed, as the religious system used since Spanish times systematically made way for the American system. On August 12, 1956, Category 1 hurricane Betsy was the first to be classified in this manner, tough its traditional name of Santa Clara was still widely used, causing 16 deaths and notable building/agricultural losses in a quick traverse. This was also the first storm recorded by radar in Puerto Rico. In 1995, Edwin Miner published Historia de los Huracanes en Puerto Rico. In the 21st century, Pío Medrano and Stuart Schwarts further elaborated on the matter.

=== Socioeconomic effects ===
From the beginning of the Spanish colonization, the constant influx of storms in the region made the Europeans consider leaving the island, partly due to being caught unprepared for the extent of their effects.

== List of storms ==
=== 16th century ===
- August 12–14, 1508 – An unnamed tropical cyclone affected southern Hispaniola and may have affected southern Puerto Rico.
- August 16, 1508 – Hurricane San Roque is considered to be the first recorded hurricane to affect Puerto Rico. Reported by Juan Ponce de León, his caravel left Santo Domingo, but another storm after the preceding storm beached it on the southwest coast of Puerto Rico at Guayanilla. It mainly affected the southwest coast of the island.
- July 1514 – An unknown tropical cyclone affected Puerto Rico and was reported months afterwards. Historian Jalil Sued Badillo argues that the first local insurrection of African slaves, exploited this phenom to attack the unsuspecting Spaniards.
- July 4, 1515 - Hurricane San Laureano passed over Puerto Rico, killing many among the remaining Taíno population.
- October 4–5, 1526 – Hurricane San Francisco made landfall and progressed westward or west-northwestward and therefore also might have affected the northern group of the Leeward Islands and the Virgin Islands. A violent hurricane moved slowly over northern Puerto Rico on 4 and 5 October. The storm started at night, lasted 24 hours, and ruined the major part of the City of Caparra, Puerto Rico, including the church, and caused much damage to haciendas, agriculture, and wide spread flooding. One source describes the storm in both 1526 and 1527.
- July 28, 1530 – Hurricane Santa Catalina made landfall on Puerto Rico and was the first of three tropical cyclones to affect the island that year. The island only had population of 3,100 at the time. This storm is also known as Santa Ana, with several historians (including Alejandro Tapia y Rivera) listing a date of July 26, 1530, which is now believed to be inaccurate. Witness testimony also stated that the San Juan hospital was damaged, three vessels were lost at port, several municipalities and haciendas were severely damaged and mines were damaged, the total loss was estimated at over 100,000 gold pesos.
- August 22, 1530 – Hurricane San Hipólito affected Puerto Rico as a weak hurricane or tropical storm bringing heavy rain. It has also been listed as San Timoteo.
- August 31, 1530 – Hurricane San Ramón Nonato affected Puerto Rico as a violent hurricane that struck Puerto Rico nine days later after the San Hipólito hurricane. Floods isolated communities and drowned an uncounted number of persons to death. The hurricane greatly damaged livestock and agriculture and so distressed the Spanish colonists that they considered abandoning Puerto Rico altogether. The sanitary conditions caused outbreaks that killed hundreds of Taínos and African slaves. The barrage of hurricanes during 1530 brought a condition of great suffering and poverty on Puerto Rico, which persisted for several years. This marked the first time that three hurricane landfalls were recorded during a season.
- 1535 - Historian Coll y Toste records the passing of an unnamed storm or hurricane during this year. Elsa Gelpi lists a storm passing in 1559.
- July or August, 1537 – A series of three tropical cyclones affected Puerto Rico causing the destruction of river banks and plantations, as well as growing many cattle and slaves. Their exact dates are contested, with Alejandro Tapia's estimate being adopted informally. The first was San Pío (c. July 11, 1537), the second San Román (c. August 9) and the third remains undated (it took place prior to September 4). The flooding caused losses that included African slaves and cattle, leading to a request of resources and population to the Crown. The storm caused Puerto Ricans in great hardship and increased the desire of its citizens to migrate.
- September 7, 1545 – Unnamed hurricane heavily affected Hispaniola and is presumed to have affected Puerto Rico.
- September 1559 - A strong tropical storm or hurricane struck Puerto Rico, leading to the governor requesting the gathering and redistribution of food resources to be distributed among the poor.
- August 24–24, 1568 – Hurricane San Bartolomé made landfall in Puerto Rico and caused widespread damage in San Juan and in Santo Domingo in the Dominican Republic. First hurricane to be named with "Saint of the Day" affecting Puerto Rico (previous ones back to 1508 were labeled by historians).
- September 12, 1575 – San Mateo hurricane was a severe hurricane that affected Puerto Rico as a tropical storm struck the island on double of Saint Matthew. Last recorded tropical storm to impact Puerto Rico during sixteenth century. Due to causing losses of cattle and crops, the phenom stuck in oral tradition for decades.
- 1591 - According to historian Pio Medrano, a storm passed resulting in the destruction of resources and other losses.
- October 28, 1591 - Hurricane San Simón caused the destruction of the flora and the drowning of cattle.

=== 17th century ===
- September 12, 1615 – Hurricane San Leoncio made landfall and was the first hurricane to affect the island in the seventeenth century. Caused extensive damage to Cathedral of San Juan Bautista, to the agriculture, and to sugar crops. Colonial governor Felipe de Beaumont y Navarra asked help from the Crown, citing besides the damage that Puerto Rico had not fully recovered from the pirate attacks that took place late in the previous century. The Consejo de Indias interviewed witnesses prior to accepting the request. At Coamo, the damage prevented the payment of the local priest, prompting them to request that the situado was used to cover the expense on August 16, 1616. However, a year later the situation remained unchanged, prompting the governor to ask for the use of bricks being used at El Morro for the reconstruction. The Crown's response was slow and included some 4,000 ducats for the repair of the Cathedral.
- September 15, 1626 – San Nicomedes hurricane made landfall in Puerto Rico as a tropical storm and sank three ships in the bay of San Juan.Millás 1968 Cayetano Coll y Toste wrote of this storm, which occurred the year after Battle of San Juan (1625), which ruined large portions of the city including most of the buildings left standing after the foreign incursion. The storm destroyed plantations and limited the supply of cassava bread. The storm lasted a whole day and at least 22 deaths were reported, as were damages to the convents of Santo Tomás de Aquino and Santo Domingo. Colonial governor Juan de Haro listed the damaged in a preliminary report to the Crown, which lead to the usual process involving the Council of the Indies.
- 1635 - Reported by colonial governor Iñigo de la Mota Sarmiento, exact date unknown.
- 1636 - Also reported by the governor, who noted that in combination with the previous storm it had caused a shortage of fruits and cattle.
- September 1642 – Unnamed hurricane as day of storm is unknown. Based on reports, was a strong and large size hurricane that caused damage to the Cathedral of San Juan, houses, huts and destroyed crops and the vegetation. It has been listed as Santa Cruz due to estimates placing its passing on September 14, 1642.
- 1649 - Exact date unknown and losses unknown.
- September 5, 1650 – Hurricane San Lorenzo Justiniano, passed over Puerto Rico, damaging buildings and causing a shortage of food. In response, colonial governor Diego Aguilera y Gamboa sent a vessel to South America to purchase supplies.
- August 1657 – Unnamed hurricane as day of storm is unknown. Destroyed 20 houses and caused significant damage to agriculture and crops on the island. The destruction caused another shortage of food, forcing the purchase of supplies from abroad. It took two years to recover and the production of cacao was among the most affected. Aid from Spain did not arrive properly until 1659 and the aid for the Church took another year.
- 1665 - Exact date unknown and there is limited information about its effects.
- 1666 - Exact date unknown, damaged the cacao plantations.
- September 5, 1667 - A hurricane caused damages to the San Felipe Castle and left lasting effects that extended at least four years. Historian Salvador Perea is responsible for the approximate date.
- 1678 - A hurricane is said to have affected the islands, its documentation was limited to mentions by the Gaceta de Puerto Rico during the 19th Century.
- 1693 - A tropical storm or rain event destroyed several crops.

=== 18th century ===
- July 13, 1700 – According to priest Juan Bautista Labat, a storm affected the south of Puerto Rico.
- September 6, 1713 – Hurricane San Zacarias caused storm surge in the southern coast and extensive damage.
- October 3, 1713 – Tropical Storm San Cándido came close to Puerto Rico and affected all the Dominican Republic. Caused storm surge to the south coast.
- September 7, 1718 – Tropical Storm Santa Regina caused damage in San Juan after making landfall in Puerto Rico.
- August 30, 1730 – Tropical Storm Santa Rosa, also known as Juan de Mayorga, passed over Puerto Rico and ended a drought that had affected the southern coast.
- August 30, 1738 – Hurricane Santa Rosa was a hurricane coming exactly eight years after the 1730 tropical storm. It made landfall and crossed over the entire island, then passed on to the Dominican Republic. San Juan was very affected.
- September 12, 1738 – Hurricane San Leoncio III was the second hurricane to make landfall in Puerto Rico this year. The crop and cattle loss combined with the damage already caused by the previous storm convinced settlers from Ponce and Coamo to leave for some time.
- August 3, 1740 – Hurricane San Esteban made landfall in Puerto Rico.
- September 11–12, 1740 – Hurricane San Vicente, caused severe crop and cattle losses.
- October 28, 1742 – Hurricane San Judas Tadeo, affected the southern coast.
- August 18, 1751 – Tropical Storm San Agapito made landfall in Puerto Rico.
- September 19, 1766 – Hurricane San Jenaro was the first hurricane to make landfall in Puerto Rico this year.
- October 7–8, 1766 – Hurricane San Marcos was the second hurricane to make landfall in Puerto Rico this year. Caused large floods and the losses of buildings, ships, crops and road infrastructure. According to Tomás de Córdova, the towns of Fajardo, Loíza, Caguas, Las Piedras, Guayama, Cangrejos and Río Piedras were most severely affected and a plague followed it.
- August 7, 1767 – Hurricane San Cayetano, brought floods that affected the cattle and crops.
- July 16, 1772 – Hurricane Nuestra Señora del Carmen made landfall.
- August 28–29, 1772 – Hurricane San Agustín made landfall in Puerto Rico. According to Fray Iñigo Abbas y Lasierra passed over relatively quickly. Andrés Pedro Ledru claimed that several died trapped within their houses. Floods destroyed crops, the roads were blocked and several vessels were wrecked in the southern coast.
- August 31, 1772 – Hurricane San Ramón, may have been the remants of San Agustín.
- August 1, 1775 – Tropical Storm San Pedro, reported as a weak storm.
- September 7, 1776 - Tropical Storm San Regina passed without causing much damage.
- June 13, 1780 – Hurricane San Antonio was the first hurricane to make landfall in Puerto Rico this year. "caused deaths and losses" on Puerto Rico, after having also struck St. Lucia, where it killed around 4,000 to 5,000 people. It is also known as the St. Lucia Hurricane. Tomás de Córdova records San Antonio causing the shipwreck of a British frigate off Guayama. It later went on to the Dominican Republic.
- October 14, 1780 – "Great Hurricane," also known as the San Calixto hurricane, was a tropical cyclone that killed an estimated 20,000-22,000 people and had winds of 200 mph. The hurricane paralleled the southern coast of Puerto Rico before making landfall in the southwestern tip of the island. It subsequently turned to the northwest, going through the Mona Passage before passing near the present-day Dominican Republic province of Samaná.
- September 25, 1785 – Tropical Storm San Lupo made landfall in Puerto Rico.
- August 16, 1788 – Hurricane San Roque

=== 19th century ===
- September 4, 1804 – Hurricane Santa Rosalía
- September 21, 1804 - Hurricane San Mateo II.
- September 11, 1806 – Hurricane San Vicente II, recorded by Tomás de Córdova.
- August 17–19, 1807 – Hurricane San Jacinto made landfall in Puerto Rico. According to Tomás de Córdova its effects lasted 50 hours and caused large scale floods, killing settlers and cattle, destroying buildings and ravaging crops. It has been speculated that the event forced the municipality of Aguadilla to move its Plaza due to the presence of an overflowing river.
- September 2, 1809 - Hurricane San Esteban II.
- July 23, 1813 – Tropical Storm San Liborio was the first cyclone to make landfall in Puerto Rico this year
- August 21, 1813 – Tropical Storm Santa Juana was the second storm to make landfall in Puerto Rico this year.
- July 23, 1814 – Tropical Storm San Liborio made landfall in Puerto Rico.
- September 18–20, 1816 – Hurricane San José de Cupertino made landfall in Puerto Rico.
- September 22, 1818 – Tropical Storm San Mauricio made landfall in Puerto Rico.
- September 21–22, 1819 – Hurricane San Mateo III made landfall in Puerto Rico. It caused the shipwreck of several vessels, destroyed several houses, buildings and crops.
- September 9–10, 1824 – Hurricane San Pedro, also known as La Monserrate.
- July 26–27, 1825 – The Santa Ana hurricane was one of the deadliest and most intense tropical cyclones to affect the island. It also had one of the earliest landfalls since record-keeping began. Around 11 p.m. on July 26, it struck somewhere between Humacao and Yabucoa as a high-end Category 4. Sustained winds were estimated to be around 150 mph (240 km/h). Due to the storm's small size, much of southwest Puerto Rico was spared. The hurricane lasted about 3 hours and was said to have been more dreadful than any storm before. While the exact death count remains unknown, upwards of 600+ people were killed on the island. Another 1,200 were reportedly injured. This storm remained ingrained in folklore for years, remembered as the most devastating event of its type in the century.
- August 17, 1827 – North Carolina hurrican, also known in Puerto Rico as the San Jacinto hurricane, made landfall as a tropical storm on the island. It passed as the island was still recovering from Santa Ana, causing moderate damage to the same eastern municipalities affected by its predecessor, as well as those in the south.
- August 13, 1835 – Hurricane San Hipólito made landfall in Puerto Rico. It caused damage to crops, floods and agricultural loses.
- August 2–3, 1837 – Hurricane Nuestra Señora de los Angeles made landfall in Puerto Rico.
- August 18, 1851 – Hurricane San Agapito Also known as Santa Elena.
- September 5, 1852 – Hurricane San Lorenzo made landfall in Puerto Rico.
- October 26, 1853 - Hurricane San Evaristo, otherwise known as San Narciso I.
- October 29, 1867 – Hurricane San Narciso II made landfall in Puerto Rico. Estimated to have been a Category 1 or 2, it entered from the north, causing 211 deaths and losses ascending to 12,860,642 escudos.
- August 21, 1871 – Hurricane Santa Juana
- September 13, 1876 – Hurricane San Felipe made landfall in Puerto Rico It entered through Humacao/Yabucoa causing 19 deaths and 91,221 pesos in damage. This phenom was thoroughly researched as part of a report, and was measured by at least two different sources.
- November 28, 1878 – Tropical Storm San Rufo made landfall in Puerto Rico. As an offseason storm, its exact nature is still debated.
- September 1–2, 1888 – Hurricane San Gil passed north of Puerto Rico, but its remnants caused severe floods and 95 deaths.
- September 3–4, 1889 – Hurricane San Martín
- August 19–20, 1891 – Hurricane San Magín
- August 16–17, 1893 – Hurricane San Roque III made landfall in Puerto Rico. It entered at Patillas/Maunabo and passed throughout Puerto Rico causing the usual damage and affecting the telegraph lines.
- August 31–September 1, 1896 – Hurricane San Ramón Nonato III made landfall in Puerto Rico.
- August 8, 1899 – Hurricane San Ciriaco was a major hurricane that made landfall in Puerto Rico. A category 2/3 hurricane San Ciriaco closed the century by affecting all of the island for an entire day and causing large scale floods that resulted in 3,369 deaths and an excess of fifty million dollars in damage. This combined with the destruction of crops and loss of cattle, labeled this as the deadliest storm in the history of Puerto Rico up to that point and for more than 115 years. The 19th remains the most active century on record.

=== 20th century ===
- July 7, 1901 – Tropical Storm San Cirilo made landfall in Puerto Rico.
- September 11–12, 1901 – Tropical Storm San Vicente made landfall in Puerto Rico.
- September 6–7, 1910 – Hurricane San Zacarias It became stronger as it passed and caused enough confusion to lead to an announcement that two events had struck on the same day.
- August 11, 1915 – Galveston hurricane, known as the San Tiburcio hurricane in Puerto Rico.
- July 13, 1916 – An unnamed hurricane made landfall in Puerto Rico as a tropical storm, making it the first cyclone to strike Puerto Rico this year.
- August 22, 1916 – Hurricane San Hipólito was the second storm to make landfall in Puerto Rico this year.
- September 4, 1919 – The Florida Keys hurricane made landfall in Puerto Rico as a tropical storm.
- September 9–10, 1921 – Hurricane San Pedro Claver II
- July 23, 1926 – Hurricane San Liborio IV made landfall in the southwestern tip of Puerto Rico. It caused at least a dozen deaths, affected crops and buildings

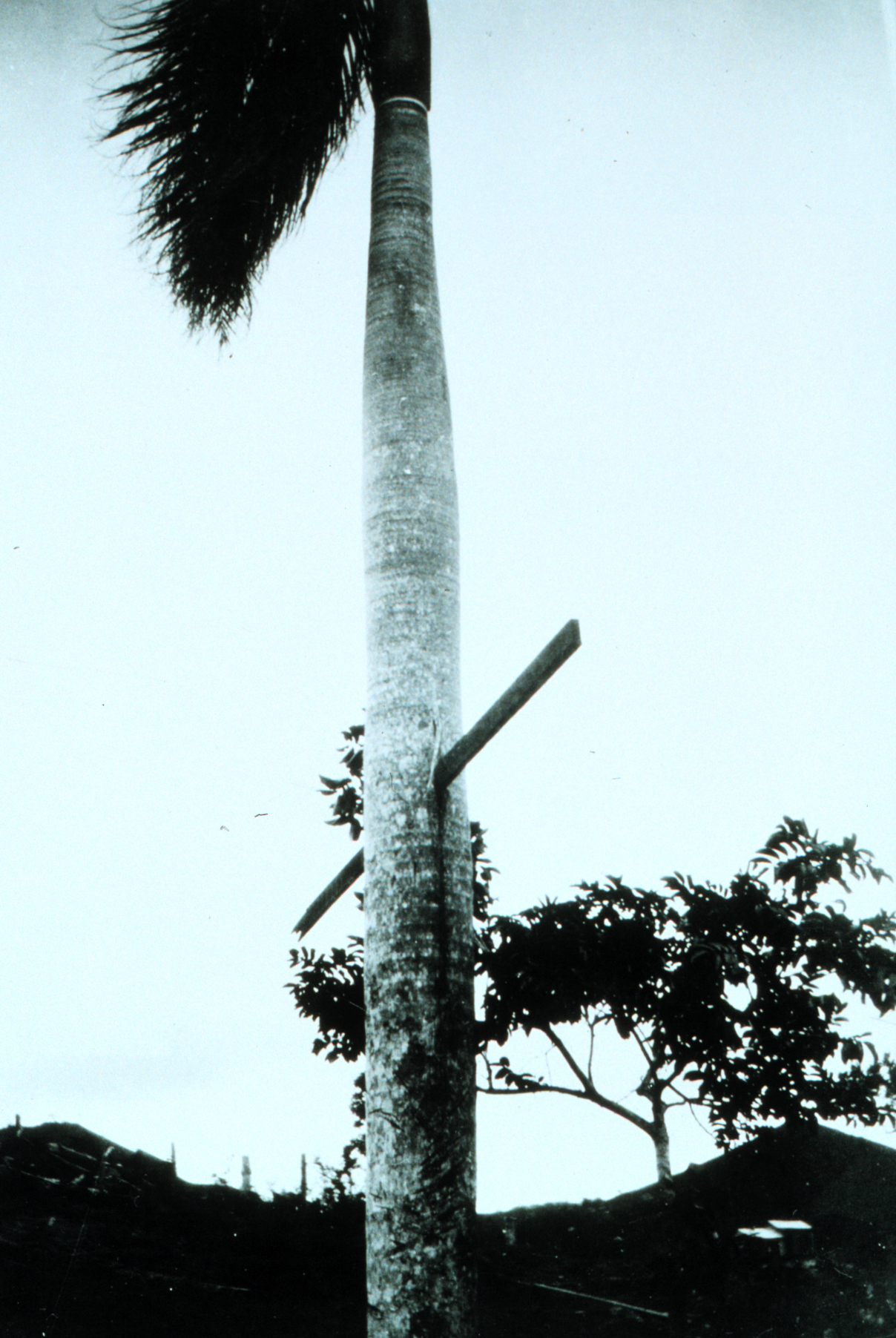
Hurricane-force winds drove this 10-foot (3 m) piece of 2x4 lumber through a palm tree in Puerto Rico during the 1928 Okerchobee hurricane, known in Puerto Rico as the San Felipe II hurricane

- September 13, 1928 – Okeechobee hurricane, also known as the San Felipe II hurricane, was a major hurricane that made landfall near Guayama as a Category 5 hurricane, the strongest on record to strike the island. On September 13, the 15 mi (24 km) eye crossed Puerto Rico in eight hours from the southeast to the northwest, moving ashore near Guayama and exiting between Aguadilla and Isabela. A ship near the southern coast reported a pressure of 931 mbar (27.5 inHg), and the cup anemometer at San Juan reported sustained winds of 160 mph (257 km/h) before failing. As the wind station was 30 mi (48 km) north of the storm's center, winds near the landfall point were unofficially estimated as high as 200 mph (320 km/h). On this basis, the hurricane is believed to have made landfall in Puerto Rico as a Category 5 hurricane on the Saffir–Simpson scale, although there was uncertainty in the peak intensity, due to the large size and slow movement of the storm. Despite a two-day warning and preparations, caused 312 deaths, destroyed numerous houses and buildings, massive economic loses were reported by the agricultural industries and communications were disabled. After emerging from Puerto Rico, the hurricane had weakened to winds of about 140 mph (230 km/h), based on a pressure reading of 941 mbar (27.8 inHg) at Isabela.
- September 10–11, 1931 – San Nicolás hurricane made landfall in Puerto Rico.
- September 26–27, 1932 – San Ciprian hurricane was a major hurricane which made landfall in Puerto Rico. It entered through Ceiba, killing 225, destroying crops and devastating the infrastructure of the northern municipalities as it completed its trajectory along that coast.
- October 14, 1943 – Hurricane San Calixto III
- September 21, 1949 – Hurricane San Mateo IV
- August 23, 1950 – Hurricane Baker made landfall in the town of Guánica as a weak tropical storm.
- August 12, 1956 – Hurricane Santa Clara, officially known as Hurricane Betsy, made landfall as a Category 1 hurricane.
- September 5–6, 1960 – Hurricane Donna, passed near the northern coast, causing large scale floods that led to 137 deaths.
- October 2–3, 1961 – Tropical Storm Frances
- September 26, 1963 – Hurricane Edith
- August 23, 1964 – Hurricane Cleo
- August 26, 1966 – Hurricane Faith
- September 28, 1966 – Hurricane Inez
- September 9, 1967 – Hurricane Beulah
- 1970 – Caribbean–Azores hurricane struck Puerto Rico as a tropical depression, it was the wettest tropical cyclone on record to affect Puerto Rico. The depression left 10,000 people homeless across Puerto Rico, with 3,000 housed in emergency shelters in San Juan. At least 600 houses were destroyed and another 1,000 damaged. Damage was particularly severe in Barceloneta, Aibonito, and Coamo. Across the island, the depression affected at least 40 state roads, with fifteen blocked by landslides, and eleven bridges destroyed. Flooding forced the closure of Puerto Rico Highway 2 between Manatí and Barceloneta. The depression left more than $40 million (1970 USD$, 318 million 2026 USD) in crop damage, primarily to sugarcane and coffee, as reported by William R. Poage, the chair of the House Agricultural Committee. Throughout Puerto Rico, the depression caused damage estimated at $65 million (1970 USD$, 517 million 2026 USD), as well as at least 18 confirmed fatalities. A report six months after the depression indicated there were 34 people missing, although their status is unknown.
- September 15–16, 1975 – Tropical Storm Eloise, caused floods that resulted in more than 40 deaths.
- July 17–18, 1979 – Tropical Storm Claudette made landfall in Puerto Rico as a tropical depression.
- August 30, 1979 – Hurricane David, passed near the southern coast, bringing with it a large amount of rains that caused floods throughout the island.
- September 4, 1979 – Hurricane Frederic made landfall in Puerto Rico as a tropical storm, crossing from Fajardo to Cabo Rojo, repeating these. Between it and David, seven deaths were recorded.
- September 8, 1981 – Hurricane Gert made landfall in Puerto Rico as a tropical storm.
- 1984, November 7, 1984 – Hurricane Klaus made landfall as a tropical storm in Puerto Rico.
- September 18, 1989 – Hurricane Hugo was a major hurricane which made landfall in the northeastern tip of Puerto Rico. Initially expected to directly affect the entirety of Puerto Rico, an unexpected turn made it strike Vieques and only pass near the main island. Despite this, the winds caused two deaths, infrastructure damage that ascended to $890 million and included a dam failure, and caused fauna losses that threatened the already vulnerable Puerto Rican Amazon.
- October 8, 1990 – Hurricane Klaus
- August 15, 1993 – Tropical Storm Cindy
- September 11, 1994 – Tropical Storm Debby
- September 5–6, 1995 – Hurricane Luis
- September 15–16, 1995 – Hurricane Marilyn
- October 25, 1995 – Tropical Storm Sebastien
- July 8, 1996 – Hurricane Bertha
- September 9–10, 1996 – Hurricane Hortense made landfall in the southwestern tip of Puerto Rico. It's slow movement allowed the system, which was expected to pass south of Puerto Rico as a tropical storm, to gather strength and become a hurricane. Ultimately, it made landfall at Peñuelas and exited at Mayagüez. The floods that it brought took rivers off course and caused 18 deaths.
- October 16, 1997 – Tropical Storm Grace
- September 21–22, 1998 – Hurricane Georges made landfall and crossed Puerto Rico from east to west entering trough Yabucoa/Humacao, hitting the Cordillera Central and redirecting itself to Mayagüez. The storm killed 10, caused the collapse of the electric grid, destroyed the agricultural infrastructure, destroyed roads/bridges with and caused damages that were estimated at four billion dollars.
- October 21, 1999 – Hurricane Jose
- November 17, 1999 – Hurricane Lenny This storm was irregular, both in the month in which it entered the eastern Caribbean and its trajectory, causing minor damages during a its voyage south of the island.

=== 21st century ===
- August 22, 2000 – Hurricane Debby
- September 16–17, 2000 – Tropical Storm Helene
- August 22, 2001 – Tropical Storm Dean
- August 21–22, 2003 – Tropical Depression Nine
- October 10, 2003 – Tropical Storm Mindy
- December 4–7, 2003 – Tropical Storm Odette made landfall in Hispaniola but still brought somewhat heavy rain to Puerto Rico, peaking at 8.73 in (222 mm) in Jájome Alto. A total of $20,000 (2003 USD) in damage was reported from three bridge collapses, and a landslide occurred in Humacao.

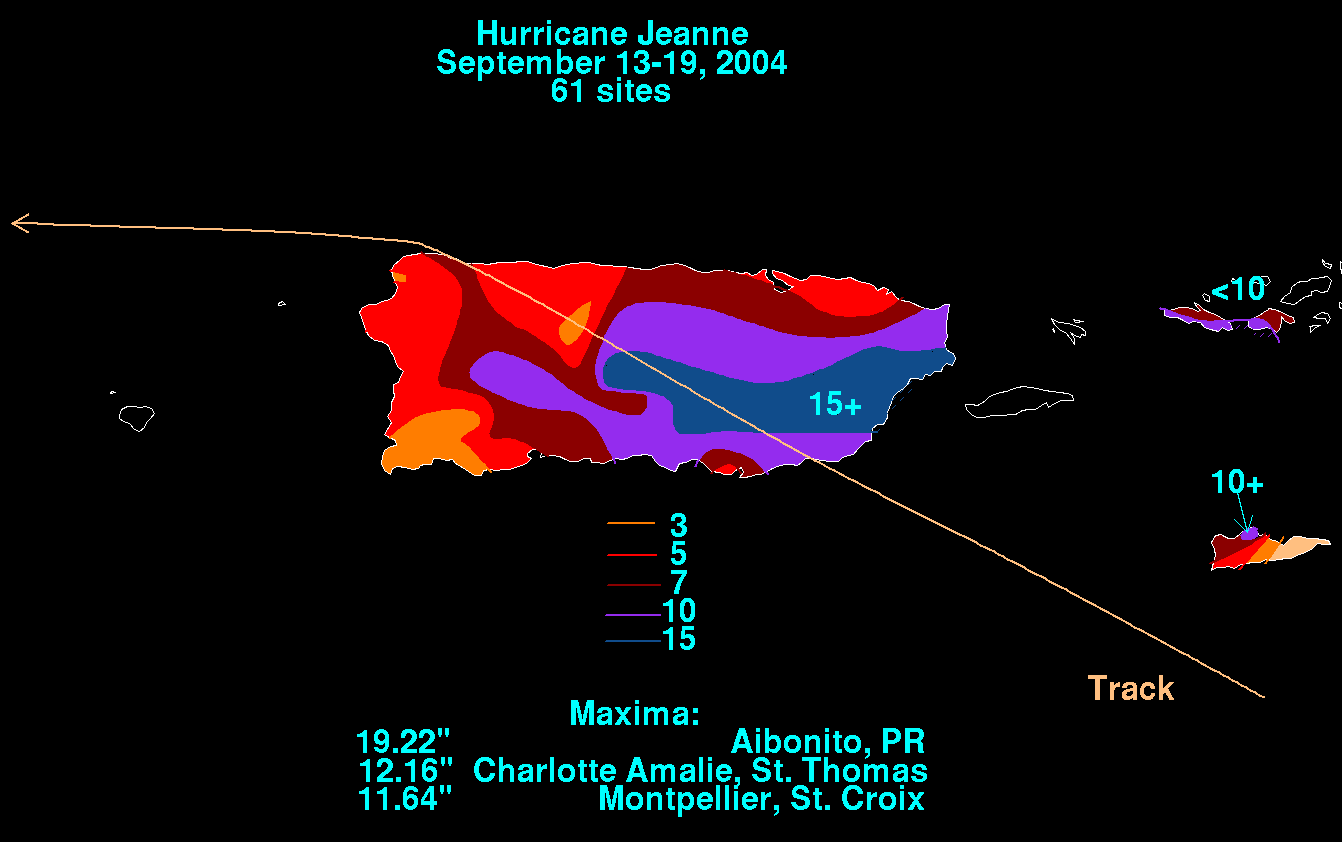
Map of rainfall from Hurricane Jeanne in Puerto Rico

- September 15, 2004 – Hurricane Jeanne made landfall near Maunabo, Puerto Rico as a strong tropical storm, midday on September 15 with sustained winds of 70 mph (110 km/h) and heavy rain. A total of 19.22 in (488 mm) of rain fell in Aibonito, with 15 in (380 mm) of that coming in a 24-hour period; the 24-hour total corresponds to a greater than 100-year rain event. Another greater than 100-year rain event occurred on the island of Vieques, with 14.75 in (375 mm) falling in a 24-hour timeframe. About 50% of people in the territory were without running water by three days after the storm, and 70% were without electricity due to a large scale outage product of preventive measures to protect the electrical grid. A total of eight people (four directly killed by the storm and four indirectly) were reported dead in Puerto Rico as a result of Jeanne, and damages from the storm were estimated at $169.5 million (2004 USD).
- August 1–4, 2006 – Tropical Storm Chris brought light rainfall to Puerto Rico, which peaked at 3.30 in (84 mm) in Aceitunas. The Fajardo River overflowed its banks, causing a highway to close in the northeast coast of the territory.
- August 25–27, 2006 – Hurricane Ernesto produced rain across two days in Puerto Rico, peaking at 4.69 in (119 mm) in Sabana Grande.
- August 18, 2007 – Hurricane Dean brought rain and heavy surf to Puerto Rico, closing down several roads while passing to the south of the territory. $15,000 in damage was estimated as a result of the storm.
- October 26, 2007 – Hurricane Noel straddled the eastern part of Puerto Rico and made landfall in the island municipalities of Culebra and Vieques as an extratropical depression. In response to high water levels, officials opened dam gates along the Río de la Plata and the Río Carraízo.
- December 10–12, 2007 – Tropical Storm Olga made landfall as a subtropical storm in north-central Puerto Rico, producing light to moderate rains in the island. The highest total recorded was 11.13 in (283 mm) of rain near Ponce. A river gage sensor reported the Río Grande de Arecibo at several feet above flood stage. Due to the storm, 79,000 people lost power, and 144,000 people lost access to water; as well, a landslide buried an SUV and killed one person.
- August 31–September 4, 2008 – Despite at its closest approach being nearly 350 mi (560 km) away, Hurricane Hanna produced torrential rainfall in Puerto Rico, with 10–12 in (250–300 mm) of rain falling in 24 hours in parts of the territory. A maximum total of 16.19 in (411 mm) of rain from the entire duration of the storm was recorded outside Adjuntas. Many rivers flooded their banks and many landslides were reported as a result of Hanna.

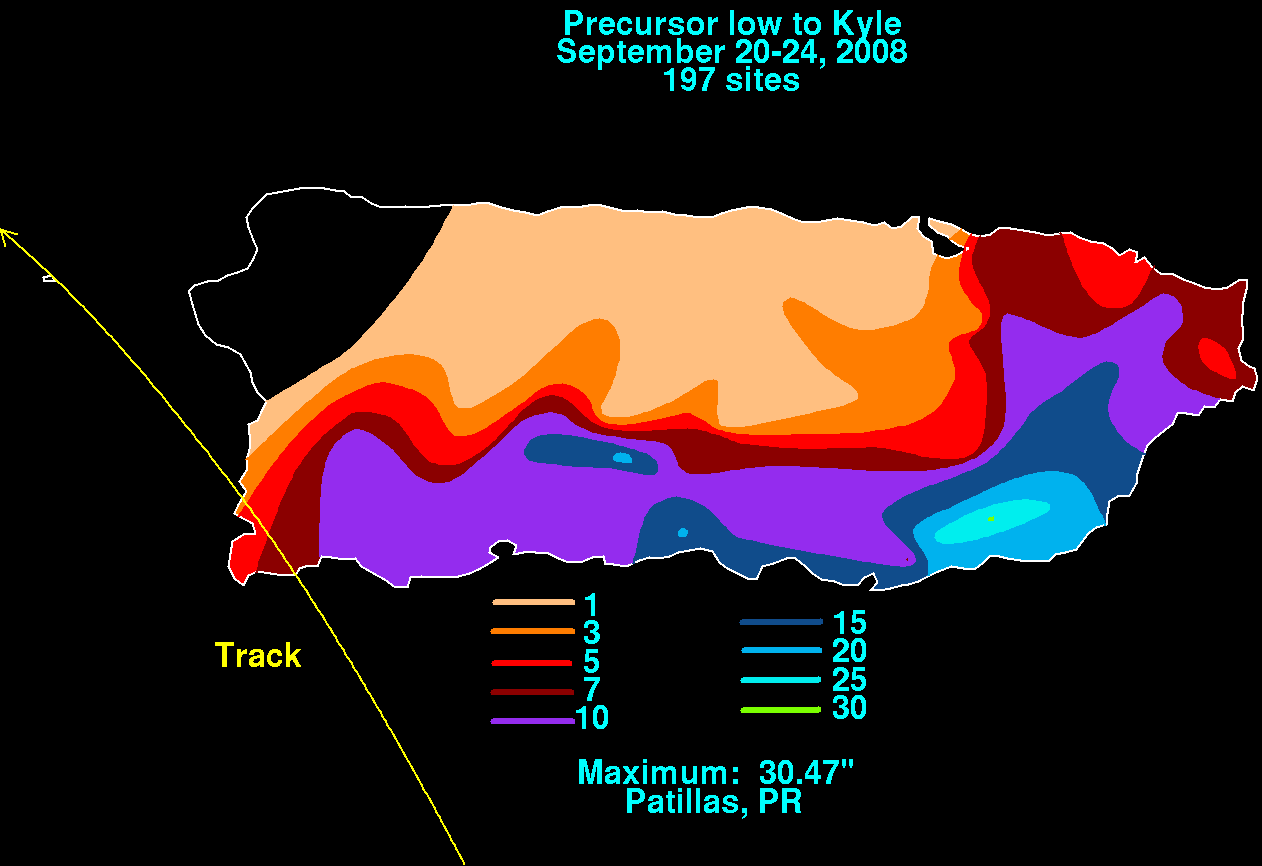
Rainfall from the precursor low to Hurricane Kyle in 2008 across Puerto Rico

- September 20–24, 2008 – The precursor low to Hurricane Kyle produced record-breaking rainfall in parts of Puerto Rico, reaching totals as high as 30.47 in (774 mm) in Patillas. Patillas also recorded a 500-year flood event, receiving 22.03 in (560 mm) of rain in 24 hours from 8 a.m. on September 21 to 8 a.m. on September 22. The Rio Gurabo and other rivers rose over 25 ft (7.6 m) in 12 hours. Flash floods and mudslides killed three people, while three others died indirectly due to heart attacks. Damages in Puerto Rico were recorded at $48 million (2008 USD), with $25 million of that being structural and $23 million being agricultural.
- October 13–16, 2008 – Hurricane Omar brought moderate to heavy rainfall along with gusty winds that caused flash flooding, though no damage was reported. One person died after suffering a heart attack while installing storm shutters on their house.
- August 17–18, 2009 – The remnants of Tropical Storm Ana produced minor rainfall in Puerto Rico, with a maximum total of 2.76 in (70 mm) of rain in Río Grande. Wind gusts as high as 42 mph (68 km/h) were recorded in the territory. Three schools were evacuated and roughly 6,000 people lost power as a result of the storm.
- September 3–5, 2009 – Tropical Depression Erika and its remnants brought heavy rains to parts of Puerto Rico, causing flooding. A maximum total of 7.92 in (201 mm) of rain fell in Naguabo, while many other parts of the territory saw at least 4 in (100 mm) of rain. Three rivers overflowed their banks, with the Loíza River reaching 29.27 ft (8.92 m), 7.27 ft (2.22 m) above flood stage. A total of $35 thousand (2009 USD) in damage was estimated as a result of the storm.
- July 18, 2010 – The precursor to Tropical Storm Bonnie caused flooding across Puerto Rico, leading to one person drowning in a swollen river.
- August 29–September 4, 2010 – Hurricane Earl passed north of Puerto Rico as a Category 4 hurricane, producing heavy rains in parts of the island. A maximum total of 5.19 in (132 mm) of rain fell near Naguabo. Nearly 187,000 people were left without power due to Earl, and 60,000 more were left without water in the territory.
- September 6–7, 2010 – The remnants of Tropical Storm Gaston produced minor rainfall in Puerto Rico, with a peak of 3.03 in (77 mm) in Naguabo.
- September 17, 2010 – One person drowned as a result of rough surf produced by Hurricane Igor.
- October 2–8, 2010 – The precursor to Hurricane Otto brought rain to Puerto Rico across a six-day period, peaking at 17.86 in (454 mm) in Ponce. The municipality of Utuado was isolated outside of the PR-10 highway as a result of the storm. More than 40 roads were closed as a result of the storm, and 295 roads were affected in some way from the storm. In total, $6.5 million (2010 USD) was estimated in damage to the road system. An additional $1.5 million was estimated to agriculture in Ponce. At least 134 people had to take refuge from the storm, while an estimated 45,000 people lost access to drinking water. The government of Puerto Rico declared a state of emergency for the entire island during the storm.
- August 1–4, 2011 – Tropical Storm Emily brought tropical storm conditions to many parts of the territory. A total of 8.22 in (209 mm) of rain was recorded in Caguas, and across the territory three rivers overflowed, leading to the PR-31 highway being impassable for a few hours. $5 million (2011 USD) in damage was estimated in Puerto Rico.

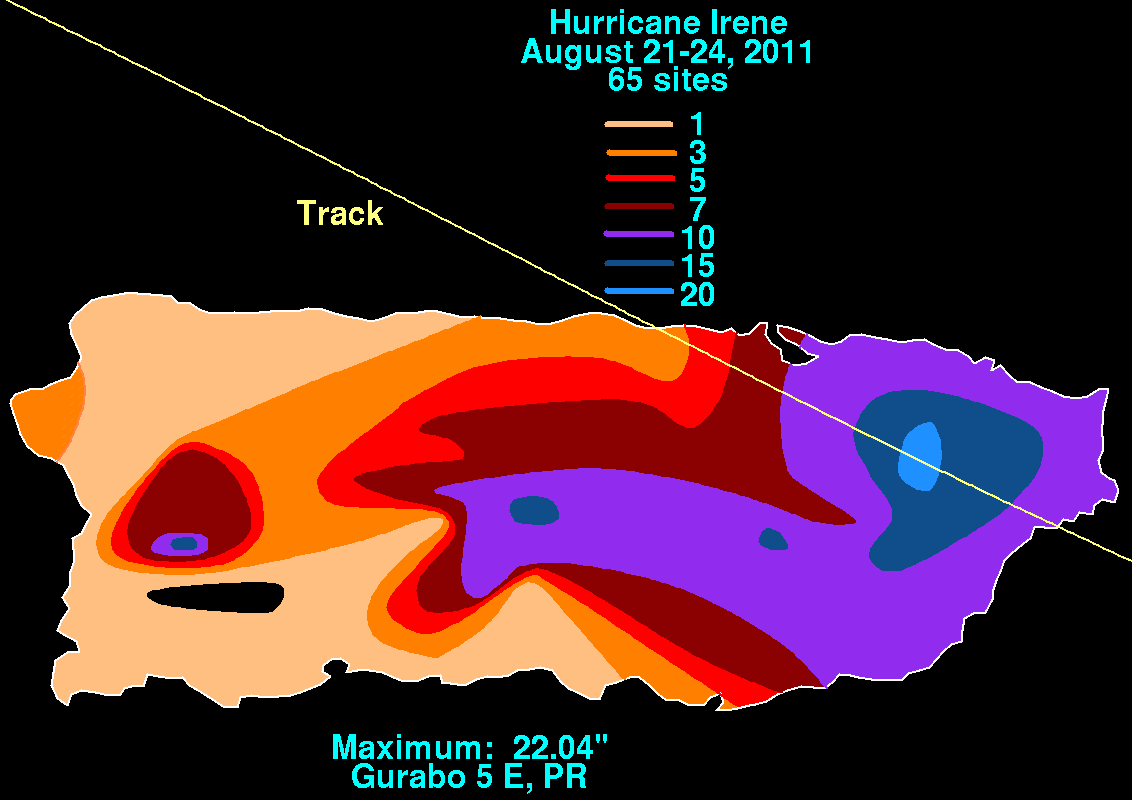
Rainfall from Hurricane Irene in Puerto Rico

- August 21–24, 2011 – Hurricane Irene made landfall very shortly after it strengthened from a tropical storm to a Category 1 hurricane and crossed the island from the southeast to the north. A maximum of 22.04 in (560 mm) of rain was recorded in Gurabo, while large swaths of the eastern side of the main island received at least 7 in (180 mm) of rain. Over 1 million people lost power as a result of Irene, while 121,000 people lost access to water. At least 1,446 people had to either be placed in shelter or be evacuated due to the storm. One person died after their car was swept away, and a preliminary estimate indicated $500 million of damage in Puerto Rico. A state of emergency for the territory was declared by president Barack Obama.
- September 11–14, 2011 – Hurricane Maria passed to the northeast of Puerto Rico as a tropical storm, causing $1.3 million in damages. In Yabucoa, flooding damaged about 150 homes; Yabucoa was also the location of the highest rainfall total recorded during the storm, at 11.04 in (280 mm). About a month after the storm, president Barack Obama announced that federal disaster aid would be available to the territory.
- August 4, 2012 – Hurricane Ernesto dropped locally heavy rain in areas, despite passing well south of the island as a tropical storm.8.39 in (213 mm) of rain was recorded in Jayuya, the most recorded in connection to the storm. Mudslides and flooded roads stranded at least 3 cars.
- August 23–24, 2012 – Hurricane Isaac passed south of Puerto Rico as a tropical storm, causing about $3,000 (2012 USD) in damage. A 75-year-old woman fell from a second-floor balcony and died while preparing for the storm.
- July 9–10, 2013 – Tropical Storm Chantal caused wind gusts of up to 50 mph (80 km/h) in Puerto Rico. Multiple power lines fell down across the territory and a landslide closed 2 lanes of PR-948.
- September 4–5, 2013 – Tropical Storm Gabrielle produced 6 to 8 inches (150 to 200 mm) of rain in Puerto Rico while passing nearby as a tropical depression.
- August 2–3, 2014 – While passing to the southwest of Puerto Rico as a tropical storm, Hurricane Bertha dropped a general 3–5 inches (76–127 mm) of rain across the territory, with up to 11.11 in (282 mm) of rain recorded in Adjuntas. The rain helped with drought conditions in parts of the territory. Prolific lightning from Bertha caused the majority of the 29,000 power outages recorded in the wake of the storm.
- August 22–24, 2014 – The wave that would later become Hurricane Cristobal passed over Puerto Rico, producing torrential rains, with a peak of 13.21 in (336 mm) of rain recorded near Tibes. Several other areas in Puerto Rico, mostly near Ponce, received at least 10 in (250 mm) of rain. Multiple landslides happened as a result of the rains, 17,000 people lost power, and 7,000 people lost access to clean drinking water. The monetary damage produced by the storm is unknown.
- October 14–15, 2014 – Hurricane Gonzalo caused power outages in Puerto Rico, but no major damage. Twenty people were forced to stay in an emergency shelter.
- August 25, 2015 – The remnants of Hurricane Danny brought minor rainfall to Puerto Rico. The rains helped alleviate a drought in the territory, raising dam levels that were critically low.
- August 27–28, 2015 – Tropical Storm Erika travelled just south of Puerto Rico, bringing needed rain to the drought-stricken territory, which peaked at 4.45 in (113 mm) in Adjuntas. Approximately 250,000 people were left without electricity, 36 homes sustained roof damage, and $17.37 million (2015 USD) in damage was caused to agriculture in the territory.
- September 5–7, 2017 – Hurricane Irma passed north of Puerto Rico as a Category 5 hurricane, producing tropical storm force winds across much of the main island. A peak wind gust of 111 mph (179 km/h) was recorded on the island of Culebra. The only telecommunications tower on Culebra was damaged, cutting off communications completely for several hours. At least 30 houses were destroyed there, and an additional 30 were damaged. A peak rainfall amount was recorded in Bayamón of 13.04 in (331 mm). Across the territory, at least 362,000 people lost access to water services, and approximately 1.1 million of the Puerto Rico Electric Power Authority's 1.5 million customers lost power. In all, $1 billion (2017 USD) in damage was brought by the storm, and the NHC attributed three fatalities to Irma in Puerto Rico, though four deaths were related to the storm
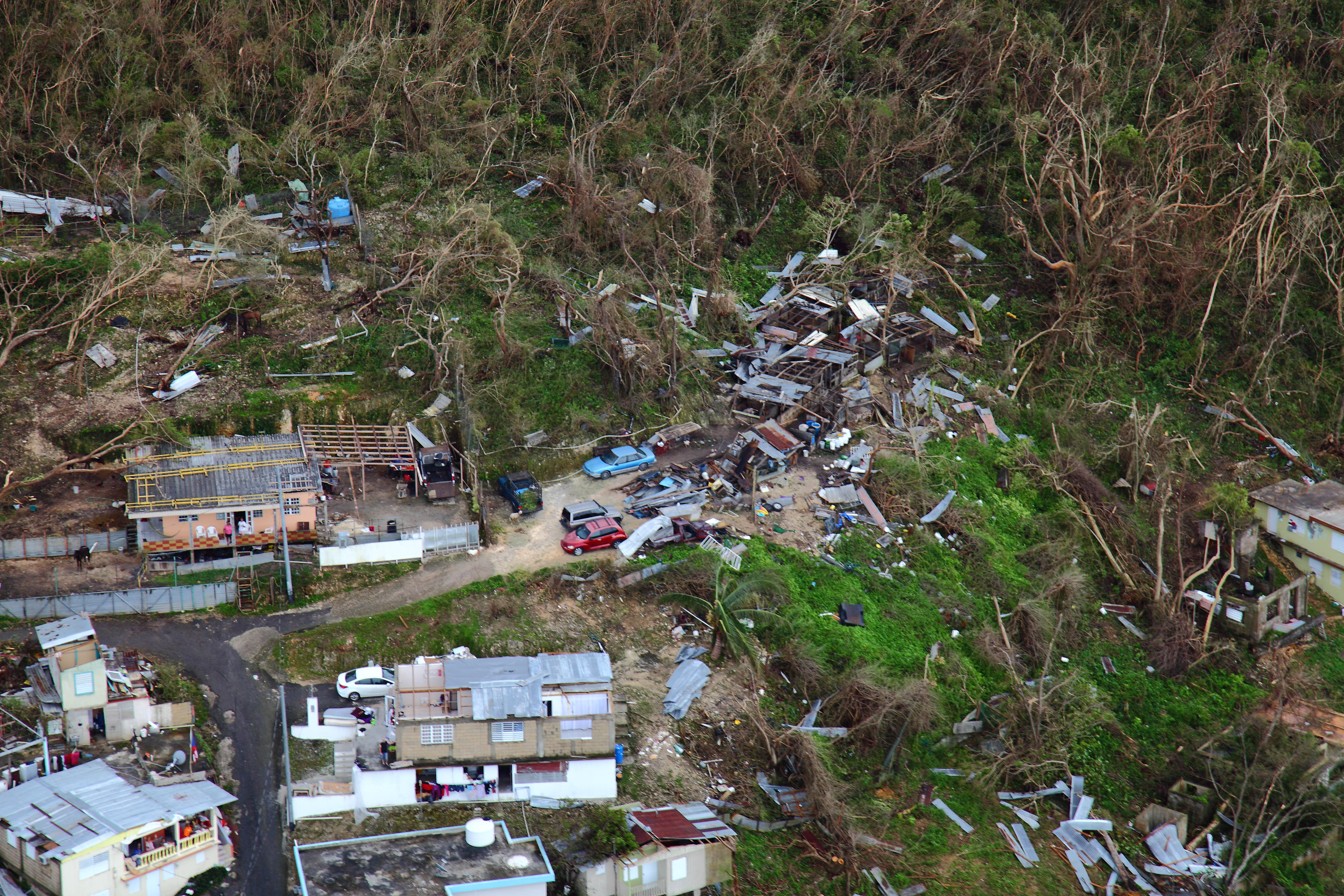
  Damage from Hurricane Maria in Puerto Rico
- September 19–21, 2017 – Hurricane Maria made landfall on Puerto Rico as a high-end Category 4 hurricane, causing catastrophic damage to the territory. Rain totals as high as 37.9 in (960 mm) were reported, with that peak value coming in Caguas. High storm surge and heavy rain caused significant flooding, with water levels being as deep as 15 ft (4.6 m). The entire power grid on the island was destroyed by the storm, and 95% of cell networks on the island were down. Five days after the hurricane, 95% of the island still had no power, 95% of the island had no cell service and 44% had no tap water. By three months after the hurricane, 45% of power customers had yet to get power back, and 14% still had no tap water, though 90% of the island did have cell service by this point. Maria ultimately caused an estimated 2,975 deaths on the island, becoming the deadliest hurricane to hit Puerto Rico since the 1899 San Ciriaco hurricane. Governor of Puerto Rico Ricardo Rosselló estimated damages from the storm at $90 billion (2017 USD).
- July 9–10, 2018 – The remnants of Hurricane Beryl passed south of Puerto Rico, bringing heavy rain, especially to the east side of the main island; some areas on the east side of the island received over 8 inches of rain. More than 47,000 people lost power as a result of the storm, but no deaths or injuries were reported.
- August 28–29, 2019 – Hurricane Dorian passed east of Puerto Rico, causing gusty winds and heavy rain. One person died while preparing for the storm.
- September 23–25, 2019 – Tropical Storm Karen made landfall in the east coast of Puerto Rico, causing flooding and displacing 217 people. No major damage occurred as a result of the storm.
- July 29–30, 2020 – Hurricane Isaias passed south of Puerto Rico as a tropical storm, bringing flooding to the territory. One person died as a result, and US$59.5 million in damage is estimated from the storm.
- August 22–23, 2020 – Hurricane Laura passed just south of Puerto Rico as a tropical storm, causing 200,000 people to lose power and 14,000 people to lose access to running water. Up to 5.82 inches (148 mm) of rain fell in central and southeast Puerto Rico.
- September 18, 2020 – Hurricane Teddy caused swells on the Puerto Rico coast, killing two people.
- September 17–19, 2022 – Hurricane Fiona made landfall in Lajas, Puerto Rico as a slow-moving Category 1 hurricane that brought heavy rains over the whole island. At least 21 deaths were attributed to the storm.
- November 4–6, 2022 – Hurricane Nicole reached the island as a tropical disturbance. 4–8 inches (100–200 mm) of rainfall occurred without any fatalities.

== See also ==
- List of Puerto Rico hurricanes (2000–present)
- Hurricanes in Hispaniola
- List of Cuba hurricanes

== Bibliography ==
- Abbad y Lasierra, Fray Íñigo (1866), de Acosta y Calbo, José Julián (ed.), Historia geográfica, civil y natural de la Isla de San Juan Bautista de Puerto-Rico (in Spanish) (nueva ed.), Puerto Rico: Imprenta y Libreria de Acosta, p. 433, OCLC 51898961
- Alexander, William H. (1902), Hurricanes: especially those of Porto Rico and St. Kitts., Bulletin, United States Department of Agriculture, Weather Bureau, p. 79
- Caldera Ortiz, Luis (2014). La historia de los ciclones y huracanes tropicales en Puerto Rico. Editorial Akelarre. ISBN 1497535484.
- Hughes, Patrick (1987), "Hurricanes haunt our history", Weatherwise, 40 (3): 134–140, Bibcode:1987Weawi..40c.134H, doi:10.1080/00431672.1987.9933354
- Millás, José Carlos (1968), Pardue, Leonard (ed.), Hurricanes of the Caribbean and Adjacent Regions, 1492–1800, Miami: Academy of the Arts and Sciences of the Americas, OCLC 339427
- Pérez, Orlando, ed. (1971), Notes on the tropical cyclones of Puerto Rico, 1508–1970
- Salivia, Luis Alfredo (1972), Historia de los temporales de Puerto Rico y las Antillas, 1492 a 1970 (in Spanish) (2a. rev. y aum. ed.), San Juan, Puerto Rico: Editorial Edil, p. 385, OCLC 433147145
