= List of shipwrecks in July 1825 =

The list of shipwrecks in July 1825 includes some ships sunk, wrecked or otherwise lost during July 1825.

== 1 July ==
List of shipwrecks: 1 July 1825
Ship	State	Description
Dorothea	(United Kingdom of Great Britain and Ireland) Guernsey	The ship was run down and sunk in the North Sea off Vlissingen, Zeeland, Netherlands with the loss of all but two of her crew. She was on a voyage from Newcastle upon Tyne, Northumberland to Antwerp, Netherlands.
Henry	United Kingdom	The schooner was lost on the coast of Africa.

== 3 July ==
List of shipwrecks: 3 July 1825
Ship	State	Description
Jane	United Kingdom	The ship sprang a leak and was abandoned in the Gulf of Mexico. Her crew were rescued by Brutus (United States). Jane was on a voyage from New Orleans, Louisiana, United States to Liverpool, Lancashire.

== 4 July ==
List of shipwrecks: 4 July 1825
Ship	State	Description
Eliza & Mary	United States	The ship was driven ashore on Bodie Island, North Carolina with only one person on board. She was on a voyage from Baltimore, Maryland to St. Domingo.

== 5 July ==
List of shipwrecks: 5 July 1825
Ship	State	Description
Ann	United Kingdom	The ship was driven ashore crewless on the coast of County Donegal. She was on a voyage from Saint John, New Brunswick, British North America to Wexford. Ann was refloated and taken in to port.

== 7 July ==
List of shipwrecks: 7 July 1825
Ship	State	Description
Gratitude	United Kingdom	The schooner was wrecked on the Stage Rocks, in the English Channel off The Lizard, Cornwall with the loss of two lives.

== 8 July ==
List of shipwrecks: 8 July 1825
Ship	State	Description
Cadiz Packet	Spain	The galiot was wrecked on the Goodwin Sands, Kent, United Kingdom All on board were rescued. She was on a voyage from Ostend, West Flanders, Netherlands to Cádiz.

== 10 July ==
List of shipwrecks: 10 July 1825
Ship	State	Description
Kingston	(United Kingdom of Great Britain and Ireland) Jamaica	The ship departed from Jamaica for Bermuda. No further trace, presumed foundered with the loss of all hands.
Valetta	United Kingdom	The ship struck a reef off Cape Hillsborough. She was refloated the next day, but sprang a leak on 23 July in the Whitsunday Passage and was beached the next day at Cape Gloucester, New Britain, where she was declared a total loss. All 57 people on board survived.

== 11 July ==
List of shipwrecks: 11 July 1825
Ship	State	Description
Amelia	United States	The ship departed from Gibraltar for New York. No further trace, presumed foundered in the Atlantic Ocean with the loss of all hands.

== 12 July ==
List of shipwrecks: 12 July 1825
Ship	State	Description
Gipsey	United Kingdom	The ship was wrecked on the West Hoyle Bank, in Liverpool Bay. All on board were rescued. She was on a voyage from Newry, County Antrim to Liverpool, Lancashire.

== 14 July ==
List of shipwrecks: 14 July 1825
Ship	State	Description
Barbara & Catharine	United Kingdom	The ship was wrecked on a reef off the Isle of Skye, Outer Hebrides. Her crew were rescued. She was on a voyage from Liverpool, Lancashire to Staxigoe, Caithness.

== 16 July ==
List of shipwrecks: 16 July 1825
Ship	State	Description
Fame	United Kingdom	The ship was driven ashore and wrecked at the mouth of the Daugava. Her crew were rescued. She was on a voyage from Hull, Yorkshire to Riga, Russia.
Kate	United Kingdom	The ship ran aground in the River Tyne and was damaged. She was refloated and taken in to North Shields, County Durham for repairs.

== 17 July ==
List of shipwrecks: 17 July 1825
Ship	State	Description
Apropos	Flag unknown	The ship was driven ashore and wrecked near Riga, Russia. Her crew were rescued. She was on a voyage from Riga to Karlskrona, Sweden.

== 18 July ==
List of shipwrecks: 18 July 1825
Ship	State	Description
Lord Wellington	United Kingdom	The ship was abandoned in the Atlantic Ocean. Her crew were rescued by Nottingham (United Kingdom). Lord Wellington was on a voyage from Quebec City, Lower Canada, British North America to Hull, Yorkshire.

== 19 July ==
List of shipwrecks: 19 July 1825
Ship	State	Description
Belinda	United Kingdom	The sealer was driven ashore and wrecked on Middle Island, New Holland. Her crew were rescued.
Providence	United Kingdom	The ship was holed by her anchor at Gibraltar and sank.

== 20 July ==
List of shipwrecks: 20 July 1825
Ship	State	Description
Good Agreement	United Kingdom	The ship was holed by her anchor at Hull, Yorkshire and was beached.

== 22 July ==
List of shipwrecks: 22 July 1825
Ship	State	Description
Lotus	British East India Company	The transport ship ran aground at the mouth of the Hooghly River, India. She capsized the next day and was wrecked with the loss of 61 of the 105 people on board. Lotus was on a voyage from Rangoon, Burma to Calcutta
Neptunus	United Kingdom of the Netherlands	The ship struck the pier and sank at Quillebeuf-sur-Seine, Eure. Her crew were rescued. She was on a voyage from Newcastle upon Tyne, Northumberland, United Kingdom to Quillebeur-sur-Seine.
Sally	United Kingdom	The ship was destroyed by fire at Riga, Russia.

== 26 July ==
List of shipwrecks: 26 July 1825
Ship	State	Description
Anne	(United Kingdom of Great Britain and Ireland) Tortola	The drogher was driven ashore and wrecked in a hurricane at Saint John, Virgin Islands.
Beautiful Maid	(United Kingdom of Great Britain and Ireland) Barbados	The sloop was driven ashore in a hurricane at Barbados.
Canarles	France	The ship was wrecked in a hurricane at Guadeloupe.
Constantia	Denmark	The ship was driven ashore in a hurricane at Saint Croix, Virgin Islands. She was later refloated.
Deux Amis	France	The ship was wrecked in a hurricane at Guadaloup.
Devotion	Denmark	The ship was driven ashore in a hurricane at Saint Croix. She was refloated on 14 August.
Genius	Duchy of Holstein	The ship was driven ashore in a hurricane at Saint Croix. She was later refloated.
Grant	Denmark	The ship was driven ashore in a hurricane at Saint Croix. She was later refloated.
Mount Vernon	United States	The ship was wrecked on the Guyama Reef.
Pilgrim	(United Kingdom of Great Britain and Ireland) Saint Kitts	The ship was driven ashore in a hurricane at Sandy Point, Saint Kitts.
Rambler	United States	The brigantine was driven ashore and wrecked in a hurricane at Barbados.
Regent	United Kingdom	The ship ran aground at Miramichi, New Brunswick, British North America.
Saint Croix	Duchy of Holstein	The ship was driven ashore in a hurricane at Saint Croix. She was refloated the next day.
Saint Vincent Planter	United Kingdom	The ship was driven ashore in a hurricane at Nevis. She was later refloated and taken in to Saint Croix in a severely damaged condition.
Sir William Congreve	United Kingdom	The brig was wrecked in a hurricane at "St. John's", Puerto Rico.
Swallow	United Kingdom	The ship was driven ashore and wrecked in a hurricane at Montserrat.
Tideselholdt	Duchy of Holstein	The ship was driven ashore and damaged in a hurricane at Saint Croix. She had been refloated by 15 August and was then under repair.
Trial	United Kingdom	The ship was driven ashore and wrecked in a hurricane in Prince Rupert's Bay, Dominica. Her crew were rescued. She was on a voyage from London to New Providence, Bahamas. Trial was later refloated.
Valiant	United Kingdom	The ship was driven ashore and wrecked in a hurricane at Prince Rupert's Bay.

== 27 July ==
List of shipwrecks: 27 July 1825
Ship	State	Description
Alonzo	United States	The ship foundered in the Atlantic Ocean with the loss of four of her crew. She was on a voyage from New Orleans, Louisiana to Jamaica.
Emma	United Kingdom	The ship departed from Port-au-Prince, Haiti for London. No further trace, presumed foundered with the loss of all hands.
H. G. Seymour	United States	The schooner was wrecked on Saint Domingo.
Jack Tar	United Kingdom	The ship departed from Jamaica for London on or about this date. No further trace, presumed foundered with the oss of all hands.
Victory	United States	The ship foundered off the Turks Islands in a hurricane with the loss of all hands. She was on a voyage from Philadelphia, Pennsylvania to Jamaica.

== 29 July ==
List of shipwrecks: 29 July 1825
Ship	State	Description
Adventurer	United Kingdom	The schooner was wrecked in the Crozet Islands. Her fifteen crew survived. They were rescued on 6 January 1827 by Cape Packet ( (United Kingdom of Great Britain and Ireland) Cape Colony).
Fame	United Kingdom	The ship was driven ashore and wrecked near Riga, Russia.
Lotus	United Kingdom	The ship was lost off "Saugur". She was on a voyage from Rangoon to Calcutta, India.

== 30 July ==
List of shipwrecks: 30 July 1825
Ship	State	Description
Victory	United States	The brig was driven ashore in a capsized state in the Caicos Islands. She was on a voyage from Philadelphia, Pennsylvania to Jamaica.

== 31 July ==
List of shipwrecks: 31 July 1825
Ship	State	Description
Providence	Brazil	The ship was wrecked on the Corva Grand Bank, in the Atlantic Ocean off the coast of Brazil with the loss of 30 of the 42 people on board. She was on a voyage from Rio de Janeiro to Maranhão.
Three Gebroeders	Netherlands	The ship departed from Surinam for Amsterdam, North Holland. No further trace, presumed foundered with the loss of all hands.

== Unknown date ==
List of shipwrecks: Unknown date in July 1825
Ship	State	Description
Aventure	France	The ship was wrecked on an islet in the Antarctic. The crew made it to the islet. The Captain tied messages around the neck of baby albatrosses hoping they might fly to a ship. One was caught by the Whaler Cape Packet (United Kingdom) and they rescued the crew 6 January 1827.
Christiana	United States	The schooner was abandoned in the Atlantic Ocean on or before 27 July.
Dragon	United Kingdom	The ship was abandoned in the Atlantic Ocean in late July. All on board were rescued by HMS Phaeton (Royal Navy). Dragon was on a voyage from Demerara to Bermuda.
Neptune	United States	The ship capsized off Bornholm, Denmark on or before 27 July.
