= Recovery (1821 ship) =

British opium ship

History

United Kingdom
- Name: Recovery
- Builder: J. Thomas, Howrah, Calcutta, India
- Launched: 30 October 1821
- Renamed: Valetta
- Fate: Wrecked July 1825

General characteristics
- Tons burthen: 317 (bm)
- Notes: Teak-built

Recovery was launched at Howrah, Calcutta, in 1821. At some point she was renamed Valetta (or Valletta). She was wrecked in July 1825, while sailing from Sydney to Manila.

== Career ==
In 1823, Valetta was one of five or six British opium ships at Macao or outside the Pearl River, the Chinese government having forbidden them to enter with their cargoes of opium. On 28 March 1824, she was again at the anchorage at Lintin, with opium.

The East-India register and directory for 1824 showed her registered at Calcutta and gave her master's name as J.W.Phillips.

Loss: Lloyd's List reported on 14 April 1826, based on a letter from Sydney dated 21 September, that the country ship Valetta, Phillips, master, had wrecked on 10 July 1825, on the coast of New South Wales, but that her crew and most of the materials had been saved. (Note: There is some ambiguity in the name of her master.)

On 13 June 1825, Valetta, Dacre, master, sailed from Sydney, bound for Manila. On 9 July, she anchored off an island near Cape Hillsborough. The next day she weighed, but before she could raise her anchor, the wind shifted and drove her on some rocks. She beat heavily during the night and the next day her crew landed her provisions to lighten her. During the night of the 11th, she floated off. She had water in her lower hold. Her crew anchored her in 25 fathoms of water and set to work with the pumps. They were able to pump her dry, but she continued to leak and one pump had to be kept in service.

Her crew repaired the pintails for her rudder and reloaded her provisions. On 22 July, she set sail again. The next day she anchored at the entrance to the Whitsunday Passage. She began to leak alarmingly and both pumps were put in service. Her crew beached the next day at Cape Gloucester, New Britain. After she had been unloaded again, her crew hove her down. It turned out her keel had been broken in two places, coral was embedded in her hull in two places, and she had sustained other damage. After three weeks Dacres decided that she could not be repaired. He put a deck on the longboat, and together with the second mate and nine seamen, set out for Sydney. They reached Sydney on 9 September.

On 26 September 1825, the Colonial sloop Brisbane sailed to the wreck of Valetta in Torres Strait.

Although Valetta was declared a total loss, all 57 people on board survived.

A source reported that Valetta had been repaired and refloated. However, she was lost in the Pelew Islands in 1826.
