= 1910 San Zacarías hurricane =

Category 2 hurricane in 1910

1910 San Zacarías hurricane (Note: The Puerto Rican tradition of referring to intense hurricanes by the names of Catholic saints being commemorated on the corresponding feast days was among the earliest informal tropical cyclone naming systems, and lasted for centuries prior to the introduction of standardized naming conventions. The 1910 San Zacarías hurricane was the second named San Zacarías, and may be referred to as simply hurricane "San Zacarías II". The first San Zacarías hurricane occurred in 1713.)
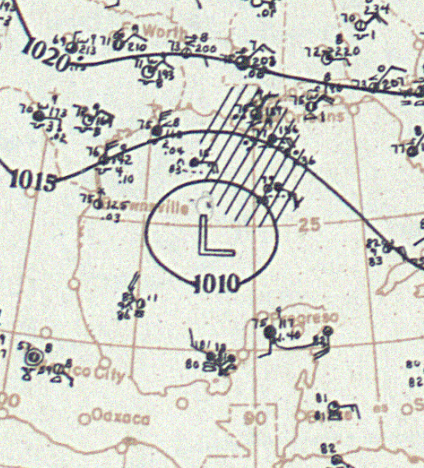
- Surface weather analysis of the hurricane in the Gulf of Mexico on September 13

Meteorological history
- Formed: September 5, 1910 (Note: All times and dates based on Coordinated Universal Time (UTC) unless otherwise noted.)
- Dissipated: September 15, 1910

Category 2 hurricane
- 1-minute sustained (SSHWS/NWS)
- Highest winds: 110 mph (175 km/h)

Overall effects
- Fatalities: 7
- Areas affected: Puerto Rico, Hispaniola, Cuba, Texas, Louisiana
- Part of the 1910 Atlantic hurricane season

The 1910 San Zacarías hurricane was a tropical cyclone that impacted parts of the Greater Antilles and South Texas in September 1910. Reanalyses of the storm estimate that the storm peaked at an intensity equivalent to a Category 2 hurricane on the modern Saffir–Simpson scale, observations along the storm's path were sparse. The tropical cyclone formed east of the Leeward Islands by September 5, but passed near Puerto Rico as a hurricane on the night of September 6–7 with no advance warning. Strong winds and heavy rain produced by a squall or rainband associated with the hurricane impacted the eastern and northern coasts of Puerto Rico, causing extensive damage and setting rainfall intensity records at several weather stations. The maximum rainfall total documented in Puerto Rico was 19.11 in (485 mm) at Naguabo. Three people died after the storm sunk schooners in San Juan Bay.

Tracking west across the Caribbean Sea, the hurricane affected Hispaniola, Cuba, and Jamaica. It moved into the Gulf of Mexico on September 11, where it later reached its peak intensity. On September 14, the hurricane made landfall in South Texas. Gusty winds and rains from the storm spread across the coasts of Texas and Louisiana. The hurricane generated 4–8 in (100–200 mm) of rainfall over South Texas, leading to a flood of the lower Rio Grande that killed four people and caused some damage to crops. The storm weakened inland and dissipated over northeastern Mexico on September 15.

== Meteorological history ==
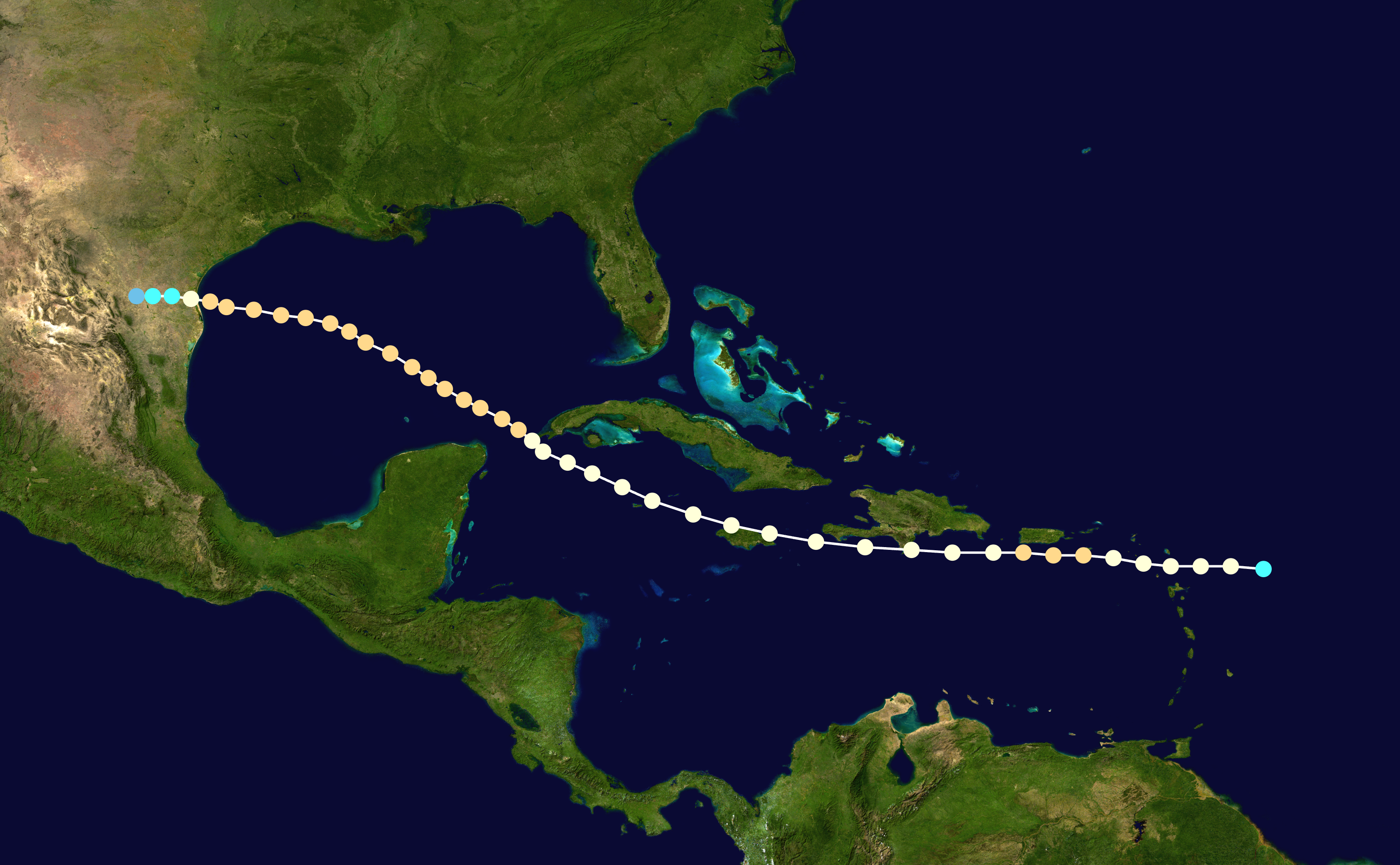
Map plotting the storm's track and intensity, according to the Saffir–Simpson scale Map key Saffir–Simpson scale Tropical depression (≤38 mph, ≤62 km/h) Tropical storm (39–73 mph, 63–118 km/h) Category 1 (74–95 mph, 119–153 km/h) Category 2 (96–110 mph, 154–177 km/h) Category 3 (111–129 mph, 178–208 km/h) Category 4 (130–156 mph, 209–251 km/h) Category 5 (≥157 mph, ≥252 km/h) Unknown Storm type Tropical cyclone Subtropical cyclone Extratropical cyclone, remnant low, tropical disturbance, or monsoon depression

The modern Atlantic hurricane database documents the San Zacarías hurricane as developing east of the Leeward Islands by September 5, 1910, with estimated maximum sustained winds of 70 mph (110 km/h) accompanying the storm's first listed position at 06:00 UTC. The storm intensified into a hurricane the same day and passed over the Leeward Islands, moving near Antigua in the afternoon before moving into the Caribbean Sea. The hurricane passed south of St. Croix on September 6 with estimated sustained winds of 100 mph (155 km/h), equivalent to a Category 2 hurricane on the modern Saffir–Simpson scale. Despite the hurricane intensity, the United States Weather Bureau was only aware of "unsettled" weather over the eastern Caribbean on the morning of September 6, and no warnings were in effect for Puerto Rico when the hurricane tracked south of the U.S. territory on the night of September 6–7. At 23:00 UTC on September 6, the Weather Bureau indicated for the first time that a tropical cyclone was nearby. The center of the hurricane passed 20 mi (32 km) south of Ponce, Puerto Rico, and the barometric pressure at San Juan bottomed out at 1008 mbar (hPa; 29.76 inHg). Tracking west-northwest, the hurricane moved along the southern coast of Hispaniola between September 7–8. It then passed just north of Jamaica on September 9 and continued south of Cuba between September 9–10. The hurricane moved into the Yucatan Channel on September 10. Although the hurricane database lists the storm as remaining a hurricane throughout its trek through the central and western Caribbean, weather researchers Henry F. Diaz and José Fernandez Partagás assessed the tropical cyclone as weakening to tropical storm intensity between September 9–12 before restrengthening based on nearby weather observations and contemporaneous analyses by the Cuban National Observatory.

The storm moved across the Gulf of Mexico between September 11–14. During this period, the hurricane reached its peak intensity with winds of around 110 mph (175 km/h) and held this strength for around two days. Northeast storm warnings were issued for the Texas coast by the Weather Bureau on September 13. At around 22:00 UTC on September 14, the hurricane made landfall on the coast of South Texas near the mouth of the Rio Grande. Contemporaneously, the U.S. Weather Bureau considered the tropical cyclone a strong tropical storm at landfall. However, a reanalysis of the storm conducted by the Atlantic Oceanographic and Meteorological Laboratory in 2011 estimated peak sustained winds of around 105 mph (165 km/h) at the time of landfall, equivalent to a modern-day Category 2 hurricane. No observations were made of the hurricane's central air pressure, though the storm's impacts suggested a minimum pressure of around 965 mbar (hPa; 28.50 inHg) occurring over southern Padre Island. The storm weakened after moving inland over the Rio Grande Valley and dissipated over northeastern Mexico on September 15 near the U.S. border.

== Impact ==
September 6–7 rainfall totals in Puerto Rico
Locality	Rainfall total
Naguabo	19.11 in (485 mm)
Humacao	15.62 in (397 mm)
Río Blanco	14.83 in (377 mm)
Corozal	12.87 in (327 mm)
Comerío Falls	12.80 in (325 mm)
Maunabo	10.68 in (271 mm)
Central Ingénio	10.54 in (268 mm)

Despite passing south of Puerto Rico, a squall or rainband originating from the hurricane caused localized and severe impacts in northeastern Puerto Rico from Fajardo to areas around San Juan and Caguas, producing strong winds and torrential rainfall. The hurricane's impacts were most evident in those areas, with comparatively "normal weather conditions" prevailing across more than two-thirds of Puerto Rico. Considerable damage also occurred along the eastern coast of Puerto Rico between Fajardo and Maunabo. A modeling study published in Ecological Monographs in 2004 suggested that the severity of the hurricane's impacts were approximately equivalent to an F2 on the Fujita scale. The total cost of damage was reported in newspapers to be in the "hundreds of thousands of dollars."

Clear skies were present over San Juan in the early morning of September 6, with no advanced warning of the approaching hurricane and barometers showing no clear indication of an approaching storm; overcast conditions set in by 14:00 UTC and air pressures began to fall more precipitously thereafter. The lack of warning led to criticism of the U.S. Weather Bureau. Thunderstorms affected much of Puerto Rico on the night of September 6–7. The localized impacts in the northern part of Puerto Rico despite the hurricane passing south of the territory gave the erroneous impression that there were two tropical cyclones – named San Zacarías II and San Zacarías III – passing near Puerto Rico, with one striking the northern coastal areas and the other moving harmlessly south of the territory. Strong northeasterly winds buffeted the entirety of Puerto Rico from the late afternoon of September 6 to the early morning hours of September 7, occasionally reaching hurricane-force. At the Weather Bureau office in San Juan, winds peaked at 72 mph (116 km/h) at 23:20 UTC on September 6. Winds were reportedly as strong along the east and northeastern coast of Puerto Rico. The winds toppled and snapped telephone and telegraph poles and wires, disrupting telecommunications in San Juan, Río Piedras, and Santurce. Power outages befell those communities after an electric plant was knocked out of service, cutting them off from the rest of the main Puerto Rico island. The outages in Santurce cut power to the area's trolley service. The winds also uprooted some trees, though fruit trees largely withstood the hurricane. Three people were killed after several schooners sank in San Juan Bay.

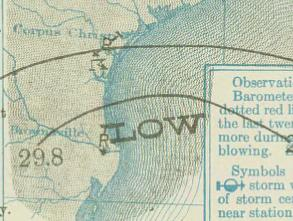
Surface weather analysis of the storm along the Texas coast on September 14

The heavy rains from the hurricane broke intensity records at several weather stations in Puerto Rico. There were two foci for extreme rainfall in Puerto Rico centered on Comerío and Naguabo. Two-day rainfall totals peaked at 19.11 in (485 mm) in Naguabo. In Comerío, a station reported around 13 in (330 mm) of rain in 12 hours. Rainfall totals of around 6–7 ft (1.8–2.1 m) were recorded along the remainder of the northern Puerto Rican coast between San Juan and Fajardo. Most of the damage in the U.S. territory caused by the hurricane was attributed to the rainfall, which led to record river flooding and washed out sugar cane fields. Floodwaters also damaged railroads in the San Juan area.

Heavy property damage was reported in Santo Domingo and Haiti. Effects from the hurricane in Cuba were minor as the storm passed to the south. Heavy rain was reported in Guantanmo without strong attendant winds. The hurricane brought thunderstorms and gusty winds to Jamaica on September 7–9 without significant impact.

The hurricane produced high tides and strong winds throughout the Texas and Louisiana coasts. Storm surge heights from the hurricane reached 9 ft (2.7 m) at South Padre Island. Padre Island was inundated by the surge during landfall and the tide in Nueces Bay reached its highest levels in years. Winds at Corpus Christi, reached 61 mph (98 km/h), but remained light in Brownsville. Wind speeds peaked at 42 mph (68 km/h) in Taylor and 37 mph (60 km/h) in Houston. Heavy rainfall accompanied the hurricane in Texas, with rainfall accumulations reaching 4–8 in (100–200 mm) in Cameron, Hidalgo, Nueces, and Starr counties after 24 hours of continuous rainfall. September 24-hour rainfall records were set in Brighton, La Parra, and Sarita. The heavy rain led to a flood of the lower Rio Grande. The river at Mission rose 17 ft (5.2 m) and reached flood stage on September 19. The swollen river overtopped its banks 4 mi (6.4 km) west of Mission, filling resacas. A 1,800-acre (730 ha) stretch of land spanning 2 mi (3.2 km) wide in Mission was flooded, briefly disrupting rail service and ruining some of the area's bean crop. Northern parts of Mercedes were flooded, with travel by boat necessary to traverse the 3 mi (4.8 km) wide expanse of floodwaters. The floodwaters reached Brownsville four days later, with the Rio Grande rising nearly 15 ft (4.6 m). Four people drowned in the floods near Hidalgo. Damage from the hurricane was minimal farther inland.
