= 2016–17 Southern Thailand floods =

2016-2017 weather event

- Date: December 2016 – January 2017
- Location: southern Thailand, Thailand
- Cause: Monsoons
- Deaths: 96
- Property damage: 120 billion baht (US$4 billion) (By mid-January)

The 2016–17 Southern Thailand floods were a large scale flood disaster that occurred in Southern Thailand from December 2016 to January 2017. It occurred during the country's annual monsoon season and was characterized as being the "worst rainfall in 30 years". The disaster spanned over two consecutive months and covered 13 provinces. These floods stand out from earlier catastrophes due to the massive, long-term damage it caused. There were an estimated 96 fatalities and 1,815,618 people were affected by the disaster.

== Background ==
The floods were brought on by a monsoon coming from the northeast, which transported moisture from the sea to the land and caused persistent heavy rainfall in the region. Due to the overwhelming amount of rain, the drainage systems were unable to release the water into the sea and it flooded nearby areas.

== Flooding timeline ==
By January 1, 2017, up to 25,000 people were forced to evacuate their homes as floods hit parts of the south. According to the Department of Disaster Prevention and Mitigation (DDPM) Deputy Director-General Korpchai Boonorana, 64 districts spanning the provinces of Nakhon Si Thammarat, Trang, Phatthalung, Songkhla, Pattani, Yala, Narathiwat, and Surat Thani were underwater by January 6. Authorities monitored the situation and delivered disaster aid when required. Mre torrential rain felle btween January 16 and 26, 2017.

Rainfall index by time of occurrence
Date range	Rainfall index in province
January 5–6, 2017	Sawi Agromet – 147.6 mm Narathiwat – 151.8 mm
January 4–5, 2017	Nakhon Si Thammarat – 170.5 mm Nakhon Si Thammarat Agromet – 304.8 mm Surat Thani Agromet – 191.5 mm
January 3–4, 2017	Chumphon – 61.3 mm Sawi Agromet – 65.0 mm Nakhon Si Thammarat – 73.7 mm
January 2–3, 2017	Phatthalung Agromet – 142.1 mm Yala Agromet – 112.8 mm
December 31, 2016 to January 1, 2017	Sa-Dao – 84.5 mm Narathiwat – 112.0 mm

=== Flood events ===
January 6, 2017: Nakhon Si Thammarat Airport was closed, and remained closed for 2 days.

January 6, 2017: Surat Thani railway station became the terminal station for the southern railroad.

January 6, 2017: Flooding in Phatthalung caused 3 deaths. 11 districts were affected by the flood. There were landslides in some areas.

January 8, 2017: Continuous rainfall caused a 20 cm-high flood in downtown Krabi.

January 12, 2017: High flood water in many areas caused the trains heading to Trang to stop service.

January 14, 2017: Seven southern provinces were still flooded. Meanwhile, floods had dissipated in five provinces: Yala, Ranong, Narathiwat, Pattani and Krabi.

January 24, 2017: DDPM reported that 96 people had died as a result of the floods and around 1.8 million people from 590,000 families have been affected. The flood waters severely affected 2,336 schools, 70 government buildings, 348 bridges, and 4,314 roadways. By mid-January, approximately 530,000 dwellings had suffered from flash flooding.

January 31, 2017: In the provinces of Nakorn Si Thammarat, Surat Thani, and Phatthalung, only 15,000 households across six districts were still affected by floods, according to DDPM.

== Damage ==
The provinces of Prachuap Khiri Khan, Chumphon, Ranong, Surat Thani, Nakhon Si Thammarat, Krabi, Trang, Phatthalung, Songkhla, Yala, Pattani, and Narathiwat faced damages from flood waters. Landslides and flash floods occurred often in those areas.

By January 17, 2017, 1,135 roads, 5,498 communities in 119 districts, 20 official locations, and 43 recorded fatalities were documented. The death toll increased to 96 by February 2, 2017, according to Thailand's Department of Disaster Prevention and Mitigation (DDPM), in flooding that affected 12 southern provinces in the country from early January. Koh Samui, Khanom, and Pak Panang in the province of Surat Thani were among the economically significant places that were impacted by the flood. Cattle feed was in short supply due to agricultural devastation caused by flood waters. Rescue teams were dispatched to the area. In order to force flood water into the sea, the navy assisted the boats.

On January 9, 2017, an image of a flooded area close to the Pra River was taken by the Operational Land Imager (OLI) on the Landsat 8 satellite. The tan and yellow hues in the imagery were due to silt-laden floodwaters. The same region was depicted in a previous shot taken on February 2, 2014, when the water levels were lower.

According to Thai authorities, the downpour which started on January 1, 2017, was one of the worst to hit Thailand in three decades. Infrastructure was severely damaged as more than 300,000 homes had been affected. The DDPM of the Ministry of Interior also estimated that 4,314 road segments, 348 bridges, 126 weirs, and 2 sluices were among the destroyed infrastructure. The extensive area of heavy rain and the simultaneous occurrence of numerous dam breaks severely damaged the local logistics infrastructure.

The government made efforts in disaster restoration works by utilizing the military. Roughly 120 billion baht (US$4 billion) in damages were foreseenby mid-January, much of it due to lost production in agriculture, tourism, and infrastructure. Palm and rubber plantations were hit particularly hard as well.

== Impacts ==
=== Healthcare ===
==== Flood related diseases ====
There were concerns over an increased risk of disease brought on by flooding. According to the Yala province's public health officer, Dr. Utitsak Harirattanakul, there were 365 cases of flood-related illness between January 19 and January 26, most of which were respiratory illnesses, food poisoning, red eyes, or dengue fever. The Ministry of Public Health highlighted worries on February 1, 2017, about the potential spread of leptospirosis once the floods in the southern region had subsided. In the provinces of Krabi and Trang, 157 cases were documented and 3 people died from the illness since the beginning of the year.

=== Education ===
The Ministry of Education reported that more than 41,000 pupils in 11 provinces in the south were severely affected by flooding. According to Boonrux Yodpheth, secretary-general of the Office of the Basic Education Commission, schools in 26 educational zones in addition to residences and farms in those provinces were also severely impacted. The flash floods in Songkhla prompted the closure of at least two schools in the province's prominent commercial area, Hat Yai, for two days.

=== Economy ===
Farmland and supply yields were negatively affected in addition to the structural deterioration. Major rubber plantations in southern Thailand provide a large portion of the nation's rubber supply. The estimated production for 2016–2017 was 10% lower as a result of the floods. The continuous floods and persistent rain ruined close to 1 million rai of cropland (Over 990,000 rai were for planting crops, 39,000 rai for animal farms, and 19,000 rai for grassland). According to Uthai Sonlucksub, president of the Natural Rubber Council of Thailand, southern Thailand was a significant rubber-producing region, and the floods hit this area at a difficult moment for farmers by disrupting infrastructure. He further added that since the demand exceeded supply, the price of rubber would inflate the following year.

Both agricultural and non-agricultural industries saw decreased employment because of the economic recession that diminished domestic consumption. However, the number of Chinese and Russian visitors increased. The University of the Thai Chamber of Commerce (UTCC) anticipated that the region's 3.2% economic growth would reduce by 1.2 percentage points. The damage was forecasted to lower the southern region's GDP growth from an earlier forecast projection of a 3.2% increase to merely a 2% growth. 8.6% of the country's GDP is attributable to the south. The regional GDP was predicted to have increased by 2.9% from the previous year to 1.13 trillion baht. A Department of Business Development study indicated that, in varying degrees, 43,000 enterprises had taken the brunt of damage. The impact of the flooding on the nation's GDP as a whole, according to Mr. Vachira, was anticipated to be minimal – only 0.1%, to be exact.

=== Infrastructure ===
The Khlong Pho Reservoir overflowed due to the torrential rain, resulting in flooding in the Uthai Thani province's Phai Khiao and Bo Yang sub-districts. According to reports, the water level in some areas reached up to 80 cm, destroying the roadways and jeopardizing various plantation activities. 578,814 homes in 12,949 localities were impacted by flooding, resulting in 29 fatalities. Over 3 million rai of agricultural land, 14,097 fish ponds, 2,055 roads, and 4,129 dwellings were affected. The northern province of Tak, with at least 29 buildings affected in Ban Rom Klao Sahamit in tambon Khiri Rat of the Phrop Phra district, recorded severe flash floods due to heavy rainfall. The village's main road was covered in a deep layer of mud that made it impassable. Several bridges on the country's primary north–south route were washed away in one instance of flash floods, causing a 200 kilometer (125 mile) traffic backup. Numerous rivers, like the Tapi River, inundated adjacent settlements and their barricades, forcing people to flee to higher land. It was projected that infrastructure, including roads, railroads, bridges, and dwellings, would suffer damage worth 3.4 billion baht from the overall damage; agricultural, 8.1 billion baht; and companies and industry, primarily small and medium-sized organizations, 10.9 billion baht.

=== Tourism ===
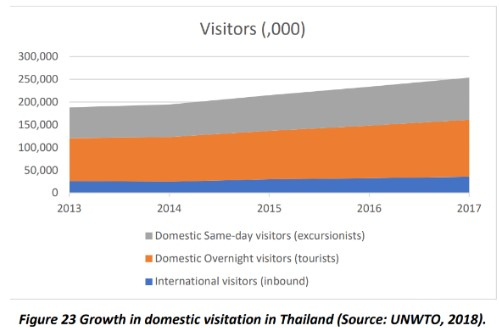
Growth in domestic visitation in Thailand

The devastating effects of massive floods severely impacted Thailand's tourist sector. The second-largest economy in Southeast Asia, Thailand depends heavily on tourism, which employs around 15% of the labor force and accounts for roughly 6% of GDP. The renowned islands of Ko Samui and Ko Pha-ngan were among those hit by the unseasonal weather, which is peak travel season in Thailand. The Andaman Coast also witnessed rain and large waves, with Krabi and Trang among the regions suffering the brunt of the monsoon rains. The Gulf Coast of Thailand suffered the worst weather. Additionally, flooding damaged cultural heritage sites and restricted access to tourist locations.

In several southern provinces, transportation was affected by the flood waters, with road, rail, and aviation services all suffering. The airport in Nakhon Si Thammarat was temporarily closed because of flooding. Due to floods on the railway in Prachuap Khiri Khan, train services between Bangkok and the south were delayed, resulting in trains to the south stopping at Hua Hin (one of the top tourist destinations). Ferry, speedboat, and longtail boat services between the islands along the Gulf Coast were also discontinued until the situation improved.

Despite the nation's high unemployment rate brought on by severe floods and tropical storms, the number of international visitors increased significantly during this time. Chinese visitors in particular increased dramatically, helped by temporary initiatives to reduce and waive visa fees, and that year's Chinese New Year fell in January. The number of tourists from Europe and Russia also steadily increased, as evidenced by increased domestic and international flights.

== Response ==
=== Local ===
Gen Prayut stated that the government raised the crisis' intensity from level 2 to level 3 in response to the circumstance, permitting the use of national and regional processes and allowing all relevant agencies to work closely together to meet the requirements of the victims. In order to deal with the issue, more than 4,000 officers, 671 flat-bottomed and carbon fiber boats, 142 trucks, 107 water thrusters, 200 water pumping devices, 16 power generators, and 5 helicopters were dispatched to the flooded areas.

==== NHSO ====
The National Health Security Office (NHSO) held a meeting on making free medical care available to flood victims through a system known as the "gold card" healthcare program. The NHSO meeting, presided over by Public Health Minister Piyasakol Sakolsatayadorn, decided that for the time being, inhabitants of disaster-affected areas could receive free medical care through the universal healthcare program in hospitals they were not affiliated with. The action was aimed to make medical care more accessible to locals in places where local hospitals were inaccessible due to flooding. The NHSO also asked for emergency funding to aid hospitals that were impacted by flooding.

==== Navy ====
The Royal Thai Navy sent ships, aircraft, and officers in order to assist flood victims in the southern region. The first ship was scheduled to arrive in Nakhon Si Thammarat on January 8. The Navy deployed 20 thruster ships, landing craft, and personnel to assist flood victims in Nakhon Si Thammarat. Along with the transport ship HTMS Angthong with a helipad, the thruster ships departed from Phra Chulachomklao Navy Garage in Samut Prakarn province with supplies and additional personnel. The HTMS Angthong operated as a field hospital, kitchen, and command center for food and relief supplies. Helicopters were used in the effort to move supplies from the ship to the inundated areas.

==== Royal Family ====
The southern provinces of Surat Thani, Phatthalung, and Songkhla received hay as aid for affected farms because of a scheme backed by Her Royal Highness Princess Maha Chakri Sirindhorn. Representatives from the Provincial Division of Veterinary Inspection and Quarantine, the Provincial Livestock Department, and the Provincial Bureau of Animal Nutrition Development joined Weerachai Wirotesaengarun from the town of Satun to officially launch the program. To help farmers affected by the floods, the initiative sent out 10 trucks each holding 2,000 bushels of hay. According to Mr. Weerachai, Princess Sirindhorn partnered with Chulalongkorn University and the Livestock Department to create an animal feed development center and make animal feed. The facility includes technological improvements in development and provides farmers with animal feed as necessary.

Prime Minister Gen Prayut Chan-o-cha claimed the well-being of those affected by the floods in the south was a concern for HM King Maha Vajiralongkorn Bodindradebayavarangkun and other Royal Family members on January 14. The flood victims received relief packages and other requirements from His Majesty. The majority of the flooded districts were unreachable due to the intense flooding, but the prime minister claimed that both the central and local governments were working around the clock to supply cooked food to those areas.

=== International ===
==== United States ====
On February 16, 2017, Glyn T. Davies, the U.S. ambassador to Thailand, announced an additional $500,000 to support disaster risk reduction initiatives that would assist Thai communities and schools to be better prepared for floods and other natural disasters. With this support from USAID, Save the Children expanded its current work on disaster risk reduction in Yala, Narathiwat, Pattani, and Nakhon Si Thammarat, the province most severely affected by the flooding.

While visiting families who had been affected by the flooding last month, Ambassador Davies remarked, "The United States stands in solidarity and friendship with the Thai people as they deal with the aftermath of the storm. We will never forget Thailand's assistance following Hurricane Katrina, which devastated New Orleans and the surrounding communities in 2005. When a tragedy strikes, being ready for the unexpected can save lives and hasten recovery. We think that by providing this support, individuals would be able to prepare for emergencies by knowing where to go and how to safeguard their property and selves."

==== Malaysia ====
Money was given to the victims of the floods that severely affected southern Thailand in January by a group of businessmen from Malaysia. Sakon Chantharak, the governor of Nakhon Si Thammarat, welcomed the group from Malaysia's state of Kelantan in the first week of March 2017. They gave him 300,000 baht to use for repairing and upgrading homes that had been harmed by the floods.

== Mitigation and relief efforts ==
=== Thai Red Cross Society ===
After the disaster, the Thai Red Cross Society, led by Her Majesty Queen Sirikit, offered assistance in the devastated districts. Relief kits were provided with food, water, and necessities. Families in ten severely impacted provinces – Sakon Nakhon, Ubon Ratchathani, Sisaket, Lopburi, Roi Et, Surin, Nakhon Ratchasima, Phichit, Chaiyaphum, and Mukdahan – received 8,432 relief kits totaling more than 8,432,000 baht.

=== Disaster Prevention and Mitigation Department (DDPM) ===
The Disaster Prevention and Mitigation Department (DDPM) urged officials in the provinces where the water had receded to conduct thorough damage assessments so the government could launch post-flood assistance programs accordingly. The DDPM also contacted responsible agencies in the affected areas about providing assistance measures. Irrigation officials constructed 22 water jet propulsion drives over the Moon River at a bridge in Ubon Ratchathani to hasten the rate of discharge into the Mekong River as a significant amount of runoff from other flooded regions was anticipated to flow into the province through the Moon River. The government intended to review response initiatives and warning systems for future catastrophes and prevention actions to ensure that they are well prepared for what is not an unusual occurrence in Thailand.

=== Military, Government and NGOs ===
Relief activities in impacted regions were carried out owing to the combined efforts of the military, government, and non-governmental organizations (NGOs) operating in the various sectors once most of the flood water was drained. A total of 50 jet propulsion devices and more than 70 water pumps were built to dump water into the sea, and nearby army facilities provided vehicles and personnel for rescue efforts. Many homes were also moved to avoid damages from further flooding. Around 897,000 farm animals were evacuated; 14,000 animals received medical attention, and 480,000 kg of animal feed were supplied.

=== Agricultural Research Development Agency (ARDA) ===
Thailand's Prasang, Chai Buri, and Vieng-Sra districts received emergency assistance from ARDA Thailand. Initial evaluations by Phuket Mission Hospital revealed that food and water were the most crucial requirements of the impacted populations. ARDA Thailand and Phuket Mission Hospital declared that they would distribute food help to the following areas: Sai Khueng, Prasang District; Songprak, Chai Buri District; and Tung Luang, Vieng Sra District. The response was divided into two phases of distribution. The first distribution of aid was made to 218 households in Prasang & Chaiburi Districts, while the second was to 260 families in Vieng-Sra District. Working with the Mission Hospital and local authorities, the locations chosen for ARDA involvement were determined by narrowing down the sub-districts and following villages most affected by floods. Village leaders of the pre-selected communities recommended families to get assistance based on their assessment of whose dwellings were in the poorest locations, and their selection of the most deserving candidates.

== See also ==
- 2010 Thailand Floods
- 2011 Southern Thailand floods
- 2011 Thailand floods
- 2013 Southeast Asian floods
- 2014-15 floods in Southeast Asia and South Asia
