= Floods in Thailand =

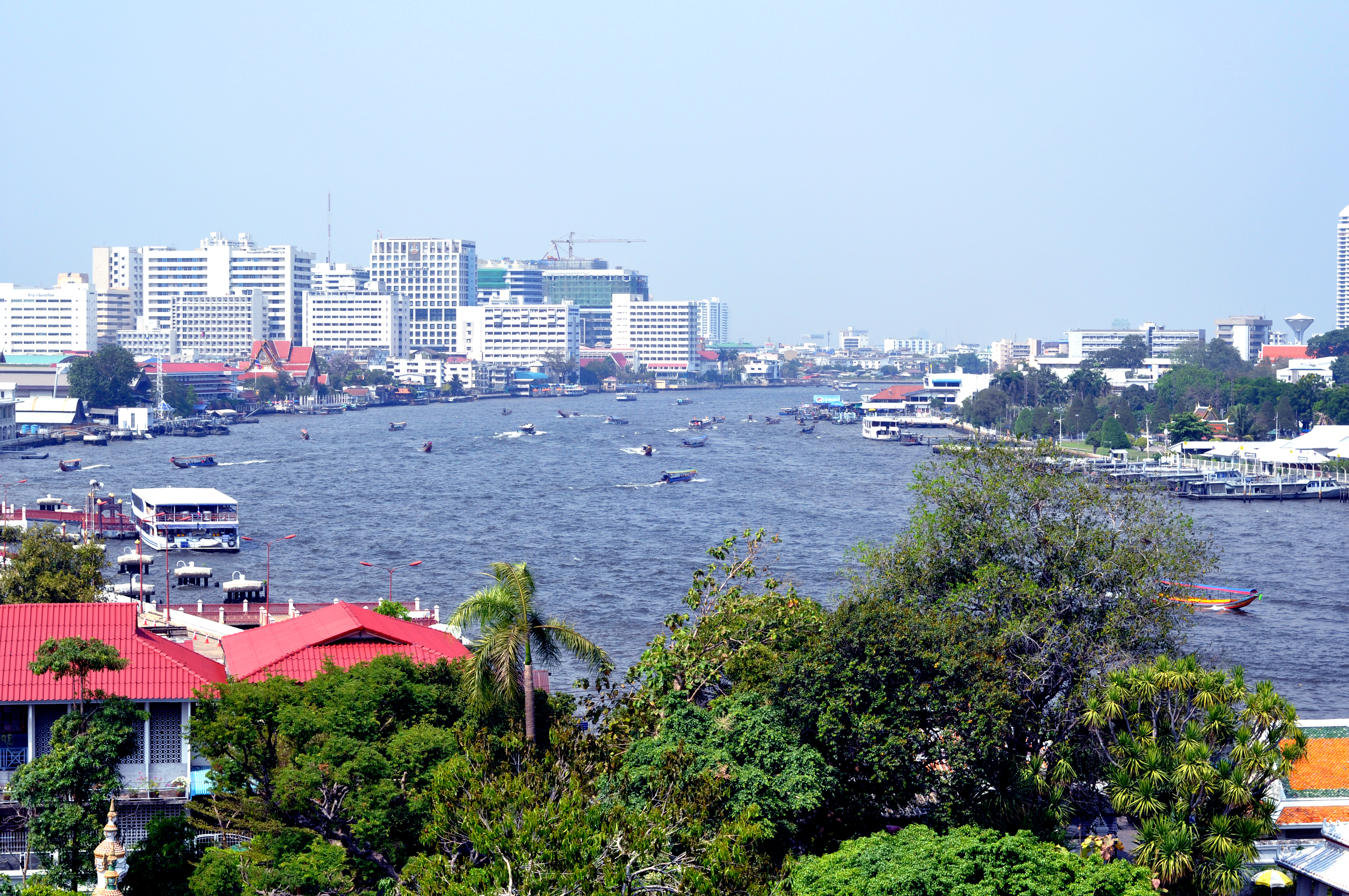
Chao Phraya River Development has narrowed stretches of the river contributing to flooding in Bangkok

Floods are regular natural disasters in Thailand which happen nearly every year during the monsoon season. The monsoon seasons in the country are distinct by region, the southern part mirrors the Malay Peninsula and monsoon begins in October and ends in March. The rest of the nation has monsoons and/or frequent thundershowers from April/May through October, but often lasts beyond October.

Thailand cycles yearly between drought and flooding. Breaking this cycle was the subject of the "Sustainable Water Management Forum 2016" in Bangkok. The event hosted water management specialists from countries which have dealt with water management challenges such as the Netherlands, Israel, and Singapore. One attendee observed that, "In Thailand, we receive around 754,000 million m^{3} of rain per year. That is more than enough for the annual water demand of around 100,000 million m^{3} However, only 5.7 percent of rainfall, 70,370 million m^{3}, empties into the reservoirs."

== Events ==
- 1938 – Bangkok was flooded
- 1983 – 42 provinces were flooded
- 1995 – Big floods in Bangkok
- 2000 – Hat Yai and Southern Provinces
- 2010 floods in Thailand and north Malaysia
- 2011 Southern Thailand floods
- 2011 Thailand floods
- 2013 Southeast Asian floods
- 2014–2015 floods in Southeast Asia and South Asia
- 2016–17 Southern Thailand floods
- 2024–2025 floods in Southeast Asia and South Asia
- 2026 Bangkok floods
