= 2011 Southern Thailand floods =

Natural disaster in Thailand

2011 Thai floods
- Date: 23 March 2011
- Location: Thailand
- Deaths: 53
- Property damage: At least $500 million (USD)

The 2011 Thai floods occurred at the end of March 2011, normally the latter part of the dry season (Thai: ฤดูแล้ง, romanized: reutdu lang or หน้าแล้ง nah lang) in tropical Thailand. Heavy rain fell in the southern region, with over 120 centimetres (47 in) of rain falling in certain areas.

== Impact ==
At least 53 people died and almost nine million people were affected by the floods after localized heavy rains. The flooding affected 50 of Thailand's 76 provinces. Close to 160,000 ha (400,000 acres) of land were submerged. Around 5,000 households were evacuated, in addition to hundreds of tourists.

Nakhon Si Thammarat Province was worst-affected, and a state of emergency was declared in several provinces.

== Causes ==
The floods hit during a typically dry season, and were triggered when a record cold wave moved south from East Asia and produced persistent flooding in combination with near-normal sea surface temperatures, still warm enough to support strong convectional precipitation. However, Thailand's Deputy Chief Negotiator for the UNFCCC stated that the floods were likely caused by climate change, as over 2,200 mm (87 in) of rain had fallen in parts of Southern Thailand for the four months leading up to the beginning of April while the year of 2010 saw a total of 270 cm (110 in).

== See also ==
- 2010 floods in Thailand and north Malaysia
- 2010 China floods
- 2011 Thai floods
- 2011 Southeast Asian floods
- Floods in Thailand
