= 2024–2025 floods in Southeast Asia and South Asia =

Major monsoon and cyclone-induced flooding across Asia

- Date: November 2024 – March 2025 (primary phase)
- Location: Sri Lanka India Indonesia Malaysia Thailand Vietnam Philippines
- Cause: Enhanced monsoon rainfall, multiple tropical cyclones (Cyclone Fengal, Ditwah, Robyn), and La Niña conditions.
- Deaths: 1,200+ (estimated)
- Property damage: > $20 billion (estimated)

Major natural floods severely impacted multiple countries across Southeast Asia and South Asia, resulting in widespread devastation beginning in late November 2024 at the onset of the monsoon season. Triggered by intense and prolonged rainfall, which was exacerbated by La Niña conditions and several tropical cyclones, the disasters primarily manifested as catastrophic flash floods and landslides. The floods caused over 1,200 fatalities, displaced millions of people, and inflicted economic damages estimated to exceed US$3.5 billion, with Sri Lanka among the most severely affected nations.

== Meteorology ==
Southeast Asia's traditional wet season, which typically spans October through March, is driven by the Australian-Indonesian monsoon (AIM) system. This meteorological phenomenon generates air currents flowing from Asia toward Australia, transporting significant moisture that results in substantial precipitation across the region. The 2024-2025 season was significantly intensified by the transition to a La Niña phase of the El Niño-Southern Oscillation (ENSO). La Niña is characterized by cooler-than-average sea surface temperatures in the central and eastern Pacific Ocean, which strengthens easterly trade winds and enhances convective rainfall over Southeast Asia and the Maritime Continent.

The concurrent activity of multiple tropical cyclones in the Bay of Bengal and the South China Sea, including Cyclone Fengal, Ditwah, and Robyn, funneled additional moisture onto the continent, leading to record-breaking rainfall totals. The Malaysian Meteorological Department projected between five and seven major rainfall events during the season, noting that the 2024–25 monsoon had the potential to surpass the severity of the 2014–15 season.

Affected country	Confirmed deaths	Injured	Missing	Displaced	Damage
Sri Lanka	607	18	214	152,537	US$7 billion
India	4	3			US$40.6 million
Indonesia	867	4,200	521	817,856	US$4 billion
Vietnam	98	727	12	235,000	US$3.2 billion
Thailand	200				US$4.3 billion

== Impact by country ==
=== Sri Lanka ===
Sri Lanka faced one of its worst flooding disasters in decades, triggered by two major weather systems in rapid succession. In late November 2024, a tropical depression that later intensified into Cyclone Fengal dumped torrential rains on the island, particularly affecting the Western, Southern, and Sabaragamuwa Provinces. This was followed in early December by heavy rains from Cyclone Ditwah, which exacerbated flooding and caused new landslides.

- Fatalities and displacement: The combined disasters killed at least 78 people across the island. The initial wave in November claimed 17 lives, while subsequent flooding and landslides in December raised the toll significantly. Over 500,000 people were displaced from their homes, with more than 250,000 seeking refuge in temporary evacuation centers set up in schools and public buildings.
- Areas affected: The worst-hit districts included Ratnapura, Kegalle, Kalutara, Galle, and Matara. In Ratnapura, the city was submerged under several feet of water after the Kalu Ganga river burst its banks. Landslides in the tea-plantation regions of Kegalle buried entire villages, complicating rescue efforts.
- Infrastructure and economy: Critical infrastructure was severely damaged. The main expressways connecting Colombo to the south were closed due to flooding and washouts. The agriculture sector, a key part of the economy, was devastated. Over 100,000 hectares of paddy fields were destroyed just before the main harvest, and vital tea, rubber, and spice plantations suffered extensive damage. Preliminary government estimates placed economic losses at over $800 million, with the full cost expected to rise.
- Rescue and challenges: The Sri Lankan military deployed over 10,000 troops for search, rescue, and evacuation operations. The Sri Lanka Air Force conducted air-drops of supplies to cut-off villages. Challenges were immense due to persistent rain, damaged roads, and the sheer scale of the disaster.

=== India ===
Heavy rains brought by Cyclone Fengal severely impacted Tamil Nadu and the union territory of Puducherry in early December 2024. The cyclone made landfall near Chennai, bringing torrential rains that caused widespread urban flooding, river overflows, and landslides in the hilly Western Ghats region. Official reports confirmed at least 20 deaths. Incidents included electrocutions in Chennai, fatal house collapses in Ooty (Udhagamandalam), and landslides in Tiruvannamalai district. The Chennai International Airport suspended operations for over 48 hours due to a flooded runway.

=== Indonesia ===
As a tropical low, Cyclone Robyn brought heavy rains to Sumatra and Java, Indonesia, killing 41 people, including 30 in North Sumatra, five in Central Java, three in East Java, two in West Sumatra and one in Aceh. The flash floods and landslides destroyed hundreds of homes and critical infrastructure, displacing tens of thousands.

=== Malaysia ===
The floods in Malaysia occurred in several severe waves from November 2024 through early 2025, affecting both Peninsular and East Malaysia.

- First Wave (Nov-Dec 2024): By 1 December 2024, flooding had claimed three lives and displaced 148,024 people across 10 states, with Kelantan and Terengganu worst hit. The official residence of the Menteri Besar of Kedah was flooded.
- Second and Third Waves: Subsequent waves in December and January affected Johor, Sarawak, and Sabah. In East Malaysia, continuous rain from 27 January 2025 caused massive flooding. By 30 January, over 10,647 people were evacuated in Sarawak and Sabah. A riverbank collapse in Kota Bharu highlighted severe erosion.

=== Thailand ===
In Thailand, the southern regions were severely affected. Late November 2024 flooding impacted over 135,000 households, causing one death and displacing over 2,700 people.

== Response ==
=== Sri Lankan response ===
The Government of Sri Lanka, led by President Ranil Wickremesinghe, declared a state of emergency in the worst-hit provinces. The Disaster Management Centre (DMC) coordinated a massive response involving all three branches of the armed forces. International aid poured in, with India launching "Operation Neighbourhood First" and dispatching naval ships with relief materials, field hospitals, and emergency rescue teams. The United Nations and agencies like the World Food Programme (WFP) provided emergency food and shelter kits.

=== Malaysian authorities ===
Prime Minister Anwar Ibrahim mandated cabinet ministers to assist in flood-affected regions. Deputy Prime Minister Ahmad Zahid Hamidi coordinated the national disaster response, mobilising over 83,000 personnel and 31 helicopters. For the East Malaysia floods in 2025, the federal government allocated **RM25 million (US$5.3 million)** for immediate infrastructure repairs. Banks offered loan moratoriums and relief financing to affected customers.

== See also ==
- 2006–2007 Southeast Asian floods
- 2010 floods in Thailand and north Malaysia
- 2014–2015 floods in Southeast Asia and South Asia
- 2023 Sri Lanka floods
