= 2026 Bangkok floods =

Natural disaster in Thailand

- A depression passing through Thailand
- Date: 24–30 September 2026
- Location: Bangkok and adjacent provinces
- Cause: Heavy rainfall triggered by an active low-pressure system/tropical depression and strong seasonal monsoon conditions
- Deaths: 40 (including floods across the country)
- Property damage: ฿11 billion+ (US$327 million+)

On 26 September 2026 at 10:16 local time (UTC+7), a flood disaster emergency was declared in Bangkok following 48 hours of continuous heavy rain, which submerged main roads and triggered mass evacuations. Over 300 mm (12 in) of rain was recorded in certain parts of Bangkok, with floodwaters blocking traffic on main roads in 37 locations. The Bangkok Metropolitan Administration (BMA) reported that it would take two to three days to drain the floodwaters after the rain stopped. Authorities declared all 50 districts of the city a disaster zone. It was the worst flooding to affect Bangkok in 15 years.

== Weather system ==
Map plotting the storm's track and intensity, according to the Saffir–Simpson scale Map key Saffir–Simpson scale Tropical depression (≤38 mph, ≤62 km/h) Tropical storm (39–73 mph, 63–118 km/h) Category 1 (74–95 mph, 119–153 km/h) Category 2 (96–110 mph, 154–177 km/h) Category 3 (111–129 mph, 178–208 km/h) Category 4 (130–156 mph, 209–251 km/h) Category 5 (≥157 mph, ≥252 km/h) Unknown Storm type Tropical cyclone Subtropical cyclone Extratropical cyclone, remnant low, tropical disturbance, or monsoon depression

On the morning of 24 September, the Japan Meteorological Agency (JMA) reported that a tropical depression had formed over Cambodia near Krong Siem Reap. The system exited the basin the following day, and the IMD began monitoring a related upper-level cyclonic circulation over southern Thailand and Myanmar on 26 September. The next day, the Joint Typhoon Warning Center (JTWC) issued a TCFA for the system, citing a high chance of development within 24 hours. On 28 September, the IMD upgraded the well-marked low-pressure area to a depression. Later that day, the IMD further upgraded the system to a deep depression. On 29 September at 00:30 local time, the JTWC canceled the TCFA as the system moved inland. Later that day, the IMD reported that the system had weakened to a depression as the floodwaters began to ease. By 30 September, the depression weakened into a low pressure area over Myanmar.

== Impact ==
Flooding near Lak Si Station on 27 September

A 5-year-old girl died from electrocution in the car park of a housing complex in Khlong Chan. Two fatalities were confirmed in Bueng Kum district: a 3-year-old boy who drowned after slipping and falling while moving belongings from his house, and a 8-year-old bedridden girl who drowned after being unable to evacuate.

The city closed over 400 municipal schools on 28 September as flooding persisted in the outer districts, even though the weather was improving.

The Cabinet of Thailand approved 28 and 29 September as special holidays in Bangkok, Pathum Thani, Samut Prakan, and Nonthaburi for people to "take care of themselves and their families." On 28 September, a man was arrested for riding a jet ski through the floodwaters in Huai Khwang district.

Backlogged cargo overflowed the cargo terminal at Suvarnabhumi Airport as a result of staff shortages due to the flooding.

At Suvarnabhumi Airport, flooding disrupted Thai Airways operations by limiting the availability of ground-handling staff. This led to numerous flight cancellations to and from Bangkok on 28 and 29 September, leaving 5,600 bags stranded inside the airport. Sixty-nine Royal Thai Air Force personnel were called in to clear the backlog and aid in ground operations. Thai Airways CEO Chai Eamsiri apologized for the luggage crisis and set a 72-hour target to clear the remaining bags from the airport. On 2 October, the board of directors of Thai Airways decided to remove Chai from his post.

On 30 September, Toyota shut down four plants since continued flooding prevented parts deliveries, as the death toll rose to forty people.

Thai Airways said it would suspend inbound and outbound cargo operations from 30 September through 6 October because flooding had prevented some employees from reaching work.

=== Wider area ===
Flooding also affected areas beyond Bangkok. As of 26 September, more than 84,000 people across 21 Thai provinces had been affected, particularly in the central region.

By 29 September, the death toll from the floods had risen to 23 people, with the disaster causing at least US$320 million in damage. Eight people died in Samut Prakan, six in Sa Kaeo, and four in Bangkok.

== See also ==
- Floods in Thailand
- 2026 Pacific typhoon season
- 2026 North Indian Ocean cyclone season
