= 2010 Colombo floods =

2010 incident of flooding in Sri Lanka

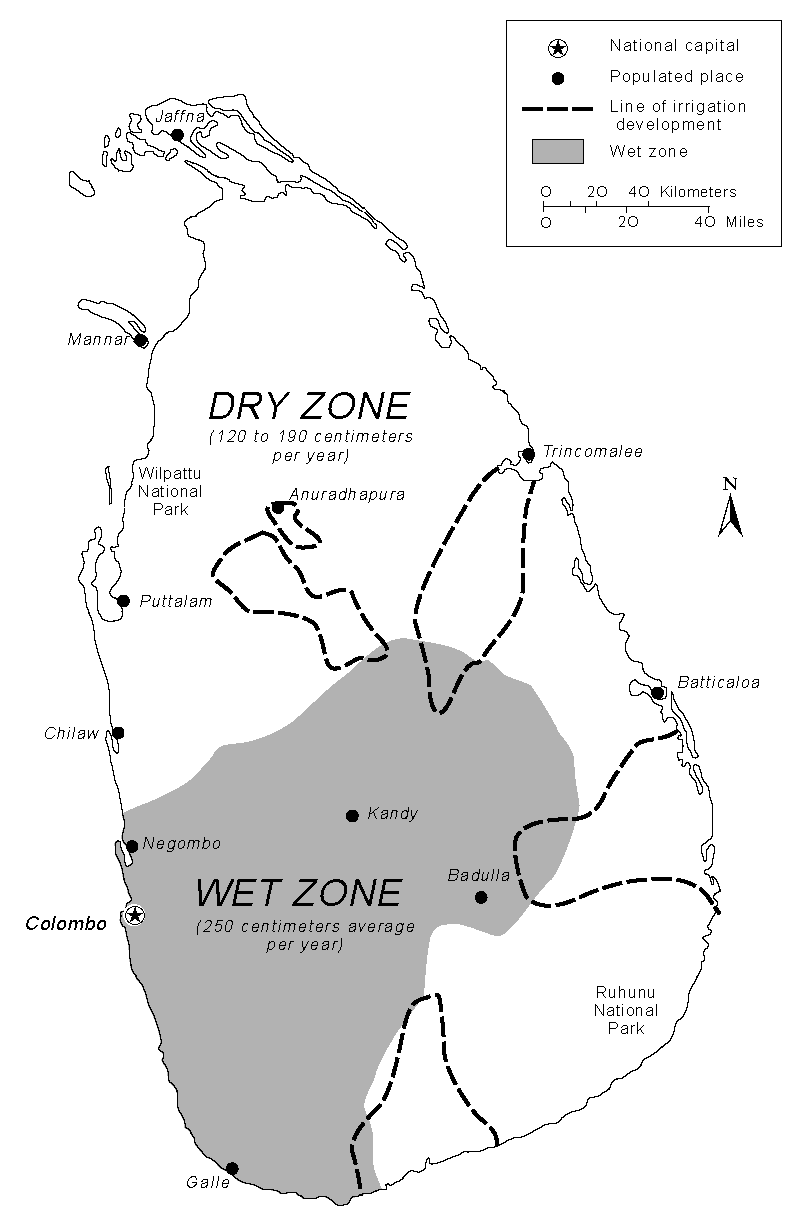
- Location of Colombo in Sri Lanka's wet zone.
- Date: 19:00 10 November, to 12:00 11 November
- Location: Colombo
- Deaths: 1

The 2010 Colombo floods were an isolated incident that took place between 10 November and 11 November 2010 in Colombo, Sri Lanka. As a low-pressure area developed over the city, up to 490 mm (19.3 in) of rain fell during the short period of 15 hours overnight, causing widespread damage and flooding in the area; the highest amount of rainfall in 18 years. A joint Government-UN assessment was launched on the 13th to understand the level of damage in the affected areas.

== Damage ==
According to the Disaster Management Centre, the heavy rains displaced over 260,000 people in Colombo and suburbs. Heavy rains also submerged the parliament under 4 ft (122 cm) of water, and damaged 257 houses, while completely destroying 11. Current death toll stands at 1.

The Ministry of Education have also requested all schools to be closed during the period., while the Ministry of Labour Relations entitled paid-leave for government employees.

Multiple grid substations were also shut down by the Ceylon Electricity Board in various locations in Colombo, due to the risk of being submerged. Leading to power outages in multiple areas.

== Relief efforts ==
The government deployed Air Force Bell 212 helicopters to assist in aerial assessments and missions to rescue stranded people. 1,800 Sri Lankan Army troops were deployed to relief flood victims on the ground, while the Navy deployed trawlers to provide food and transportation in the affected areas. The DMC also disbursed Rs.20 million (≈180,000 USD) to relief efforts.

The Sri Lanka navy and army also made public appeals asking flood victims to contact them for relief assistance. Television and radio stations repeatedly broadcast their contact numbers.

== See also ==
- Cyclone Jal
- Geography of Sri Lanka
