= Cyclone Robyn (2024) =

Category 2 Australian region cyclone

Tropical Cyclone Robyn
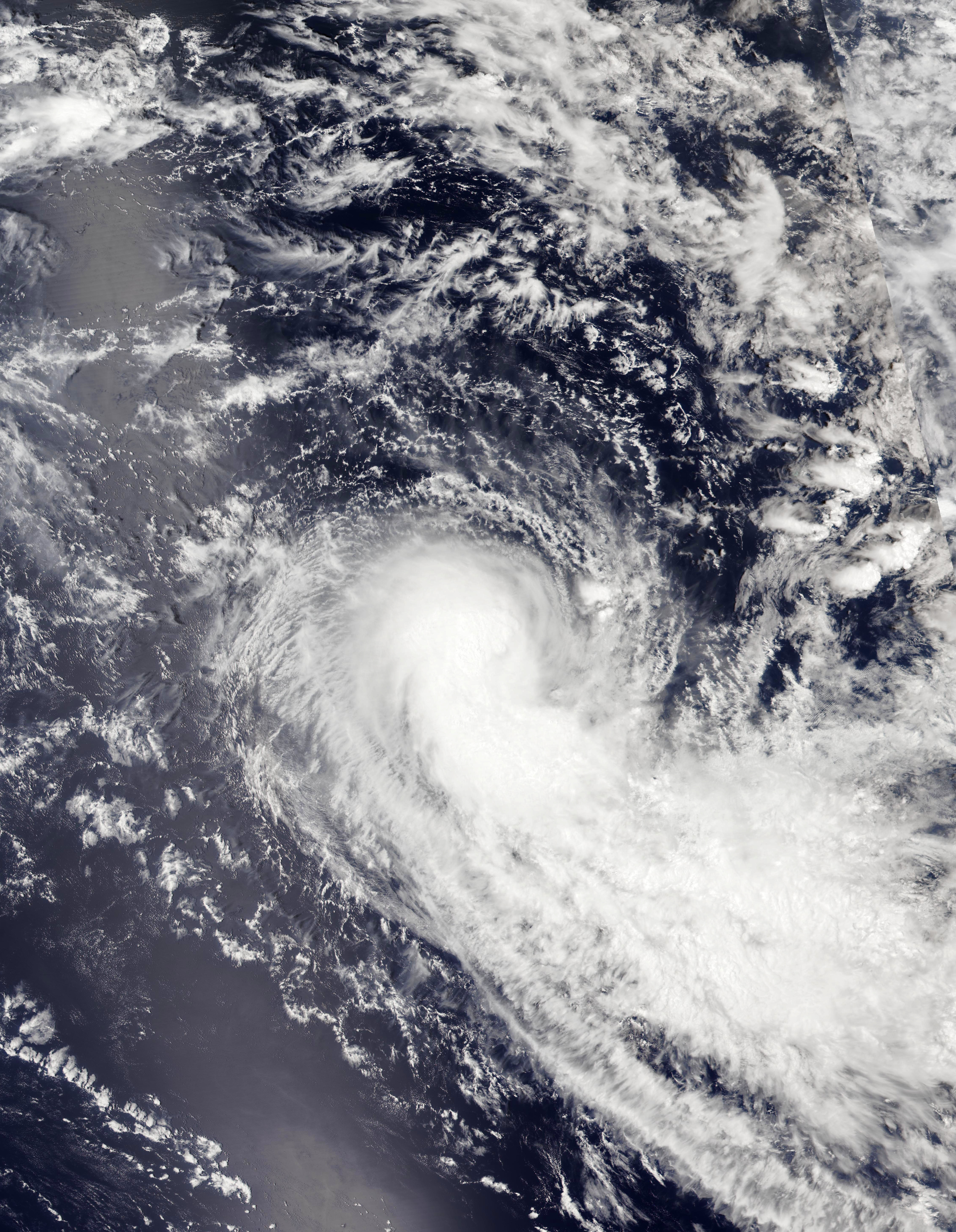
- Robyn at peak intensity on 28 November

Meteorological history
- Formed: 18 November 2024
- Dissipated: 30 November 2024

Category 2 tropical cyclone
- 10-minute sustained (BOM)
- Highest winds: 100 km/h (65 mph)
- Lowest pressure: 985 hPa (mbar); 29.09 inHg

Tropical storm
- 1-minute sustained (SSHWS/JTWC)
- Highest winds: 100 km/h (65 mph)
- Lowest pressure: 988 hPa (mbar); 29.18 inHg

Overall effects
- Fatalities: 41 total
- Injuries: 109
- Missing: 4
- Damage: >$213,000 (2024 USD)
- Areas affected: Sumatra, Java, Cocos Islands
- Part of the 2024–25 Australian region cyclone season

Tropical Cyclone Robyn was a deadly and erratic tropical cyclone that contributed towards heavy rains and flooding throughout the Indonesian islands of Sumatra and Java in November 2024. Robyn was the first tropical system to form during the 2024–25 Australian region cyclone season.

== Meteorological history ==
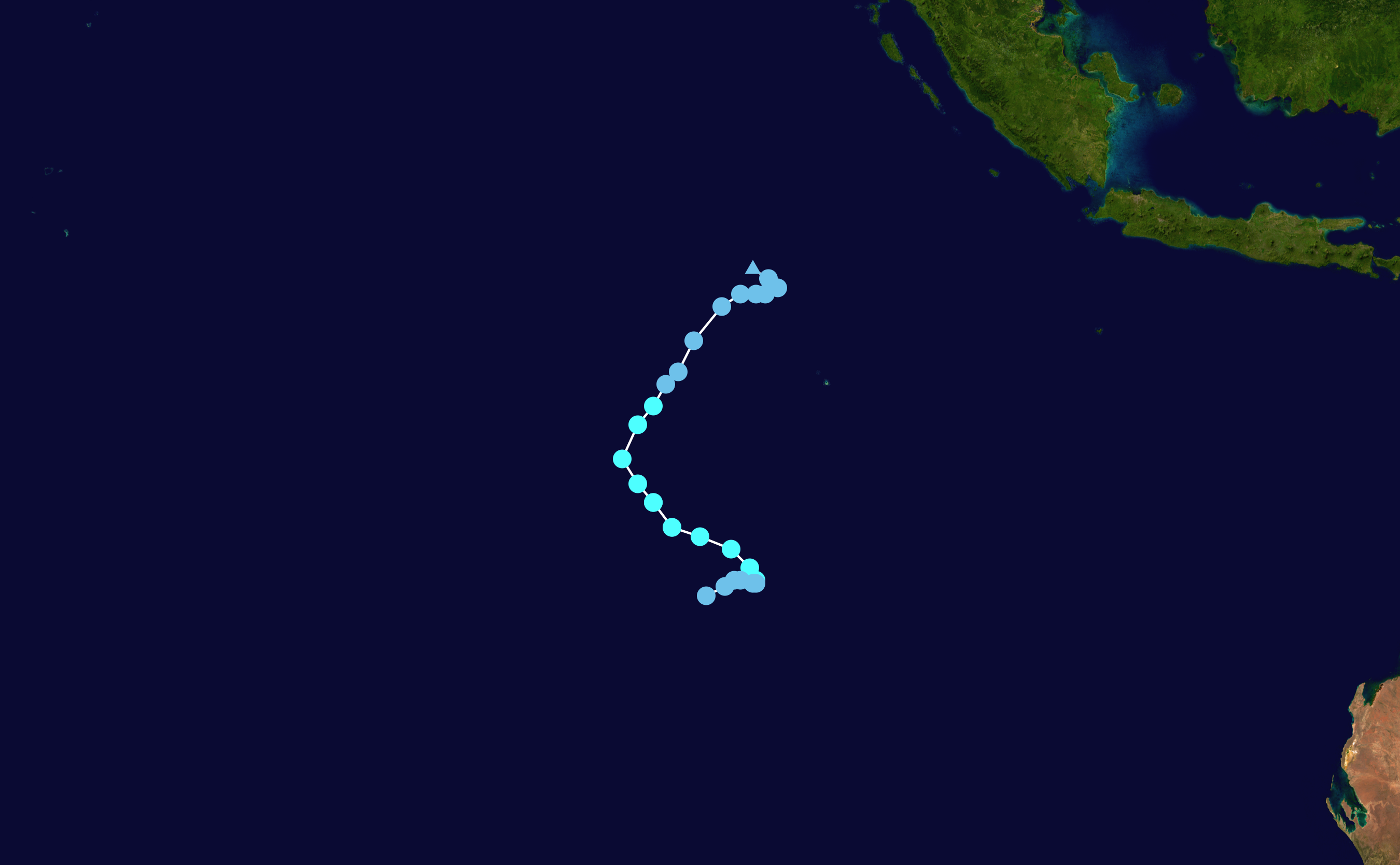
Map plotting the storm's track and intensity, according to the Saffir–Simpson scale Map key Saffir–Simpson scale Tropical depression (≤38 mph, ≤62 km/h) Tropical storm (39–73 mph, 63–118 km/h) Category 1 (74–95 mph, 119–153 km/h) Category 2 (96–110 mph, 154–177 km/h) Category 3 (111–129 mph, 178–208 km/h) Category 4 (130–156 mph, 209–251 km/h) Category 5 (≥157 mph, ≥252 km/h) Unknown Storm type Tropical cyclone Subtropical cyclone Extratropical cyclone, remnant low, tropical disturbance, or monsoon depression

By early November 2024, a moderately active Madden–Julian oscillation (MJO) moved eastwards into the Indian Ocean, aligning with an equatorial Rossby wave. On 14 November, the Australian Bureau of Meteorology (BoM) noted that a tropical low could may form to the west of Sumatra, Indonesia, and pre-designated it as 01U. This came into fruition 9 days later, when both the BoM and the United States Joint Typhoon Warning Center (JTWC) reported that the system had formed approximately 350 nmi (650 km; 400 mi) to the northwest of Cocos (Keeling) Islands, aided by a westerly wind burst that also contributed to the formation of Cyclone Fengal. Moving generally to the southeast, the low struggled to organize under an environment of moderate to high vertical wind shear, offset by 29–30 °C (84–86 °F) sea surface temperatures and improving vorticity signature. At 20:30 UTC on 26 November, the JTWC issued a Tropical Cyclone Formation Alert on 01U, as an ASCAT pass revealed gale-force winds wrapping the southwest of the low's strengthening but still disorganized low-level circulation centre. By 15:00 UTC the next day, the JTWC upgraded the low into a tropical storm in the Saffir–Simpson scale, noting a well-defined but partially exposed centre. The BoM would not follow suit until early 28 November, when the cyclone gained gale-force winds throughout its entire quadrant, becoming a category 1 tropical cyclone in the Australian scale and earning the name Robyn.

By 12:00 that same day, both the BoM and JTWC reported that Robyn reached its peak intensity, becoming a category 2 tropical cyclone with 10-minute sustained winds of 55 knots (102 km/h; 63 mph). However, strong wind shear and significant mid-level dry air entrainment made the system to rapidly weaken, prompting the BoM to downgrade Robyn to a category 1 tropical cyclone by 29 November. Six hours later, the BoM downgraded Robyn below tropical cyclone intensity, before issuing their final advisory at 12:00 UTC that same day. The JTWC followed suit three hours later, noting that the system had rapidly weakened, with a fully exposed centre. The remnants of Robyn then drifted westward, moving out of the Australian area of responsibility in early December. Despite the high number of fatalities, the name Robyn was not retired after the season.

== Preparations and impact ==
Meteorology, Climatology, and Geophysical Agency (BMKG) warned of heavy rains from 01U across Sumatra and Java, and that much of Indonesia's coastline could experience waves of up to 1.25–2.5 m (4.1–8.2 ft), with waves of 2.5–4 m (8.2–13.1 ft) expected along the coastlines of western Sumatra, Banten in Java, and at the Sunda Strait.

Heavy rains killed ten people in Karo Regency, North Sumatra, including nine from one landslide alone. In Padang Lawas Regency flooding killed five people and destroyed two houses. In Sibolangit, flooding caused four deaths, injured nine and left two missing by 24 November. On 26 November, a landslide occurred in the town, killing nine and injuring 24. Severe flooding in South Tapanuli Regency killed two people, injured 76, destroyed 16 houses and damaged 345 others, with three villages recording severe damage. In Medan, floodwaters damaged 7,699 homes, affecting 24,874 residents. Damage of the flooding in North Aceh Regency was Rp3.4 billion (US$213,000).

In Lima Puluh Kota Regency, West Sumatra, flooding killed two people and destroyed three houses. A child drowned at Subulussalam, Aceh, where 17 villages were flooded. Additionally, four people were killed by a landslide in Purworejo Regency and a man died after a river overflowed at Semarang, Central Java. Landslides also damaged 209 houses in Cianjur, West Java. The Citarum River overflowed in Bandung Regency, flooding 30 villages and damaging 2,000 homes. In Malang Regency, East Java, floodwaters killed two students, while a man died of electrocution.

Despite the amount of fatalities, Robyn was not retired after the season, and will be reused again.

== See also ==
- Tropical cyclones in 2024
- Weather of 2024
- Cyclone Fengal - The twin of Cyclone Robyn.
