= 2011 Southeast Asian floods =

Natural disasters in Asia

The 2011 monsoon season saw one record flood event in Indochina across several countries and a few separate limited flood events parts of the same nations: Thailand, Cambodia and Myanmar and heavy flooding in Vietnam. Meanwhile, Laos also sustained flood damage. By late October 2011, 2.3 million people have been hit by flooding in Thailand, while the flooding in Cambodia has affected close to 1.2 million people, according to estimates by the United Nations. Unrelated to the northern floods, Southern Thailand near Malaysia has been lashed with flooding in early November and again in December also affecting as far north as Chumporn. In the November event, Southern Thailand near Hat Yai was hit, North-central Vietnam had their own event in October. Myanmar had reported a series of limited but still deadly and destructive events from June to October.

The 2011 typhoon season in Philippines overlapped the monsoon season in Indochina, and the country was hit by a series of storms over the course of 4 months: Typhoon Nesat in September, which was followed shortly after by Typhoon Nalgae, and then in December by Tropical Storm Washi, which hit on an unusual track, timing and location.

All told, well over 2,828 have lost their lives to a series of flooding events of varying origins in Southeast Asia since August 2011 in the above-mentioned nations, worldwide supply-chain disruptions occurred in technology sector, and billion-dollar losses and severe parts shortages rippled to corporations of developed nations, and the assumption of safety from flood waters was put into question in many nations thought or assumed to be prepared.

== Damage and casualties ==
Country	Deaths	Paddy Inundated (Hectares)	Economic Damage	Homes Under water	Cities	Real-time reporting (Channels)
Thailand	730	1,327,740.64 (calculated from 8,298,379 Rai of paddy fields damaged by the flood)	Total damage US$45 billion (1440 billion Baht) (including to foreign nations and corporations) and an immediate economic cost of 1.3–1.5% Thai national GDP	766,267	Nakhon Sawan, Phitsanulok, Ayutthaya, Pathum Thani, Chainat, Sing Buri More	NBT, Thai PBS
Cambodia	250 though likely underreported as reports mysteriously stopped just as overseas government aid was accepted.	445,530	US$100–161 Million	196,600 houses inundated; 600 houses completely wiped out	Phnom Penh, Siem Reap, Kampong Thom	TVK, Bayon Television
Vietnam	78 (Mekong) +46 (north central Vietnam)	99,000	US$135 million	137,000	An Giang, Đồng Tháp, Long An, Cần Thơ, Kiên Giang	No real-time reporting
Laos	34	64,400	US$174 million (1.39 Trillion Kip)	est. 140,000 (from the number of those who suffer from the flood in Laos at 422,900 people)	Khammouane	No real-time reporting
Philippines	35 (Tropical Storm Aere); 4 (Typhoon Songda); 2 (Severe Tropical Storm Meari); 75 (Tropical Storm Nock-ten); 35 (Typhoon Nanmadol); 83 (Typhoon Nesat); 1 (Typhoon Nalgae); 10 (Tropical Storm Banyan); 1257; 85 missing (Tropical Storm Washi)	N/A	US$325 Million (PHP 14 billion); See 2011 Pacific typhoon season	N/A	Metro Manila, Cagayan de Oro, Iligan	ABS-CBN
Myanmar	215+ (late October alone)	1.7m tons		20,000 from early October event only	Mandalay, Magwe, Bago, Irrawaddy, Sagaing, Kayin, Mon, Kayah, Chin and Rakhine States.	No real-time reporting
Malaysia	19 deaths, 122 missing	?	?	207	Pahang, Johor, Terengganu	Radio Televisyen Malaysia, TV3

In Myanmar, the Mandalay, Magwe, Bago, Irrawaddy, Sagaing, Kayin, Mon, Kayah, Chin and Rakhine States and regions are heavily affected. " there were cases of deaths and loss of homes in Kyauk Hta Yan, Htonebo, Myo Lulin and Tatkone villages in Myothit Township, Magwe Region" in early October. "The local authorities and parties have not provided assistance. These local authorities even harassed us by questioning us and prohibited us to give assistance.” Flooding also has been affecting Shan State. In August, towards the beginning of the monsoon, central Bago city was inundated requiring boats for navigation and some deaths.

== See also ==
- 2013 Southeast Asian floods
- 2011 Thai floods
- 2011 Sindh floods
- 2011 China floods
- 2025 Southeast Asian floods
