= 2013 Southeast Asian floods =

Natural disaster in Asia

The 2013 monsoon season (August 2013 – December 2013) saw large-scale flooding return to Indochina after a calmer 2012 monsoon season. Poverty stricken Cambodia was hardest hit, with some 83 deaths. Countries affected also include Vietnam, Thailand, Laos, and Myanmar. Philippines has seen the annual typhoon related occurrences, which often pummel into Indochina.

== Background ==
Flooding and/or related typhoon damage is an annual occurrence in all of Southeast Asia. However, deforestation, land subsidence, poor drainage, have exacerbated existing problems, while development of infrastructure such as dams, drainage, and pumps have lessened it elsewhere. Despite a long history of devastation and little spread of news outside the region, more global attention has been paid to Southeast Asian flooding as it has become a manufacturing hub in the global supply chain and major tourist destination.

Country	Flood/Typhoon Deaths since August	Other	Cities
Thailand	73	46 provinces	Prachinburi, Chon Buri, Sa Kaeo
Cambodia	168	$1 bln damage, 24 provinces	Siem Reap, Banteay Meanchay, Kendal
Vietnam	40 Wutip, 19 Nari related (69 total)	-	Central Vietnam
Laos	20	-	-
Philippines	23 Utor, 2 Usagi, 30 Wutip, 13 Nari, 6,340 Haiyan (6,408 total)	1,061 missing, Damage $2.86 billion (2013 USD)	Visayas group of islands, parts of Luzon, parts of Mindanao
Myanmar	at least 7 deaths	300,000 homeless	-
Totals	at least 405 deaths	-	-

== Cambodia ==
83 people, half of them children were killed and the Preah Khan temple of Angkor Wat complex sustained damage. Death toll updated to 104 Oct.9

== Thailand ==
Severe flooding occurred in Eastern Thailand, especially in the provinces of Sa Kaeo, Prachin Buri, Chon Buri. Floods unrelated to the monsoon occurred in Phuket. Despite government assurances after the 2011 disaster, flooding has shutdown two factories at an Amata estate. As of Oct 9th, 28 out of 77 Thai provinces had been affected and 39 people had been killed, but the health ministry put the death toll at 51, with more than 3 million people affected since July.

== Myanmar ==
As of 22 September 2013, the floods had made some 300,000 people homeless.

== Vietnam ==
Typhoon Wutip killed 40 in Vietnam and removed 200,000 roofs.

== See also ==
- 2011 Southeast Asian floods
