= 2011 Thailand floods =

Major floods in Thailand

- Flooded areas in the north of Bangkok
- Date: 25 July 2011 – 16 January 2012 (175 days)
- Location: 65 of Thailand's 77 provinces
- Deaths: 815
- Property damage: 1.425 trillion baht (US$46.5 billion)

Severe flooding occurred during the 2011 monsoon season in Thailand. The flooding began at the end of July triggered by the landfall of Tropical Storm Nock-ten. These floods soon spread through the provinces of northern, northeastern, and central Thailand along the Mekong and Chao Phraya river basins. In October floodwaters reached the mouth of the Chao Phraya and inundated parts of the capital city of Bangkok. Flooding persisted in some areas until mid-January 2012, and resulted in a total of 815 deaths (with three missing) and 13.6 million people affected. Sixty-five of Thailand's 76 provinces were declared flood disaster zones, and over 20,000 square kilometres (7,700 sq mi) of farmland was damaged. The disaster was described by an unnamed Thai government official as "the worst flooding yet in terms of the amount of water and [number of] people affected".

The World Bank has estimated 1.425 trillion baht (US$46.5 billion) in economic losses due to flooding, as of 1 December 2011. Most of this was due to the manufacturing industry, as seven major industrial estates were inundated in water as much as 3 meters (9.8 feet) deep during the floods. Disruptions to manufacturing supply chains affected regional automobile production and caused a global shortage of hard disk drives which lasted throughout 2012.

The World Bank's estimate for this disaster means it ranks as the world's fourth costliest disaster as of 2011 surpassed only by the 2011 Tōhoku earthquake and tsunami in Japan, Great Hanshin earthquake in 1995, and Hurricane Katrina in 2005. A 2015 study suggests increasing odds for potential flooding similar to the 2011 flood intensity to occur in the future.

Thailand's southern provinces also saw seasonal flash-flooding towards the end of the year, although these were not as destructive as the floods in the more northerly provinces.

== Background ==
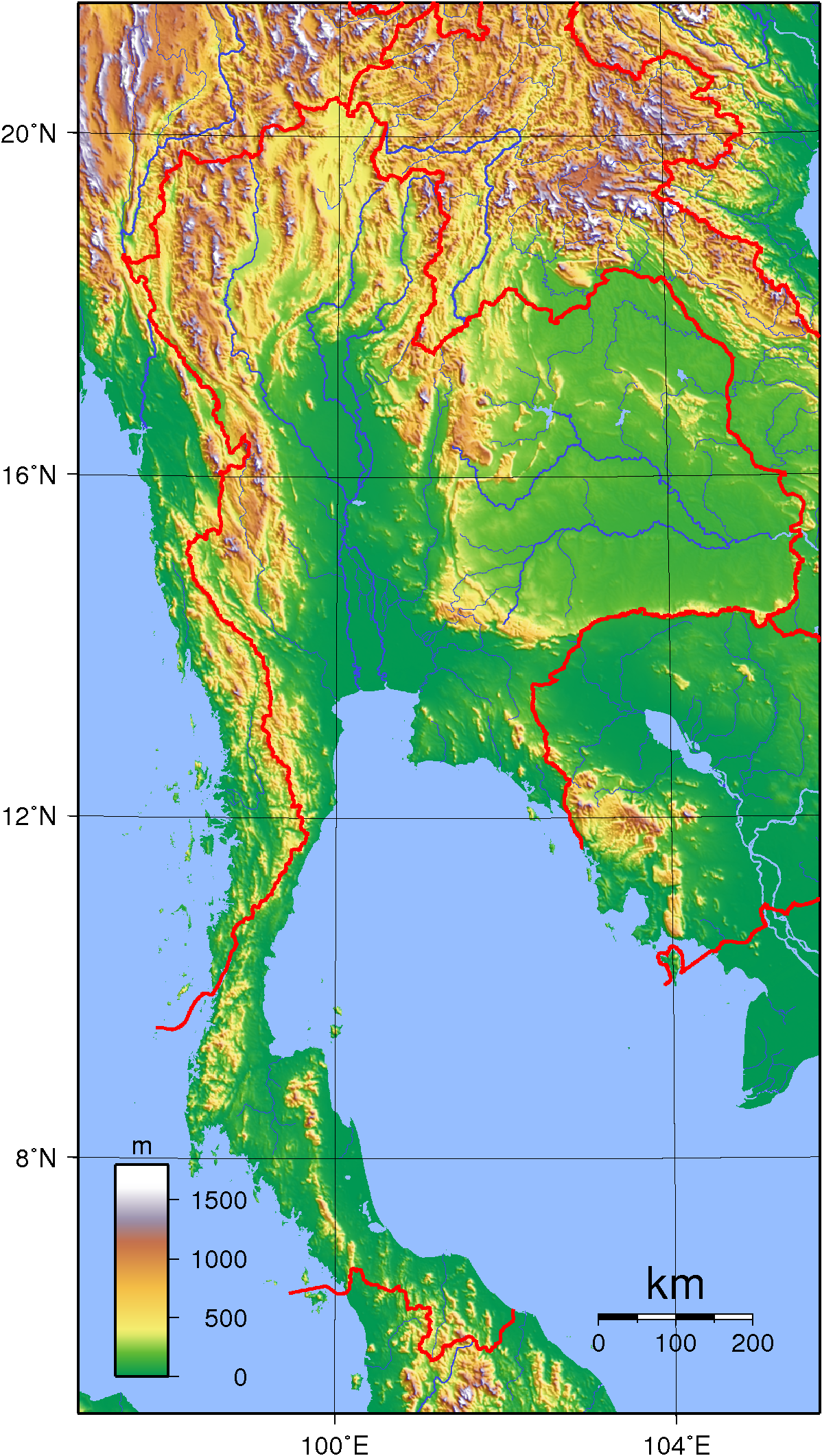
Topographical map of Thailand: Tributaries of the Chao Phraya flow from the mountainous northern region to join in the central plais, where it flows south into the Gulf of Thailand. The northeastern plateau is drained by the Chi and the Mun, which flow into the Mekong at the Thai-Lao border.

Various regions of Thailand are prone to seasonal flash-flooding due to their tropical climate. The floods often occur in the north and spread down the Chao Phraya River through the central plains, in the northeast along the Chi and Mun Rivers flowing into the Mekong, or in the coastal hillsides of the east and south. Remnants of tropical storms that strike Vietnam or the peninsular south commonly increase precipitation, resulting in further risk of flooding. Drainage control systems, including several dams, irrigation canals and flood detention basins, have been constructed, but are inadequate to prevent flood damage, especially in rural areas. Much effort, including a system of drainage tunnels begun in 2001, has been put into preventing the inundation of the capital city, which lies near the mouth of the Chao Phraya and is prone to flooding, with considerable success. Bangkok has seen only brief and minor flooding since the major flood of 1995. Other regions, however, had experienced severe flooding as recently as 2010.

Rainfall in March 2011 over the area of northern Thailand was an extraordinary 344 percent above the mean. Bhumibol Dam in particular received 242.8 mm of rain, well above the normal 25.2 mm. Since 1 January the dam had accumulated 245.9 mm, 216.0 mm or 186 percent above normal.

Bangkok's tendency to flood is particularly acute. Bangkok and adjacent provinces are only 50 cm to two meters above sea level. Sea levels are rising four mm every year. The rising sea levels push more water into the Chao Phraya River. To combat rising sea levels a barrier dam stretching from Chonburi to Hua Hin has been proposed, at a cost of 500 billion baht. The three-meter high dykes that sequester the river are subsiding, as is the rest of the city. In the past, some areas of Bangkok were sinking as much as three centimeters per year, due to excessive groundwater extraction. Groundwater extraction was halted in 1977. That step has slowed subsidence to about one centimeter per year on average. However, the sheer weight of Bangkok's ever expanding infrastructure has exacerbated the problem. Bangkok has some 700 buildings more than 20 storeys high and 4,000 buildings eight to 20 storeys high. The sheer weight of these structures displaces the spongy soil and increases subsidence. In a 2015 report, Thailand's National Reform Council warned that relocation of the capital was not out of the question.

== Flooding timeline ==
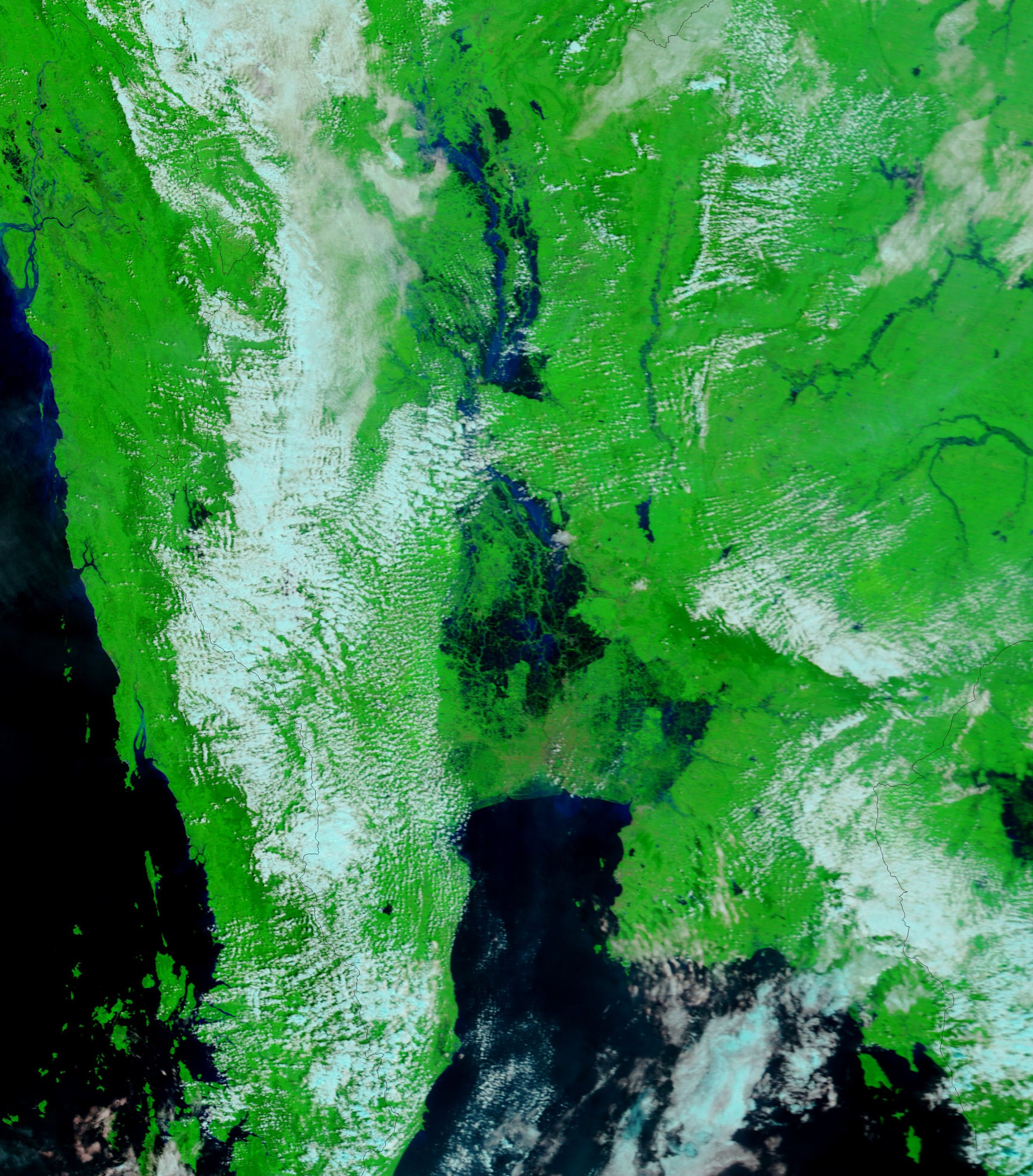
False-colour satellite image showing extent of flooding on 19 October 2011. Water is shown in dark blue.

With the monsoon season well underway in 2011, when noticeable rainfall started in May, major flooding began as Tropical Storm Nock-ten made its landfall in northern Vietnam, causing heavy precipitation in northern and northeastern Thailand and flash floods in many provinces from 31 July. (Note: The starting date for the flood season is officially 25 July.) Within one week thirteen persons had been reported dead, with ongoing flooding in the provinces of Chiang Mai, Lampang, Lamphun, Mae Hong Son, Nan, Phrae, and Uttaradit in the north, and Bung Kan, Nakhon Phanom, Nong Khai, Sakon Nakhon, and Udon Thani in the upper northeast. The upper-central provinces of Phichit, Phitsanulok, and Sukhothai were also flooded as the flooding spread down the overflowing Yom and Nan Rivers. Prachuap Khiri Khan on the gulf coast was also affected.

Flooding was still ongoing by late-August, as heavy rains were expected to continue for longer than usual due to the effect of a multi-year La Niña event. Flood waters reached a depth of 50 cm in downtown Nan, and became the highest recorded in 16 years in Phitsanulok Province, while large areas in the downstream provinces of Nakhon Sawan, Ang Thong, Ayutthaya, and Nakhon Nayok were affected and the death toll rose to 37 by 22 August. Both Bhumibol and Sirikit Dams increased discharge rates to compensate for the increase in incoming flow.

By 19 September almost all of the lower central provinces were affected by the flood: Uthai Thani, Chai Nat, Sing Buri, Ang Thong, Suphan Buri, Ayutthaya, Pathum Thani, and Nonthaburi, the latter two on the northern border of Bangkok. Broken floodgates resulted in water from the Chao Phraya flowing through irrigation canals and inundating large areas of paddy fields in Singburi, Ang Thong, and Ayutthaya, but lessened the strain on Bangkok as the fields served as water retention areas. Power boats were used to run against the river's flow while at anchor in an attempt to increase the river's discharge rate.

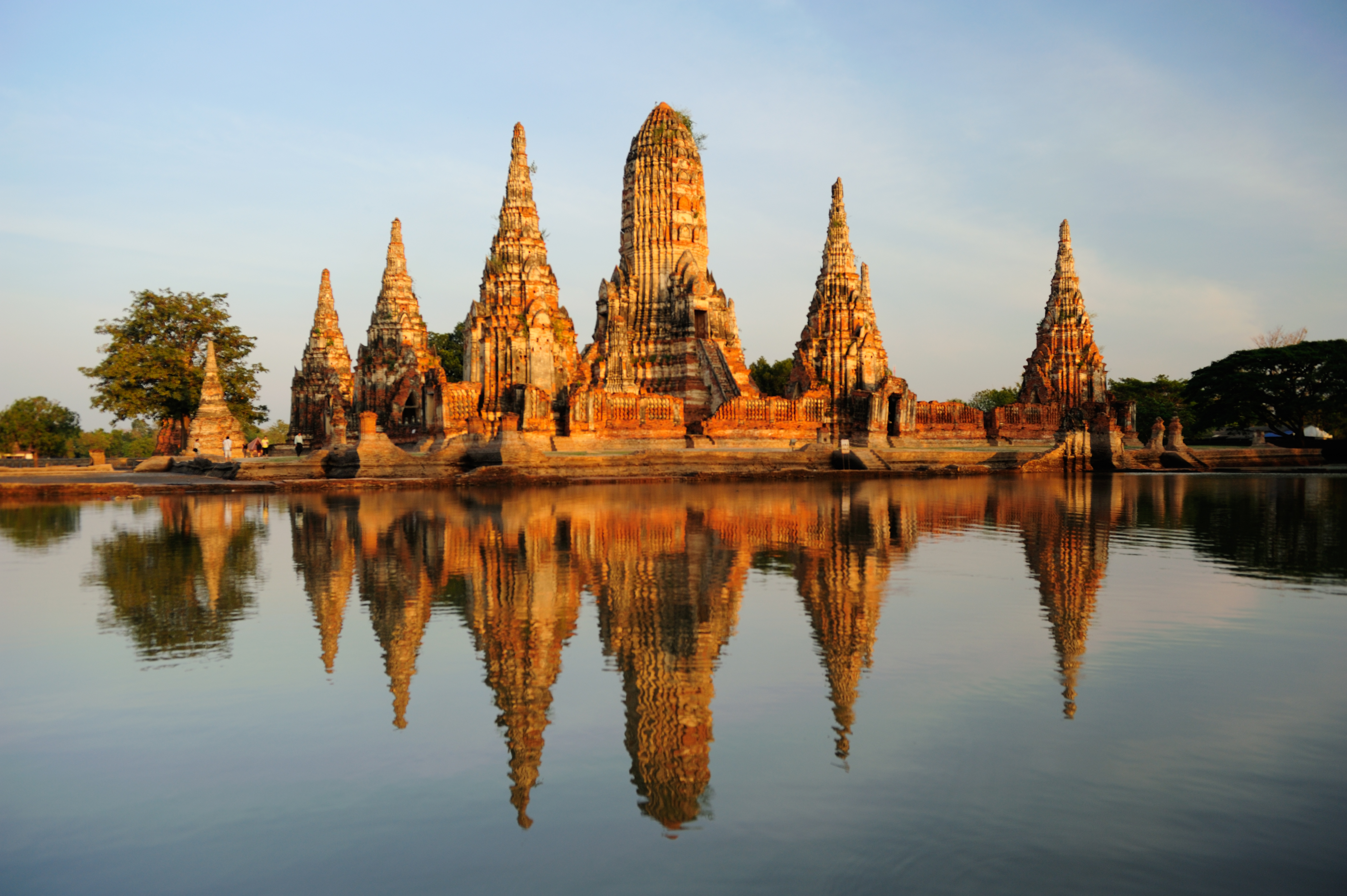
Flooding damaged several historic sites, including Wat Chai Watthanaram.

By the beginning of October, most dams were already near or over capacity and were being forced to increase their rate of discharge, potentially worsening downstream flooding. Flooding in Ayutthaya worsened and flood water entered the city itself, inundating the Ayutthaya Historical Park and forcing evacuations. Barriers protecting industrial estates failed, resulting in the flooding of dozens of major factories and a country-wide disruption of the manufacturing supply chains. In Nakhon Sawan, the sandbag barrier protecting the city was breached, resulting in rapid flooding of the city. Hundreds of patients had to be transferred out of Ayutthaya and Nakhon Sawan Regional Hospitals by boat as water levels rose over the hospital floors and power supplies and life support systems were disrupted.

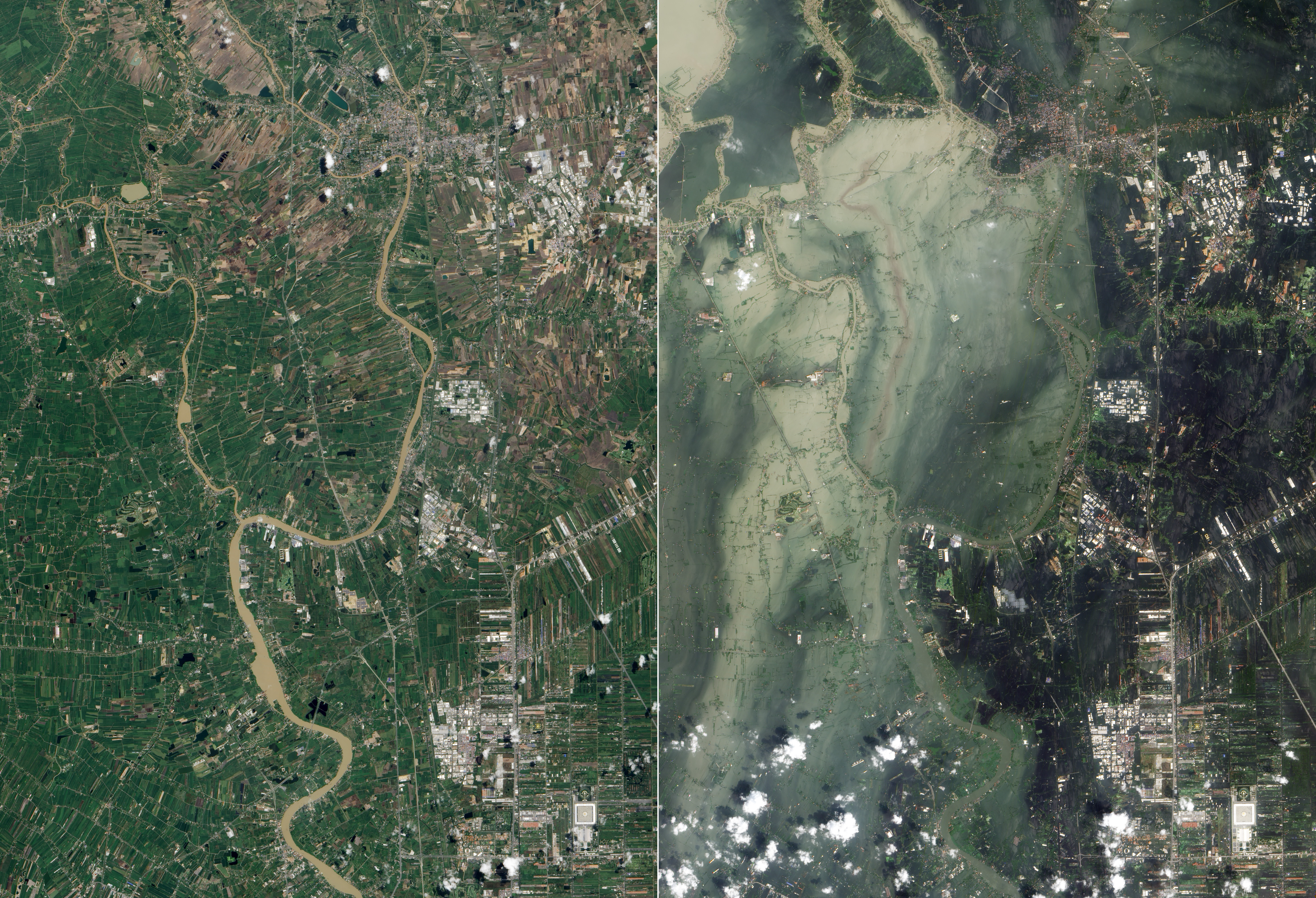
Flooding in Ayutthaya and Pathum Thani Provinces in October (right), compared to before the flooding in July (left)

=== Northeast ===
The Mekong, and its major tributaries Mae Mun and Mae Chi all experienced flooding. In Khon Kaen Province alone, floods destroyed close to 350,000 350,000 rai (56,000 ha; 220 sq mi) of land, stranding 315 families of Mai Si Wilai village in the middle of the swollen Nong Kong Kaew Lake in Chonnabot District, while in Phra Lap municipality on the outskirts of Khon Kaen city, over 700 displaced residents of Phra Kheu village called the shoulder of a provincial highway home. The provincial Department of Disaster Prevention and Mitigation, normally allocated 50 million Thai baht, was granted an extra 50 million for 2011 and had spent over 80 million by the end of October 2011.

=== South ===
Significant flooding occurred in late-2011 in Thailand's southern provinces. Nine provinces were affected by flash flooding owing to rains that occurred in November 2011. Saba Yoi, Khuan Niang, Rattaphum, and Singha Nakhon Districts were declared disaster zones after flood waters as deep as five meters covered nearly all areas. More than 159 small and key roads were impassable. Ten other districts were feared at risk of inundation and more rains were expected. Coastal areas in the south were also battered by high waves.

== Flooding in and around Bangkok ==
Share of each of Bangkok's 154 sub-districts mapped under water in 2011, from GISTDA flood maps

As floodwaters drained southwards from Ayutthaya, Bangkok was becoming seriously threatened by mid-October. In Pathum Thani Province bordering Bangkok to the north, continuous efforts to reinforce and repair sandbag flood walls were undertaken to prevent the Chao Phraya and Rangsit Canals from overflowing into Bangkok. Several districts in eastern Bangkok which lie outside Bangkok's flood wall, as well as parts of the surrounding Nonthaburi, Pathum Thani, Chachoengsao, and Nakhon Pathom Provinces, became flooded as water was diverted from the Chao Phraya to the Nakhon Nayok River and outlying canals.

As flood barriers in Pathum Thani failed, even more industrial estates as well as suburban residential areas became flooded. Parts of the Phahonyothin Highway leading out of Bangkok became inaccessible, causing severe traffic jams on alternative routes. Disruption of a barrier protecting the Khlong Prapa water supply canal early on 20 October allowed floodwaters to enter the canal and rapidly flow down to Sam Sen in central Bangkok, overflowing and flooding several areas along the banks. Although the breach was controlled, residents panicked and illegally parked cars on flyovers and parts of the elevated expressway.

The entire Rangsit campus of Thammasat University in Pathum Thani, north of Bangkok, serving as the largest evacuation centre, was flooded with two meters of water. This led to the school's final exams to be postponed three times.

As the situation continued, several floodgates controlling the Rangsit/Raphiphat canal system became overwhelmed and were forced to release water towards more residential areas. Residents of several districts of Bangkok, especially those bordering Pathum Thani, were told to prepare for flooding. 15 October, saw the beginning of what would be the total inundation of Muang Ake and Rangsit University. The Rangsit gymnasium served as the main means of exit from the town for those who did not have ability to leave on boat or four-wheel drive. An army truck transferred many to the Mo Chit bus station.

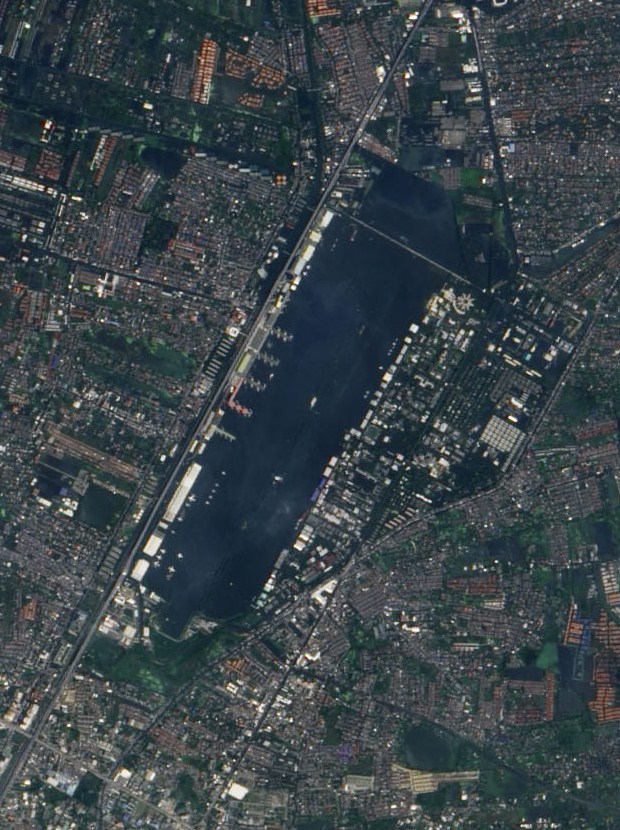
Submerged runway complex of Don Mueang Airport

The Chao Phraya River watershed drains an area of 157,924 square kilometres (60,975 sq mi). This entire area drains towards Bangkok and eventually empties into the sea. The Chao Phraya River itself, and pumping stations around Bangkok drain approximately 420,000,000 square metres (4.5×10^{9} sq ft) per day. However, the releases from the dams upstream of Bangkok coupled with additional rainfall, led to estimates that 16,000,000,000 cubic metres (5.7×10^{11} cu ft) of flood waters must be drained. The flow headed towards Bangkok equated to 16 cubic kilometres (3.8 cu mi). Thailand's Royal Irrigation Department predicted, provided there is no new rain, that it would take 30–45 days for this quantity of water to reach the sea.

Until water flows out to sea, it must go somewhere. This meant flooding on unprotected low-lying land. The amount of land inundated, and the height of peak flood waters was difficult to project for three reasons:

- The exact amount of flood water flowing towards Bangkok was an estimate.
- Flood waters flowing into the Bangkok area didn't arrive all at the same time.
- The expanse of land area that flood waters can occupy before reaching the sea is variable depending on how well barriers hold.

=== Timeline of protecting downtown Bangkok ===
- 6 November 2011 – Khomsan Maleesee, of the KMITL's Faculty of Engineering, stated, "The promise that the 20 districts in Bangkok that remain dry would not flood was now hardly credible." Other experts disagreed. On 1 November 2011 flooding in downtown Bangkok was seen as "unlikely" according to Dr Anond Snidvongs.
- 8 November 2011 – Todd Pitman, writing for the Associated Press reported: "Top officials and experts have given varying estimates of how much Bangkok would flood and how long the threat would loom over the city."
- 9 November 2011 – Flooding still had not reached downtown Bangkok, however, yet another dire prediction was made. This one was by Graham Catterwell in The Nation. While he conceded that it is hard to get a clear picture and he hopes flooding will not occur, that a citywide deluge is inevitable.
- According to Catterwell's prediction made 9 November 2011. "Parts of central eastern Bangkok—notably (in sequence) Bang Kapi, Ramkhamhaeng Road, Srinakharin Road, and Phetburi Road—look sure to be under water by early next week. After Phetburi Road goes under, it will not take long for these waters to flow to Sukhumvit and the rest of downtown Bangkok."
- Also on 9 November 2011 Flood Relief Operations Command (FROC) director, Justice Minister Pracha Promnok, stated, "water was moving underground through the city's sewers" and he could not say if the heart of the capital and Rama 2 Road would be inundated. Rama 2 Road as of 9 November 2011 was the last remaining route open to southern Thailand and vital to supply cities with goods made in the Bangkok area.
- 10 November 2011 – Public official Chavalit Chatararatt, in a live televised analysis, predicted that Bangkok would be dry by 20 November 2011 provided all conditions were right.
- 10 November 2011 – The Thai Irrigation Department reported Bangkok flood waters could be drained in 11 days. Spokesman Mr Boonsanong dismissed reports the city could be hit by more water from the north. Floodwater was described as being 1 km (0.62 mi) from Rama 2 Road and the situation "hard to predict".
- 12 November 2011 – Prime Minister Yingluck said that overall the situation in Bangkok was improving. However, "she declined to say how far the flood water would stray into inner Bangkok and whether the Bangchan Industrial Estate will be safe." This question required more evaluation and that effectiveness of flood control efforts was not a certainty. Drainage in western Bangkok required improvement and the coming high tides of mid-November were still a concern.
- 14 November 2011 – In apparent direct defiance of Prime Minister Yingluck, in Don Mueang District about 200 residents removed sand bags from a barrier that was described as one of the last lines of defense preventing water from flowing into Bangkok's upper districts.
- 14 and 18 November 2011 – More areas of big bag walls protecting unflooded areas of Bangkok were torn down by up to 2,000 residents tired of high flood waters in their area. Jate Sopitpongstorn, advisor to Bangkok's governor, said "It's a big concern because there is such a large amount of water yet to come in."
- 22 November 2011 – Siri Suparathit of the Rangsit University Center on Climate Change and Disaster reported steadily decreasing levels of flood waters in most areas around Bangkok and that even if the big bag wall was breached there "will be no problem". However, an estimated 20 million cubic meters of water per day still overflowed the Chao Phraya River and kept some areas north of downtown Bangkok flooded into December 2011.
- 27 November 2011 – Many neighborhoods in outer Bangkok remained inundated. Residents in flooded areas were coping with stagnant waters that had become breeding grounds for swarms of insects.
- 28 November 2011 – Downtown Bangkok appeared to have been successfully defended from inundation and flood waters in most areas were draining. Residents in areas that remained flooded grew impatient. Sandbag walls were sabotaged and sluice gate levels changed. Residents in some areas were said to be "poised to revolt".

== Mitigation and relief efforts ==
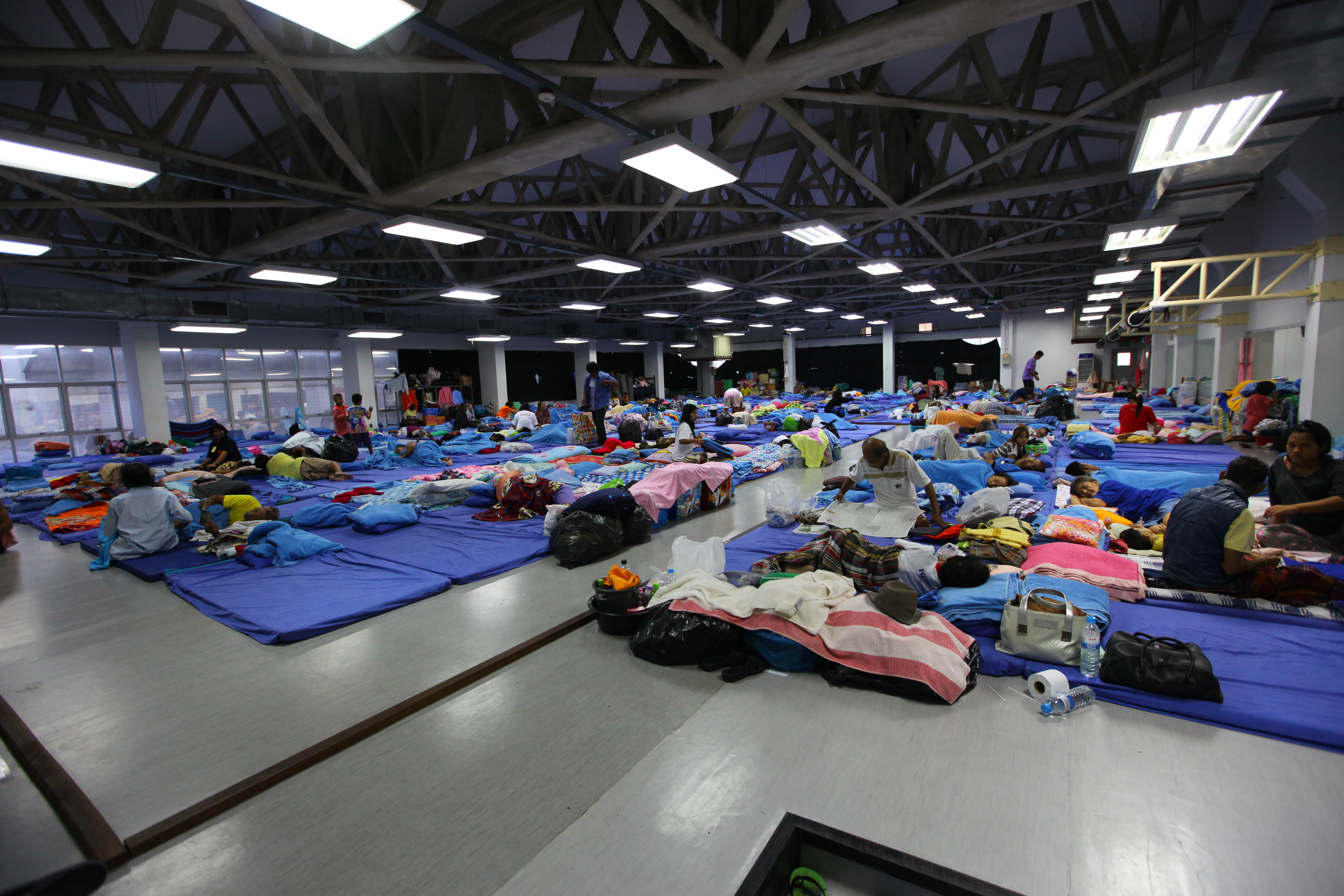
Temporary shelter was provided at stadiums, universities, schools and government buildings.

Centralized flood monitoring and relief operations began in mid-August. Prime Minister Yingluck Shinawatra, appointed in early-August, made tours of flooded provinces beginning 12 August and assigned cabinet members and members of parliament to visit affected people, pledging support to local administration organizations. The 24/7 Emergency Operation Center for Flood, Storm and Landslide was set up on 20 August under the Disaster Prevention and Mitigation Department of the Ministry of Interior to coordinate warning and relief efforts. The government also allocated extra flood-relief budgets to the affected provinces. The prime minister also pledged to invest in long-term prevention projects, including the construction of drainage canals.

The armed forces were mobilized to distribute aid to affected people, and civilian groups and organizations were also involved, with volunteers packing sustenance kits and delivering aid to some areas. A Flood Relief Operations Center (FROC) was set up at Don Mueang Airport to coordinate the delivery of aid, superseding the Emergency Operation Center because it could not exercise adequate authority. The stadium at Rangsit Campus of Thammasat University served as a shelter for evacuees, mostly from Ayutthaya. However, many people in the flooded areas refused to leave their homes for fear of looting.

China, Japan, the Philippines, the United States, and New Zealand pledged support and assistance for relief operations.

On 16 October 2011, the USS George Washington (CVN-73) aircraft carrier, as well as several other United States Navy ships were deployed to Thailand to assist in relief work. It was not clear to the US government whether or not the Thai government required US naval assistance due to mixed signals from the Thai government. An anonymous US defense official said that they were "ready to help but we haven't got a request". Then Captain John Kirby of the USS Mustin, docked at Port Laem Chabang on a routine visit, said Thailand asked the warship to prolong its stay at the port for up to six days for assistance in aerial surveillance of the extent the flooding. The Pentagon said two Seahawk helicopters aboard would conduct the reconnaissance.

=== Disputes ===
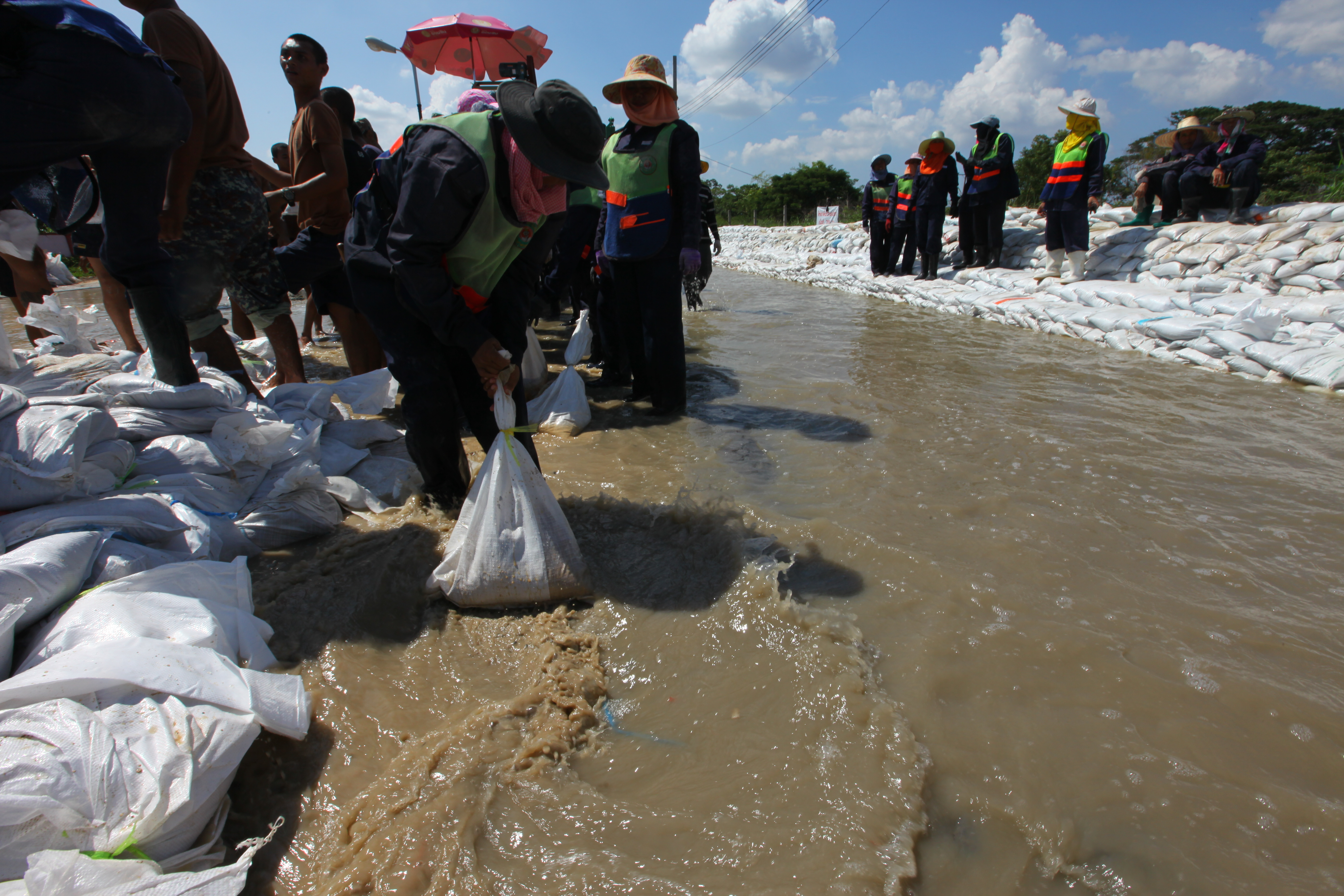
Sandbag barriers were constructed to control flooding, with limited success.

At the national level a debate raged as to whether the dams that store waters upstream of Bangkok were mismanaged.

The size and scope of the 2011 flood can, in part, be attributed to the low rainfall of the 2010 monsoon season. Dam levels hit record lows in June 2010. The evidence shows that early in the season the dams collected large amounts of water building reserves and buffering early flooding. The scale of the rainfall of 2011 is evidenced by the quantity of water collected behind Bhumibol Dam. Over eight billion cubic meters of water were collected in three months, filling this dam to capacity. Once at capacity, continuing rains forced officials to increase flows from the dams despite increasing flooding and this led to accusations that the dams were mismanaged early in the monsoon season. However, the counter argument is that had the monsoon season for 2011 been short and the dam levels not built up, that even lower levels than 2010 would have been mismanagement too.

As the flooding threat to Bangkok increased, discontent with the government response and the FROC mounted. The government was criticized for underestimating the extent of flooding, giving mixed or conflicting information, and not giving adequate warnings. Failure of governmental units to share data and cooperate were reported as contributing to the problem. FROC administrators and the Bangkok Metropolitan Administration (BMA) were criticized for playing politics and refusing to cooperate at the expense of the general population.

Copying the technique suggested by King Bhumibol Adulyadej to help quicken the flow of water through the much shallower Khlong Lad Pho canal, Yingluck placed hundreds of boats in the Chao Phraya River to accelerate the flow and drainage of the basin. Yingluck was criticized for this by Democrat Party spokesman Chavanond Intarakomalyasut, who called the operation a "waste of time" as there were high sea tide at the time. Smith Dharmasarojana, former Director-General of the Meteorological Department and Chairman of the National Disaster Warning Council Foundation, also criticized the operation, claiming that "accelerating boats in the middle of the wide Chao Phraya River is a waste because they propel only the water on the surface." However, others countered that boats wouldn't move forward unless they propelled water backwards. The middle ground to this dispute is that the overall power of the Chao Phraya River is tremendous compared to the additional power added to it by the engines of the boats. Later on 5 December 2011, the king was present at a public ceremony held on his 84th birthday anniversary, attended by senior public officers and broadcast live throughout the nation. He gave a public speech a part of which was: "...Especially, the people are now suffering from the inundation. Every person is obliged to together and without delay cope with this public danger. And all projects I have suggested, such as the project on permanent management of water, are merely an advice, not an order. The persons concerned must think twice [about them]..."

Sukhumbhand Paribatra, a member of the opposition party and Democrat Governor of Bangkok, apparently seized on the flood as an opportunity to grandstand and made comments such as "please believe me and only me", and charged that 800,000 sandbags provided by the federal government were of questionable construction. "Once I saw these paper bags I was in shock", he said, refusing the sandbags. In response, the government released photos of the bags, construction details, and suggested that the governor was perhaps ill-advised by a third party in an attempt to allow him to save some face.

The use of flood barriers resulted in several disputes between people on the different sides. Those on the flooded side were angry that they were unfairly affected, and often attempted to sabotage the barriers, sometimes resulting in armed confrontation. Farmers in Phichit Province, among others, fought over the maintenance of sandbag barriers and sluice gates. Residents in areas outlying Bangkok are also dissatisfied that their homes are flooded while Bangkok was protected. Arguments over the construction of the controversial Kaeng Suea Ten Dam also arose.

Local resistance to the building and maintenance of flood barriers disrupted work in several instances. Residents in some areas sabotaged barriers and threatened government workers at gunpoint.

=== Issues with car owners ===
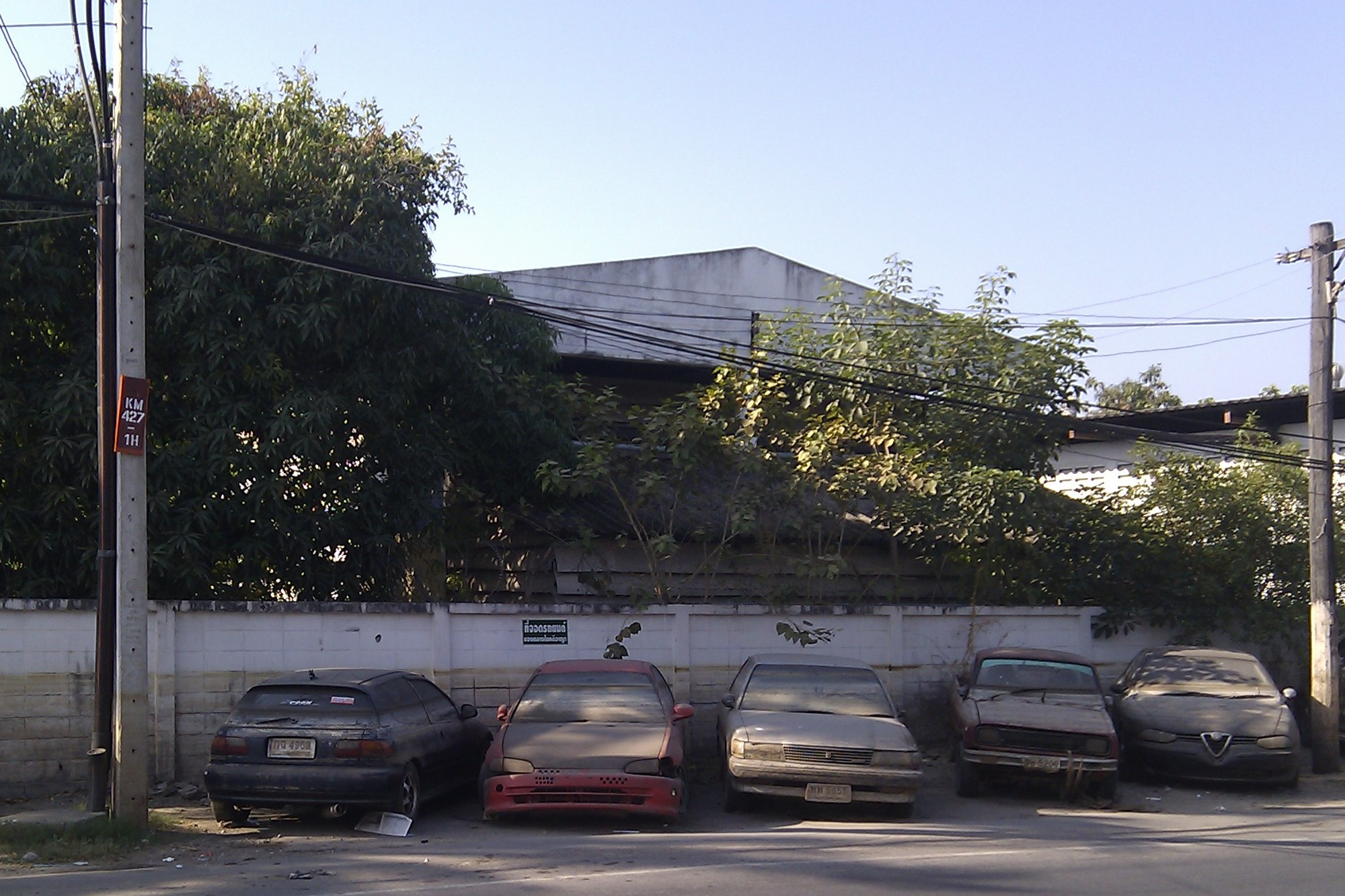
Abandoned and wrecked cars when the flood ended

Once the flood arrived at Pathum Thani Province, the media presented flood-related news more frequently and made car owners in Bangkok and nearby precincts panic. Many designated car parks were full at that time. Many parked their vehicles on expressways, at intersections, or anywhere they perceived would not get flooded. This aggravated traffic problems and there were several unreported accidents. No deaths were reported.

=== Communication deficiencies ===
One notable error in communications between Thai media and foreign companies was the lack of information in English. According to the Bangkok Post, Kobkarn Wattanavrangkul, who was the chairperson for Toshiba Thailand at the time, commented that information received had been inaccurate, with different government agencies even releasing conflicting information at times. Other foreign investors shared this anxiety. Another notable example of insufficient communication was with Rohm Integrated Systems, one of the largest Japanese semiconductor manufacturers who had a manufacturing plant in Navanakorn. The company received very little information about the flood and could not move critical equipment in time.

== Damage ==
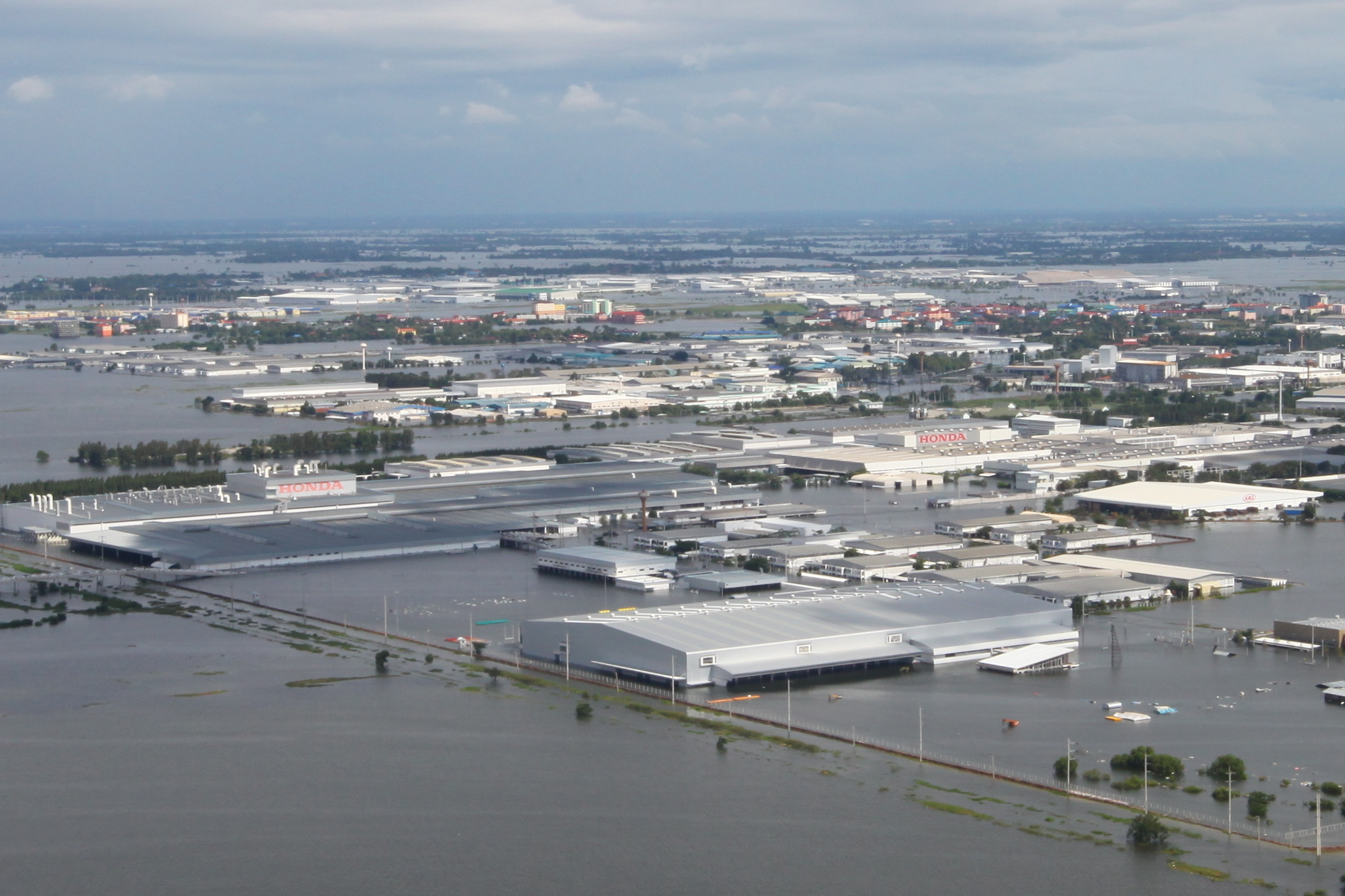
Industrial estates were badly affected by flooding, resulting in manufacturing disruptions and global shortages.

The flooding has been described as "the worst flooding yet in terms of the amount of water and people affected". As of 6 November, flooding affected 3,151,224 people from 1,154,576 families, with 506 deaths and two missing persons reported by the 24/7 Emergency Operation Center for Flood, Storm and Landslide (EOC). Damage estimates of at least 185 billion baht in the latest estimate by the Federation of Thai Industry (central region) which includes 95 billion baht damage on Thai industry, 25 billion baht damage to Thai agriculture, and 65 billion baht damage to housing. A large part of the damage stemmed from the effect on the manufacturing industry, with 930 factories in 28 provinces affected, including several industrial estates in Ayutthaya and Pathum Thani Provinces. The flooding has been estimated to result in a decrease of 0.6–0.9 percent in economic growth. Schools, 1,053 of which were affected as of 19 September, were forced to end the term early.

Employment was hurt when factories flooded and workers were laid off or fired. Not all factories were expected to reopen, causing significant long-term job loss in central Thailand.

Thailand accounts for about 30 percent of global trade in rice and 25 percent of the main crop was not expected to survive the floods. On the other side of the world, rice farmers in Arkansas, usually accounting for 42 percent of US output, also were flooded early that year, and then faced drought, reducing their crop by 32 percent according to the USDA. Combined, these two events will have a global impact on rice prices. In Thailand, where rice farmers do not typically have much reserve capital, effects on farmers will be felt the greatest since they lost both their investment in the current crop and must wait to earn money when flood waters recede before planting a new one.

=== Damages to industrial estates and global supply shortages ===
On 8 October 2011 the 10-metre high water barrier in Nikom Rojna Industrial Estate, which housed many manufacturing plants, collapsed. The strong current interfered with reconstruction efforts and resulted in the area being non-operational. One of the major manufacturing plants, Honda, was left virtually inaccessible.

Thailand is the world's second-largest producer of hard disk drives, supplying approximately 25 percent of the world's production. Many of the factories that made hard disk drives were flooded, including Western Digital's, leading some industry analysts to predict future worldwide shortages of hard disk drives. Western Digital was able to get one of their plants, flooded on 15 October 2011, restored and operating on 30 November 2011. The company's flood-related costs were estimated at between US$225–275 million; however, an insurance claim of US$50 million for property damage and another claim for business interruption would help lower the net impact. As a result, most hard disk drive prices almost doubled globally, which took approximately two years to recover. Due to the price increase, Western Digital reported a 31 percent revenue increase and a more than doubled profit for fiscal year 2012.

=== Impacts of flooding on other countries ===
The economies of other countries were significantly impacted by the flood. The country that was hardest hit was Japan. Japanese firms with plants in Thailand included Toyota, Honda, Hitachi, and Canon. One analyst predicted the profits of one firm, Toyota, may be cut by ¥200 billion (US$2.5 billion). Worker incomes in Thailand and Japan were impacted.

For some firms and countries the impact was not all negative. For example, Thailand is a major exporter of seafood and countries like India have firms that gained as they stepped to fill in the void.

Thailand's flood helped contribute to a total estimated US$259 billion in economic losses for the first nine months of 2011. These losses represented 80 percent of the world's total economic losses and the insurance industry responded by raising rates in some areas between 50 and 200 percent or by not accepting new clients in Asia.

=== Damage to tourism ===
In early-November 2011, the Governor of the Tourism Authority of Thailand (TAT), Suraphon Svetasreni, projected a combined loss as high as US$825 million owing to reduced international and national tourism. TAT projected that between 220,000 and 300,000 visitors would cancel their trips.

Tourism numbers had been running higher than 2010 until the end of October 2011. Arrivals at Bangkok's airport were up 6.7 percent compared to October 2010 and same month last year, Phuket arrivals were up 28.5 percent.

The TAT wanted tourists to know tourist destinations such as Chiang Rai, Chiang Mai, Mae Hong Son, Pai, Kanchanaburi, Ratchaburi, Pattaya, Sattahip, Chonburi, Chantaburi, Phetchaburi, Hua Hin, Cha-am, Phuket, Krabi, Phang Nga, Surat Thani, Trang, Satun, Hat Yai, Rayong, Trat, Chumphon, Ranong, Ko Pha Ngan, and Ko Samui had not been affected by flooding at all. If a section of Bangkok became temporarily inaccessible, visitors still had other options.

Concerns about the ability to continue food supplies to some areas was evident in the media. Some retailers in Phuket were scrambling in October 2011 to establish alternatives when their regular distribution centers were flooded. An added concern became even more pressing when it became clear on 7 November 2011 that Rama II Road, the last open link to the south, was expected to flood. To offset this risk, plans were announced to mobilize teams to reclaim Highway 340 that in parts was under up to a meter of water.

In December 2011, the Miss Earth 2011 beauty pageant was set to be held in Bangkok, but was relocated to the Philippines.

=== Sanitation concerns ===
Effects of the trash and sewage in flood waters were expected to peak when waters subsided, leaving behind stagnant pools of water. A spokesman for UNICEF encouraged everyone to stay out of the water as much as possible. Since a household sanitation system does not operate under flood water, individuals who remained in flooded areas exposed themselves to risks and increased risks for those living downstream by continuing to generate more sewage and trash in waters carried downstream.

== In popular culture ==
- Modernine TV had discussed on the 2011 Thailand floods on TimeLine, 6 November 2017, in "2011 - The City that was Submerged".

== See also ==
- 1997 Southeast Asian haze
- 2004 Indian Ocean earthquake and tsunami
- 2010 Thai floods
- 2011 Southeast Asian floods
- 2011 Southern Thailand floods
- Floods in Thailand
