= 2010 Thailand–Malaysia floods =

2010 Thailand and Malaysia floods
- Date: 10 October 2010 – 19 November 2010
- Location: Thailand and Malaysia
- Deaths: 232 in Thailand; 4 in Malaysia
- Property damage: ฿50 billion (US$1.68 billion)

A series of flash floods hit different areas of Thailand and Malaysia in 2010. Separate but related floods began in Northeast and Central Thailand (per the six-region definition) in early October due to abnormally late monsoon moisture over the Bay of Bengal, overflowed the Chao Phraya where the rivers meet, and affected Bangkok, and in the South were triggered by a tropical depression about two weeks later, and were later aggravated by related La Niña monsoon rains. Floods subsequently occurred in the Malaysian states of Kedah and Perlis in November 2010.

Although flooding is a common and annual occurrence in this part of the world, a combination of inadequate drainage and higher-than-average rainfall in October and November 2010 caught the nation off guard and led to disaster. The death toll in Thailand stands at 232 people. According to the Thai government data, the floods affected nearly 7 million people in more than 25,000 villages, mostly by destruction of property, livelihood, and infrastructure. The government announced that 38 provinces were hit by floods from 1 October until 13 November, and waters had receded in eight provinces, leaving 30 provinces still affected, including 12 in the southern region of the country.

== Flooding ==
=== Thailand ===
As heavy monsoon rains pummelled Thailand, flooding began. In the beginning, the flooding was normal and not very serious but it later worsened into a disaster. For almost a month the area remained flooded and then the waters claimed their very first victims. The southern parts of the nation were in bigger trouble as a tropical depression that was to become Cyclone Jal hit the country, increasing the impact of floods by packing strong winds of about 50 kilometres per hour (31 mph) with it. Many areas were flooded with water up to 50 centimetres (20 in) deep. The local government announced that they would be giving 5,000 baht to each household affected by flooding and up to 100,000 baht would be spent for repairs. As floodwaters in the north receded, floods in the south worsened and as a result, many patients were evacuated from the hospitals in northern Thailand and new patients were brought from southern Thailand where the conditions were much worse. Due to severe flooding caused by the tropical depression, power supplies were disrupted, causing blackouts. As a result, one person died.

Thousands of Thai citizens were stranded as the floods devastated their homes and washed out towns. At that time, the worst fear was the decline in the national rubber export. All banks in the region were closed. As fears of a decrease in rubber exports increased, prices of rubber were lowered. A few days later, the rubber factory regained its profit as the yield turned out to be better. Meanwhile, the death toll in the nation rose to 104 as much of the country was flooded and there were not many places to evacuate the people. Many other banks in southern Thailand were later closed. According to officials, the severe flooding did not affect the Thailand Stock exchange as it was expected. Thousands of the residents fled from Thailand seeing the deadly impact of the monsoon and the tropical depression.

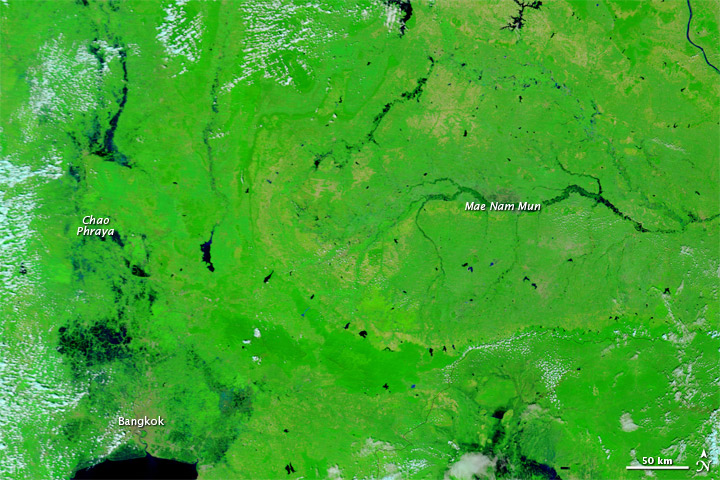
Thailand seen from a NASA satellite shortly after the flooding began

Many more tourists were said to have been trapped in Thailand as rail and air transport services were suspended. Several attempts were made to rescue the stranded people in Thailand. The Samui airport was closed temporarily due to heavy downpours and poor visibility. About 100 foreign tourists were reported to be stranded on Angthong Island because of high waves. Thailand's prime minister Abhisit Vejjajiva called the flooding in the south that displaced thousands of people "one of the worst natural calamities" to hit the country. Many districts are under as much as three metres of water. One resident has been electrocuted during the flooding. Officials said a woman was forced to give birth in her room in an apartment block as the high floodwaters prevented her from being taken to hospital. Exports of electronic goods and automotive parts to Malaysia have been partially suspended as the Sadao border checkpoint has been closed because Hat Yai has been hard hit by flooding as the logistics operators explained. The shipments of consumer goods, raw materials, and petrol between Bangkok and the South have been delayed by many hours, raising concerns that shortages may occur if a new storm hits the region in the next few days. Prakit Chinamourphong, president of the Thai Hotels Association (THA), stated that it was too early to evaluate tourism damage from the floods as many areas of the town could not be reached or contacted. Suchart Sirankanokkul, the president of the THA Southern Chapter, explained that many people were stranded as water levels had reached the roofs of some properties. The flooding this year is the most severe since November 2000, when the inundation of Hat Yai and its 16 neighbouring districts resulted in 20 deaths. Businesses and individuals who help with the donations or who have mobilised funding support for flood relief operations will also be entitled to the tax cut. Revenue Department director-general Satit Rungkasiri explains that the tax cut would apply to donations and flood damage between September and December.

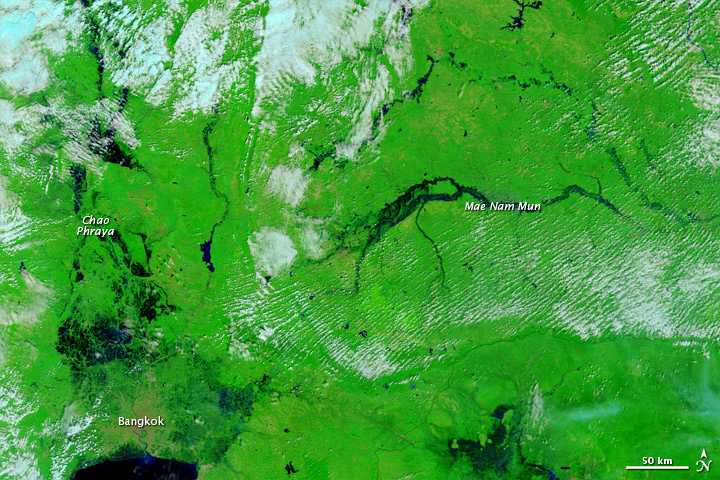
Thailand seen from a NASA satellite a few weeks after the flooding began

The State Railway of Thailand suspended services on eight routes due to flooded tracks in the Songkhla area. A school director in southern Songkhla province pleaded for emergency help for some 120 Muslim students stranded in a mosque in flood-hit Hat Yai district. Yusuf Nima, the director of Hat Yai Witthayakhan School, said the students were stranded at the Dinul Islam Mosque since Tuesday after flash floods had hit Hat Yai. Thai troops scrambled to reach thousands of people stranded after flash floods swept through a major southern city, as the government expressed optimism it could reach all those trapped. Rising waters began to inundate Hat Yai, a city of more than 150,000 in Songkhla province, late Monday after days of heavy downpours, affecting tens of thousands of people, possibly including foreign tourists. Flooding has hit 48 of Thailand's 77 provinces, with the death toll rising by three to 107 people, the Department of Disaster Prevention and Mitigation said in a statement today. The waters have impacted a tenth of the country's 66 million people and damaged more than 3 percent of total agricultural land. Thailand's meteorological department said the storm was moving west, away from Thailand, but warned of 13-foot waves in some coastal areas and the possibility of landslides and flash floods for residents in low-lying areas.

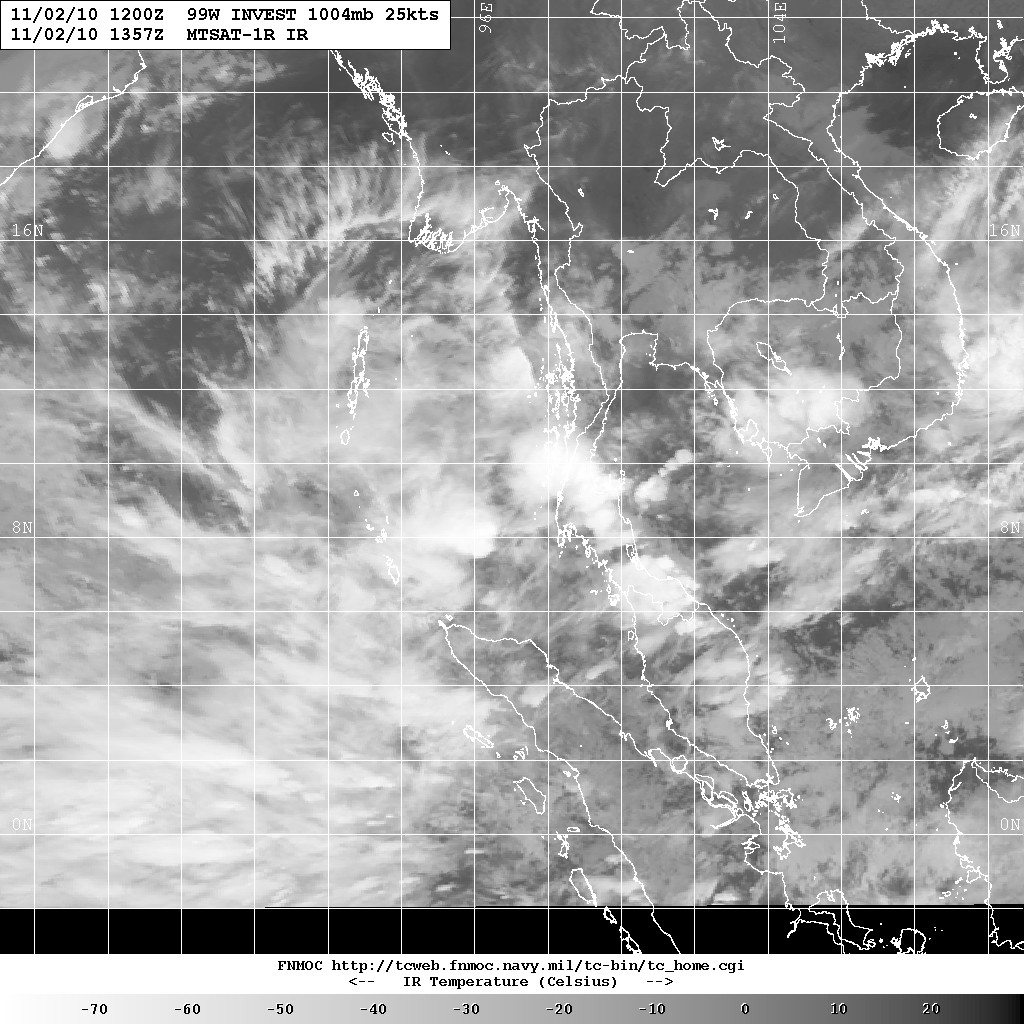
The tropical depression known to have caused the flooding in southern Thailand

The Finance Ministry says flooding this year, which has also hit northeastern and central provinces, could cut economic growth by 0.2 percentage point. In Chumphon, a navy team was reported to have rescued nine people, including four children, trapped in a house near a dam construction site in tambon Suan Taeng of Lamae district. The government's Disaster Prevention and Mitigation Department said 122 people have died and nearly 6 million residents in 39 provinces in the northern, central, eastern, and northeastern regions had been affected by two weeks of heavy floods in October. Rows of cars submerged in the floodwaters were being removed from the streets and piles of trash were taken away by trucks. Despite relief efforts pouring in, heavily flooded Hat Yai district in Songkhla province remained in crisis, with high flood waters in urban areas and widespread effects reported on the outskirts. The Information and Communications Technology Ministry reported damage to 80 of its 200 towers after generators attached to them were flooded. There have been no official figures on flood damage but an initial estimate, from Hat Yai Mayor Phrai Phatthana, cited 80 per cent of urban areas and 30,000 households affected, and 10,000 residents stranded in their homes. The Bangkok Metropolitan Administration has delivered 1,000 survival kits and 17 flat-bottom boats to Na Thawee and hard-hit Hat Yai district. The Thai Red Cross Society has set up mobile kitchens to feed flood victims in Ayutthaya, mainly serving breakfast to monks in the morning, lunch to relief workers, and dinner to villagers.

Education Minister Chinnaworn Boonyakiat on Wednesday confirmed 1,186 schools in the southern provinces have been affected by flooding—555 in Songkhla, 350 in Pattani, seven in Yala, 28 in Narathiwat, 150 in Phatthalung, 63 in Nakhon Si Thammarat, 20 in Trang, and 13 in Satun. Buildings encroaching over waterways were found to have obstructed water flows. The Royal Irrigation Department would speed up dredging canals and build more reservoirs to retain water. Thailand's only aircraft carrier has been converted into a floating kitchen, to airlift hot food to people affected by massive flooding in the south. Last month, the kingdom's central provinces were also flooded by unusually heavy monsoon rains. Commenting on rice prices, the Singapore General Rice Importers Association (SGRIA) said it is keeping prices at the pre-flood levels for now despite a 5 to 10 per cent increase. Singapore imports 65 per cent of its rice from Thailand but it is not clear how much of it is from Hat Yai.

The deluge in Thailand's south – along a peninsula it shares with Malaysia – followed two weeks of heavy floods in October, mostly in central and northeastern Thailand, that killed more than 107 people. Nearly 6 million residents of 38 provinces were affected by October's floods, according to the government's Disaster Prevention and Mitigation Department. As the water recedes, residents and tourists who were trapped in their homes and hotels for almost 48 hours were able to move around yesterday to get food and other supplies. Food was being prepared at several locations including Prince of Songkla University for distribution to those stranded in their homes. At least 100 Singaporeans could have been stuck in southern Thailand due to the floods, said travel agents, with some estimating as many as 400 or more. Singapore's Ministry of Foreign Affairs (MFA) said it was in contact with most of Singaporeans stranded. It said all who contacted the ministry were safe and some were on their way out of Hat Yai.

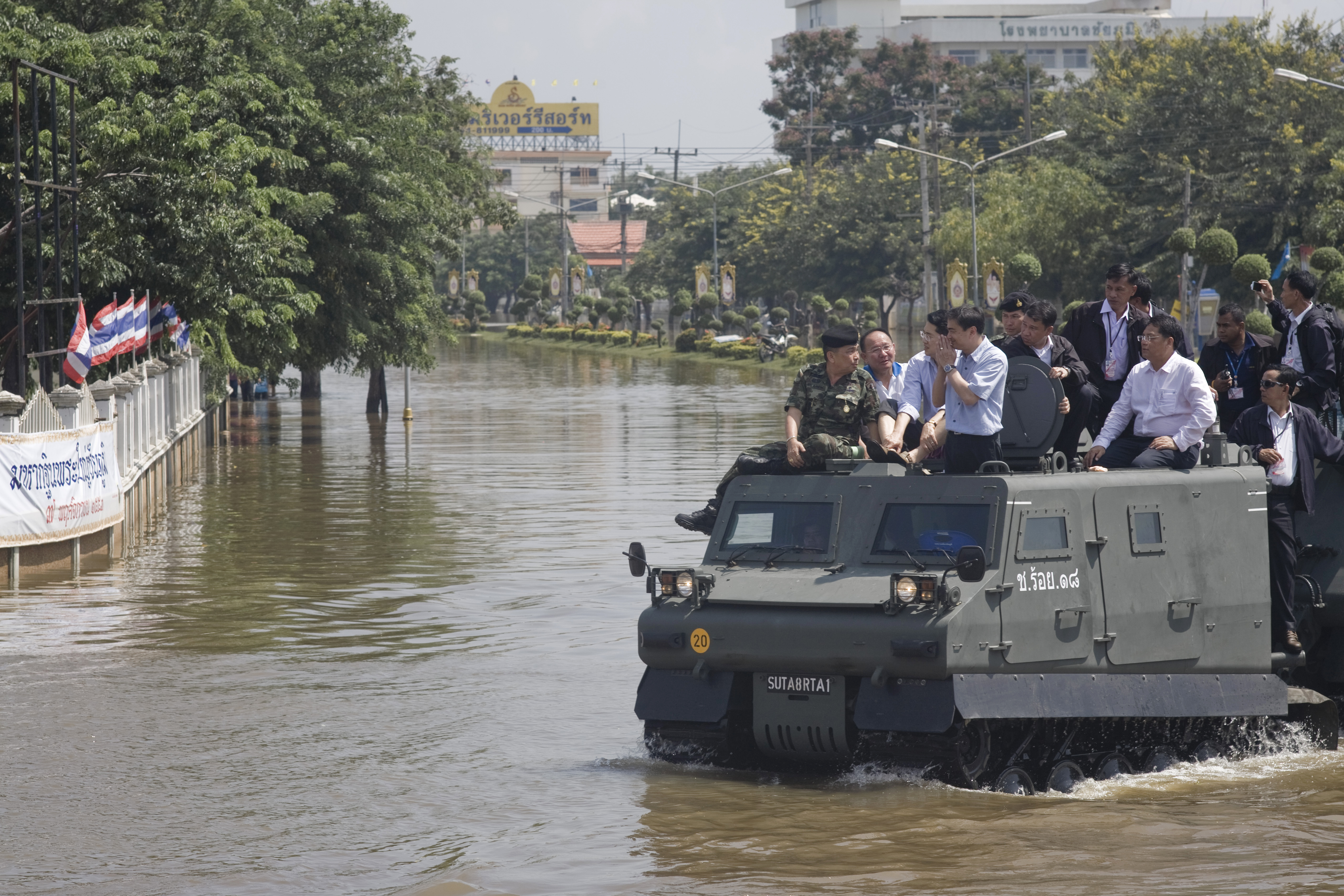
The Prime Minister of Thailand surveying the flooded regions in an armoured vehicle

Prime Minister Abhisit Vejjajiva said the cabinet had agreed to the proposals aimed at helping flood victims. Besides, the cabinet had also agreed to allow the Finance Ministry to divert 4 billion baht from its Strong Thailand budget, in addition to the 20,000 million baht central budget already approved, for the same purpose. As for the 5,000-baht compensation for each flood victim's family, the government would disburse the amount this week, starting in Nakorn Ratchasima Province. The Interior Ministry would be tasked with verifying information on rental houses affected from floods to ensure that compensation would be paid to only those eligible for it.

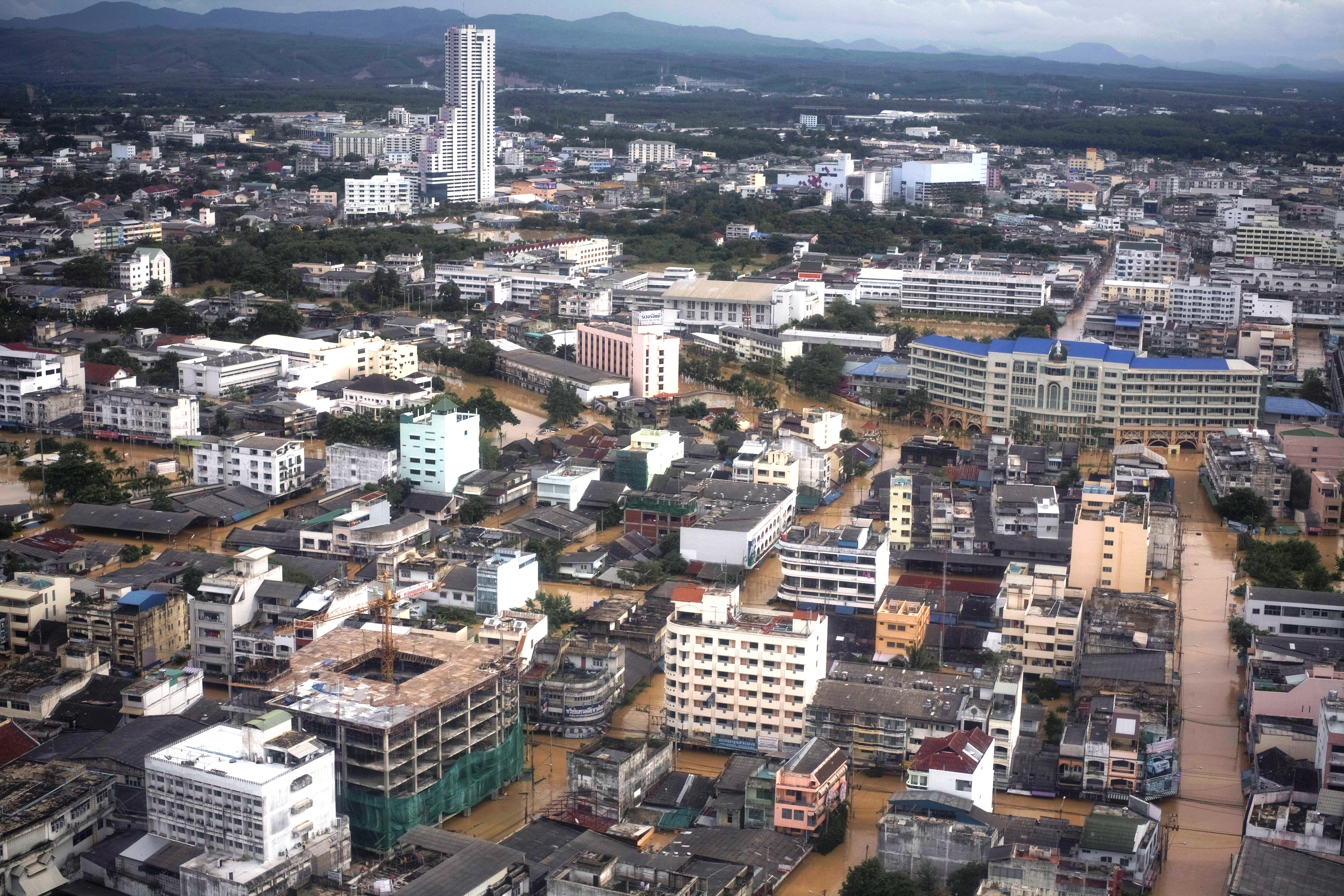
Aerial view of Hat Yai during the floods

On the night of 1 November 2010, after three consecutive days of rain, the provinces of Pattani, Songkhla, and Trang were hit by a Tropical Depression which made landfall directly at Amphoe Mueang Pattani, causing significant damage and destruction. The city of Hat Yai, being located in a basin, received water from the mountains on the outskirts and reported floodwater as high as 2 meters in some locations in the downtown area. Despite early warning by the Thai Meteorological Department, tens of thousands of residents could not be evacuated on time and were trapped in their homes. Those living in one-storey houses needed to escape the floodwater on their rooftops. Meanwhile, rescue and relief efforts to bring food and other necessities to the victims were hampered by the lack of boats and strong currents. The southern provinces, hit by flooding triggered by tropical depression-related rainstorms, reported 43 deaths from 30 Oct to 7 and 12 Nov southern provinces overall have been flooded. The confirmed death toll from the heavy flooding in many provinces since 10 Oct has risen to 215, the Department of Disaster Prevention and Mitigation reported on Saturday morning.

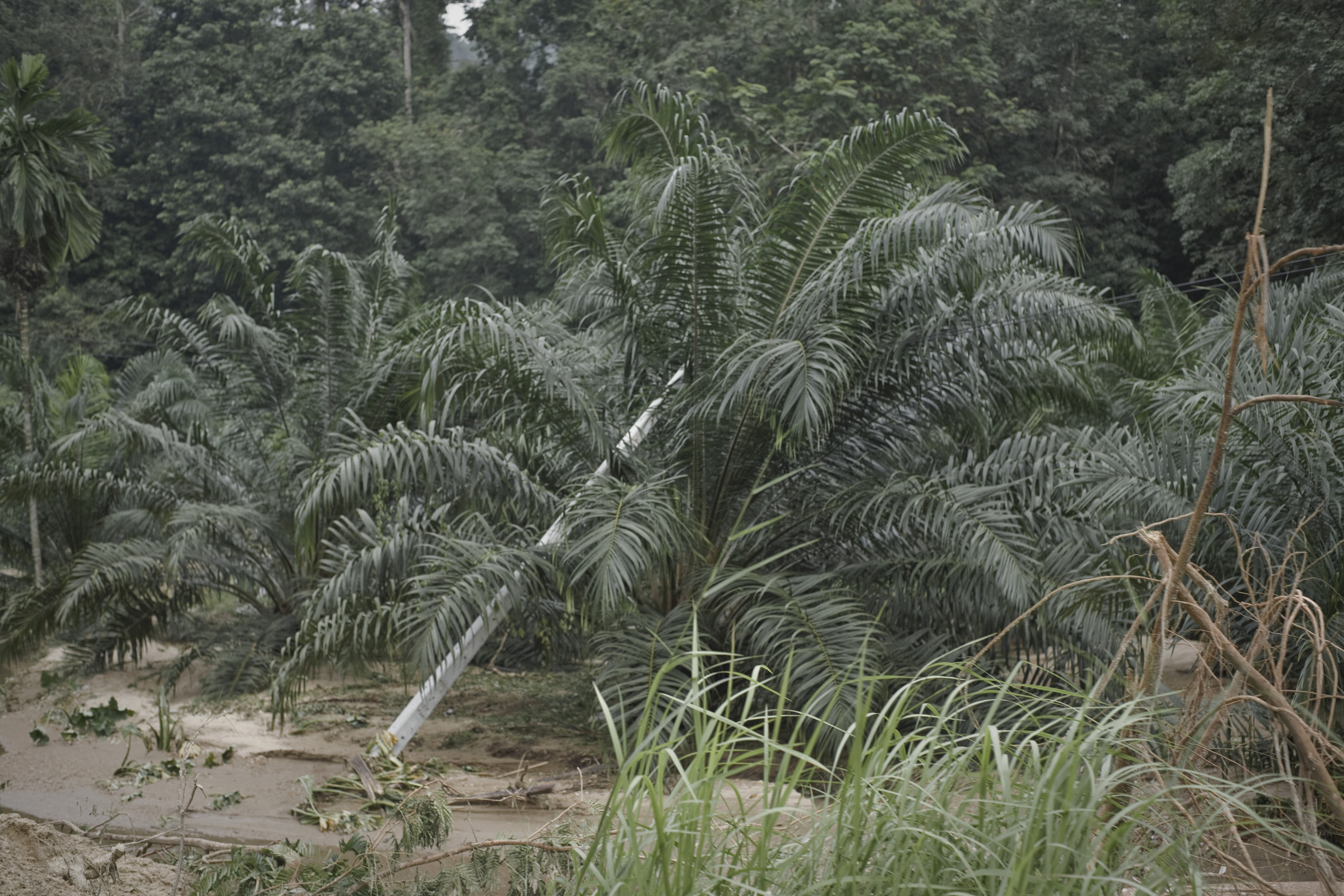
A landslide in Nakhon Si Thammarat, caused by the excessive rains

In conjunction with very high amounts of floodwaters, there is the extra danger of mud or landslides in over 6 thousand villages in fifty-one provinces, twice as much as the number reported 7 years ago. Due to the remote location of the affected area, the emergency packages were prepared in Bangkok and transported approximately 560 miles (900 km) to the southern province of Songkhla, Hat Yai being the provincial capital. ADRA set up a distribution point close to the Prince of Songkla University, an area near Hat Yai that is unaffected by the floods due to higher elevation. As it continued to rain in the South, riverside residents in Chomporn, Suratthani, Nakornsrithammarat, Trang, and Satul have been warned of possible mudslides and flash floods in the next few days.

Their worries emerge as 130 shrimp farms covering 20,000 rai of coastal area in six districts have been damaged by the floods, causing losses worth about 200 million baht. Farmers are concerned shellfish could die all at once, causing up to 2 to 3 billion baht in damage after oyster and cockle farms in coastal areas in Ban Don and Chaiya were invaded by freshwater, said Sila Wandee, chairman of Surat Thai's local fisherman group. The confirmed death toll from floods has risen to 232 on 19 November 2010. The department said a total of 156 people in the North, Northeast, East, and Central Plains and 76 in the South had died in the floodwaters.

=== Malaysia ===
In northern Malaysia, officials said floods caused by heavy monsoon rains have forced more than 10,000 people to evacuate their homes and several schools to close. Another official with the National Flood Monitoring Centre said more than 2,200 people in another northern state, Perlis, were evacuated. Over 36,000 people were transported to relief shelters, while rains and flooding caused two deaths. The floods affected transportation in and around Kedah and Perlis, shutting down rail and closing roads including the North–South Expressway. Alor Setar's Sultan Abdul Halim Airport was also closed after its runway was flooded, leaving helicopters as the only mode of aerial transport into Kedah and Perlis. The floods also contaminated the water supply in Kedah and Perlis, forcing the states to receive supplies from the neighbouring state of Perak.

Rice production, a key industry in Kedah and Perlis, was badly affected by the floods. According to the federal government, over 45,000 hectares of rice fields were damaged in Kedah alone. The government pledged 26 million ringgit in aid to farmers in both states.

The floods killed at least four people in Kedah, including a foreign national. Around 50,000 people were evacuated, the floods even affected the house of Kedah's Chief Minister, Azizan Abdul Razak. In Perlis, the floods submerged over two-thirds of the state's land in water.

The north-eastern state of Kelantan was also affected by the floods, causing the closure of some schools.

== Reactions ==
The floods triggered immediate political fallout in Malaysia. The Federal Minister for Housing and Local Government and Alor Setar MP Chor Chee Heung criticised the Kedah State government (led by the Pan-Malaysian Islamic Party, an opponent of Chor's Barisan Nasional coalition) for what he considered a slow response to the floods and the government's inexperience. Chor's own home in Alor Setar was flooded. Deputy Prime Minister Muhyiddin Yassin claimed the State government had a responsibility to assist victims of the flood. Kedah's Chief Minister Azizan argued that his government's response had been "quick" and that 300,000 ringgit in aid had been committed to the affected areas. Kedah's Sultan Abdul Halim called publicly for politics to be set aside for the purposes of dealing with the floods.

In Thailand, the opposition Puea Thai Party on Friday petitioned the National Anti-Corruption Commission (NACC) to take legal action against Prime Minister Abhisit Vejjajiva, claiming he acted too slowly to counter the effects from the recent flooding, resulting in massive damage to property and many deaths. The petition filed by Puea Thai spokesman Prompong Nopparit accuses the prime minister of malfeasance in violation of Article 157 of the Criminal Code. Mr. Prompong said the prime minister has the administrative power to ensure swift action to prevent and mitigate effects from flooding under Article 4 of the Disaster Prevention and Mitigation Act of 2007, but had not properly exercised his authority.

The floods attracted attention from around the world. The Chinese government intended to provide humanitarian aid and has granted 10 million yuan for the flooded area's restoration. US Secretary of State Hillary Clinton extended her condolences for the loss of life and damage caused by severe flooding throughout Thailand, pledging additional help when needed. Clinton said in a statement that the US Embassy in Bangkok has offered immediate disaster relief assistance following the flooding, and is "working closely" with the Thai government to provide additional help if needed.

== Relief work ==
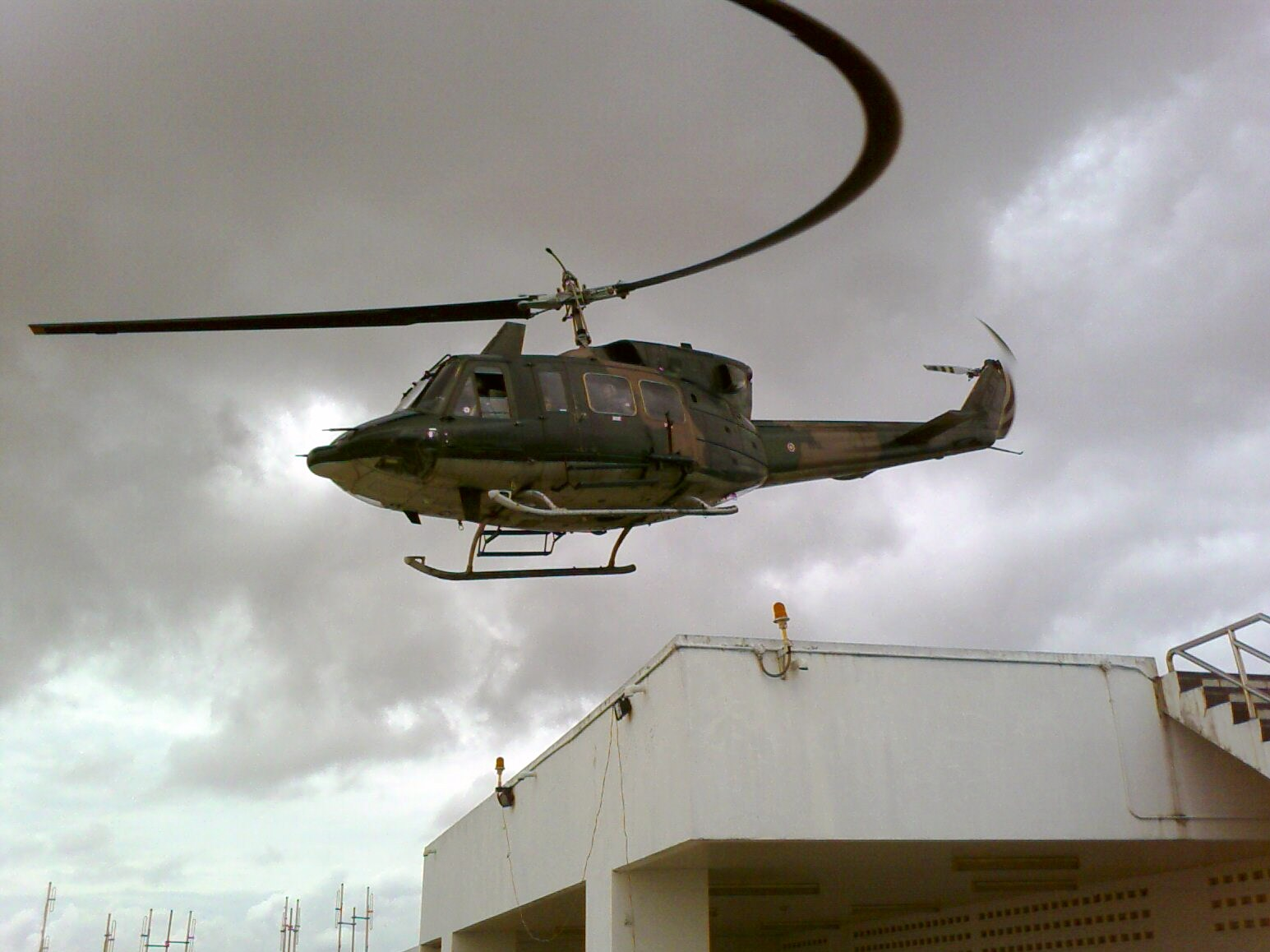
An Armed Forces helicopter delivering supplies to Hat Yai Hospital. Critical patients had to be transferred by helicopter to Songklanagarin Hospital after emergency power supplies failed.

Restoration work has begun to revive the regionally vital Hat Yai commercial district in Thailand's southern province of Songkhla after heavy flooding has receded and local residents gradually are coming out to receive relief packages and buy fresh food supplies. Provincial Electricity Authority (PEA) governor Narongsak Kamales said some parts of Hat Yai started to have electricity since 9:00 pm last night but he warned the residents to carefully check the electrical system before turn on any switch. Law and order has been largely maintained, with constant patrols by police and volunteers, but minor looting was reported and caught on camera after a few similar incidents took place earlier. The Prince of Songkhla University compound has been packed with people seeking help during the crisis, as it served as both a rally and a pick-up point for relief supplies, and its hospital as a medical service centre.

Rail service to the region was partially restored Thursday morning and the airport on Samui island, a popular tourist destination in the Gulf of Thailand, reopened after a temporary shutdown caused by a submerged runway. On the bright side, the research centre predicted the floods would bring seed money back into the economic system as the government would earmark relief funds for flood victims and rehabilitation of the flooded areas. In Hat Yai, many residents were caught off-guard by the flash flood despite evacuation warnings, suggesting either that the cautions were unheard or simply ignored. Urban planning, national irrigation strategies, and flood control systems also need a drastic rethink, particularly when one considers the future threat that climate change and rising sea levels will have on Bangkok and other populated coastal areas in the years to come.

The Thai community in Brunei has been urged to provide humanitarian relief to the victims of the flood-affected areas back home. Thawat, the Acting Ambassador of Thai Embassy said that donations can be given in the form of money or goods such as clothing. As the water level in many areas, including Hat Yai district of Songkhla, has receded significantly and Prime Minister Abhisit Vejjajiva has already handed out the first lot of 5,000-baht cash aid to flood-affected families in the Northeast as an initial compensation amount from the government, it remains to be seen if families who suffered casualties will receive compensation from the Fund for Disaster Victims as promised. The Cabinet assigned state agencies to help people affected by the floods and advance payments of over Bt100 million was endorsed to aid people affected by floods in Nakhon Ratchasima and Lop Buri.

Private citizens were on the forefront, soliciting donations from other members of the public, rushing aid to flood-stricken areas, and distributing relief packages to flood victims.

== See also ==
- 2010 floods in:
  - China
  - Colombo, Sri Lanka
  - Ladakh, India
  - Pakistan
  - Singapore
- 2010 Pacific typhoon season
- Climate of Malaysia
- Climate of Thailand
- Floods in Thailand
