= Timeline of the 2024 North Indian Ocean cyclone season =

Season boundaries
- First system formed: 24 May
- Last system dissipated: Season ongoing

Strongest system
- Name: Remal
- Maximum winds: 110 km/h (70 mph) (3-minute sustained)
- Lowest pressure: 973 hPa (mbar)

Longest lasting system
- Name: Fengal
- Duration: 9 days
Storm articles
- Cyclone Remal
- Cyclone Asna
- Cyclone Dana
- Cyclone Fengal

This timeline documents all of the events of the 2024 North Indian Ocean cyclone season. The scope of this article is limited to the North Indian basin. During the season, systems will be designated as tropical depressions by the India Meteorological Department (IMD). Since they run the Regional Specialized Meteorological Centre (RSMC) for the basin, they will assign names to tropical depressions which developed into tropical storms in the basin. The Joint Typhoon Warning Center (JTWC) also monitors the basin, issuing unofficial bulletins for tropical cyclones which form in the basin for military interests.

The scope of this article is limited to the Indian Ocean in the Northern Hemisphere, east of the Horn of Africa and west of the Malay Peninsula. There are two main seas in the North Indian Ocean — the Arabian Sea to the west of the Indian subcontinent, abbreviated ARB by the India Meteorological Department (IMD); and the Bay of Bengal to the east, abbreviated BOB by the IMD. And, the depressions formed over the land, are abbreviated LAND by the Indian Meteorological Department.

== Timeline of events ==
=== January ===
January 1

- The 2024 North Indian Ocean cyclone season officially begins.
- No storms form in January.

=== February ===
- No storms form in February.

=== March ===
- No storms form in March.

=== April ===
- No storms form in April.

=== May ===
- May 21, 05:30 IST - An upper air cyclonic circulation developed in lower tropospheric levels over the southwest Bay of Bengal (BOB) in the early morning
- May 22, 05:30 IST - Under its influence, a low pressure area formed over southwest and adjoining westcentral BOB.
- May 23, 08:30 IST - It lay as a well-marked low pressure area over westcentral & adjoining south BOB.
- May 24, 05:30 IST - It concentrated into a depression over central BOB.
- May 25, 05:30 IST - It moved nearly northwards and intensified into a deep depression over the same region.
- May 25, 17:30 IST - It intensified into a cyclonic storm REMAL over the north and adjoining eastcentral BOB.
- May 26, 05:30 IST - Continuing to move nearly northwards it intensified further into a severe cyclonic storm over the North BOB.
- May 26, 22:30 IST - May 27, 00:30 IST - Moving in the same direction, it made landfall over Bangladesh and adjoining West Bengal coasts between Sagar Island and Khepupara close to southwest of Mongla with wind speed of 110 km/h and gusting to 135 km/h.
- May 27, 05:30 IST - Continuing to move northwards, it weakened into a cyclonic storm over coastal Bangladesh and adjoining coastal West Bengal.
- May 27, 14:30 IST - It gradually recurved northeastwards.
- May 27, 20:30 IST - It weakened into a deep depression over central Bangladesh.
- May 28, 05:30 IST - It weakened into a depression over northeast Bangladesh.
- May 28, 17:30 IST - It weakened into a remnant low over Assam and dissipated.

=== June ===
- No storms in June

=== July ===
- July 18, 08:30 IST - A low pressure area formed over central and adjoining north BOB.
- July 18, 17:30 IST - It consolidated further into a well marked low pressure area over the same region.
- July 19, 08:30 IST - It moved northwestwards and concentrated into a depression BOB 02 over northwest and westcentral BOB.
- July 20, 05:30 IST - It moved west-northwestwards and was 40 km off the coast of Puri.
- July 20, 17:30 IST - It weakened into a remnant low over the Odisha coast, near Chilika Lake and dissipated.

=== August ===
- August 02, 17:30 IST - A low-pressure area over Gangetic West Bengal and adjoining Jharkhand concentrated into a depression LAND 01.
- August 02, 23:30 IST - The depression moved west with a speed of 5 km/h and was 60 km south of Gaya.
- August 03, 08:30 IST - Continuing to move west-northwestwards, it intensified further into a deep depression over southwest Bihar and northwest Jharkhand.
- August 04, 08:30 IST - It moved in the same direction and lay centered over northeast Madhya Pradesh and south Uttar Pradesh.
- August 05, 05:30 IST - It weakened back into a depression.
- August 05, 08:30 IST - It lay centered over northeast Rajasthan, 100 km east of Ajmer.
- August 05, 17:30 IST - The system moved at a speed of 30 km/h and lay centered over northwest Rajasthan, 50 km south-southeast of Bikaner.
- August 06, 08:30 IST - The system had weakened into a remnant low and dissipated.
- August 16, 05:30 IST - A low pressure area formed over northwest B0B and adjoining areas of West Bengal and Bangladesh in the morning.
- August 24 - It concentrated into a well-marked low pressure area over southeast Uttar Pradesh and northwest Madhya Pradesh.
- August 25, 05:30 IST - Moving westwards, it intensified into a depression over northwest Madhya Pradesh.
- August 25, 23:30 IST - It intensified further into a deep depression over east Rajasthan.
- August 27 - 29 - This system moved westwards across Gujrat.

Meanwhile, a low-pressure area had formed over central and adjoining north BOB.

- August 30, 08:30 IST - The deep depression emerged over northeast Arabian Sea off Kachchh adjoining the Pakistan coast. Meanwhile, the low pressure area over BOB moved west-northwestwards and lay over west-central BOB off north Andhra Pradesh and south Odisha coasts.
- August 30, 11:30 IST - The deep depression intensified further into cyclonic storm ASNA.
- August 30, 14:30 IST - The system over the BOB intensified further into a well marked low pressure area, moving west-northwestwards.
- August 31, 05:30 IST - Moving westwards, Asna intensified slightly and lay over northeast Arabian Sea. Meanwhile, the well-marked low-pressure area over the BOB intensified further into depression BOB 03 over the same region.
- August 31, 11:30 IST - BOB 03 moved north-northwestwards at a speed of 8 km/h and lay 110 km east of Visakhapatnam.
- August 31, 17:30 IST -Asna moved westwards at a speed of 15 km/h and lay centered 580 km east of Muscat. Meanwhile, moving northwestwards at a speed of 7 km/h, BOB 03 lay centered 160 km southwest of Gopalpur.

=== September ===
- September 1, 02:30 IST - BOB 03 crossed the coasts north Andhra Pradesh and south Odisha, near Kalingapatnam.
- September 1, 05:30 IST - Asna continued moving southwestwards with a speed of 13 km/h and lay centered over 640 km west of Nailya. Meanwhile, BOB 03 moved west-northwestwards with a speed of 15 km/h and lay centered over south Odisha and south Chhattisgarh.
- September 1, 17:30 IST - Asna weakened into a deep depression over northwest Arabian Sea, moving south-southwestwards, 200 km east of Ras Al Hadd. Meanwhile, BOB 03 moved west-northwestwards at a speed of 17 km/h over south Chhattisgarh, 90 km west of Jagdalpur.
- September 2, 05:30 IST - The remnants of cyclone Asna weakened further into a depression over the same region. BOB 03 lay centered over east Vidharbha, 110 km north-northeast of Ramagundam.
- September 2, 11:30 IST - The remnants of cyclone Asna weakened into a well-marked low pressure area. BOB 03 continued moving west-northwestwards across Vidharbha.
- September 2, 17:30 IST - BOB 03 weakened into a well-marked low-pressure area over east Vidharbha and adjoining Telangana.
- September 3, 08:30 IST- The system weakened into a remnant low over westcentral Arabian Sea and dissipated. BOB 03 too, weakened into a remnant low and dissipated.
- Deep Depression BOB 04 from September 7 to 13.
- Deep Depression BOB 05 from September 13 to 18.

=== October ===
- Depression ARB 01 from October 13 to 15.
- Depression BOB 06 from October 15 to 17.
- Cyclone Dana from October 22 to 26.

=== November ===
- Cyclone Fengal from November 25 to December 04.

=== December ===
December 30

- The season officially ends as the 2025 North Indian Ocean cyclone season begins.

== See also ==
- Tropical cyclones in 2024
- 2024 North Indian Ocean cyclone season
- Timeline of the 2024 Atlantic hurricane season
- Timeline of the 2024 Pacific hurricane season
- Timeline of the 2024 Pacific typhoon season
