= Cyclone Dana =

North Indian Ocean cyclone in 2024

Severe Cyclonic Storm Dana
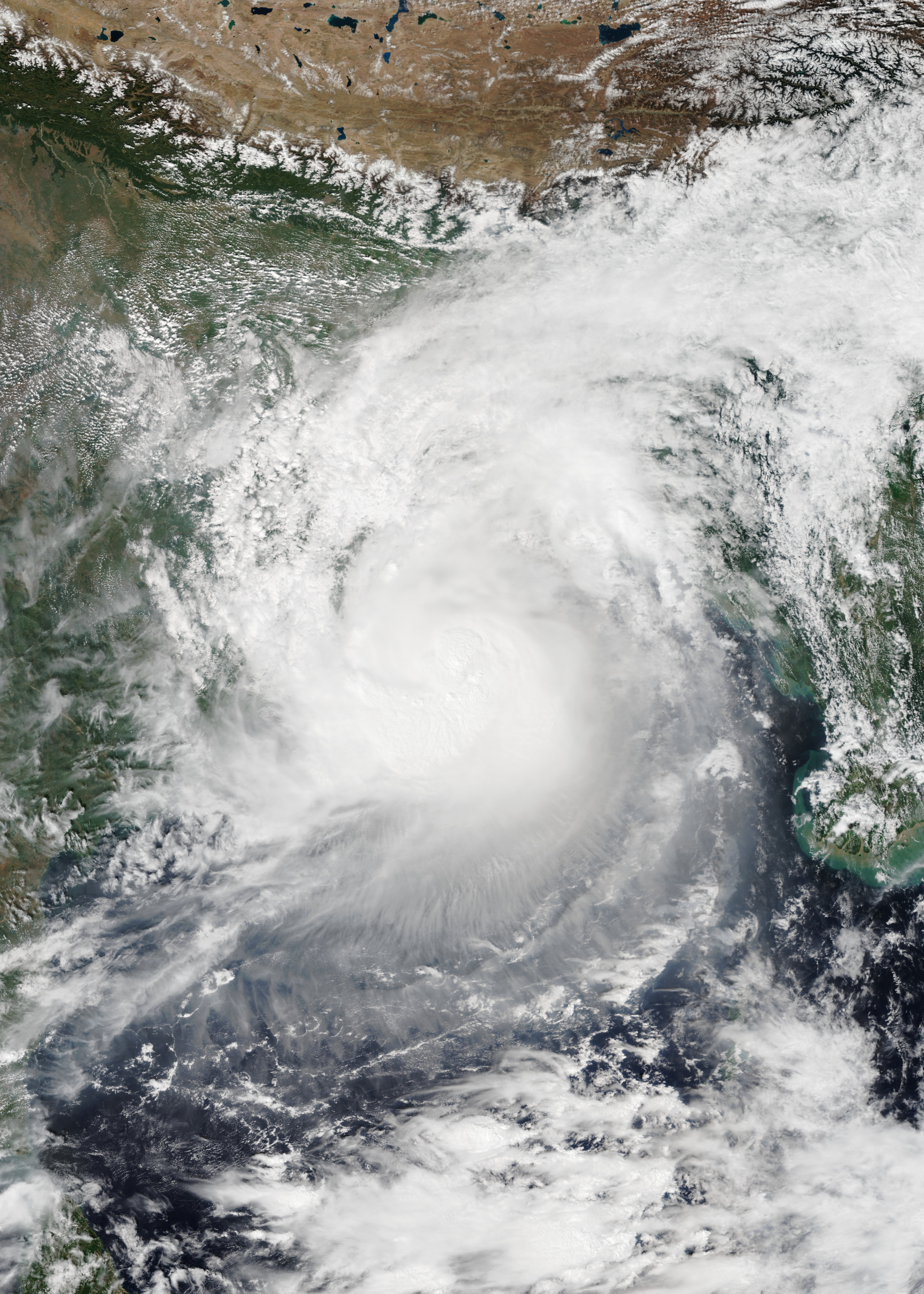
- Dana at its peak intensity over the Bay of Bengal on 24 October

Meteorological history
- Formed: 22 October 2024
- Remnant low: 26 October 2024
- Dissipated: 27 October 2024

Severe cyclonic storm
- 3-minute sustained (IMD)
- Highest winds: 110 km/h (70 mph)
- Lowest pressure: 986 hPa (mbar); 29.12 inHg

Category 1-equivalent tropical cyclone
- 1-minute sustained (SSHWS/JTWC)
- Highest winds: 120 km/h (75 mph)
- Lowest pressure: 985 hPa (mbar); 29.09 inHg

Overall effects
- Fatalities: 6
- Missing: 4
- Damage: $73.3 million (2024 USD)
- Areas affected: India (particularly Odisha, West Bengal); Bangladesh
- IBTrACS
- Part of the 2024 North Indian Ocean cyclone season

Severe Cyclonic Storm Dana (Note: The name Dana (Arabic: دانة, [daːnə]) was contributed by Qatar and means "pearl" in Arabic.) was a tropical cyclone which affected West Bengal, Odisha, and Bangladesh in late October 2024. The third cyclonic storm and second severe cyclonic storm of the 2024 North Indian Ocean cyclone season, Dana formed from a low pressure area in the Bay of Bengal on 22 October. By 24 October, it had intensified into a severe cyclonic storm and made landfall on the coast of Odisha. It weakened inland, becoming a remnant low on 26 October.

Preparations for Dana saw more than 362,000 people evacuated in Odisha and a zero-casualty target being set for the state by its chief minister. Over 300,000 people were evacuated in West Bengal. 25 National Disaster Response Force teams were deployed across both states. Dana caused torrential rainfall in Odisha, causing hundreds of trees to be uprooted. Some power outages occurred and a woman in a storm shelter died after what was suspected to be a cardiac arrest. In West Bengal, four people went missing after multiple boats capsized, and four deaths occurred in the state. In Bangladesh, one fatality occurred, and falling trees destroyed some buildings.

== Meteorological history ==
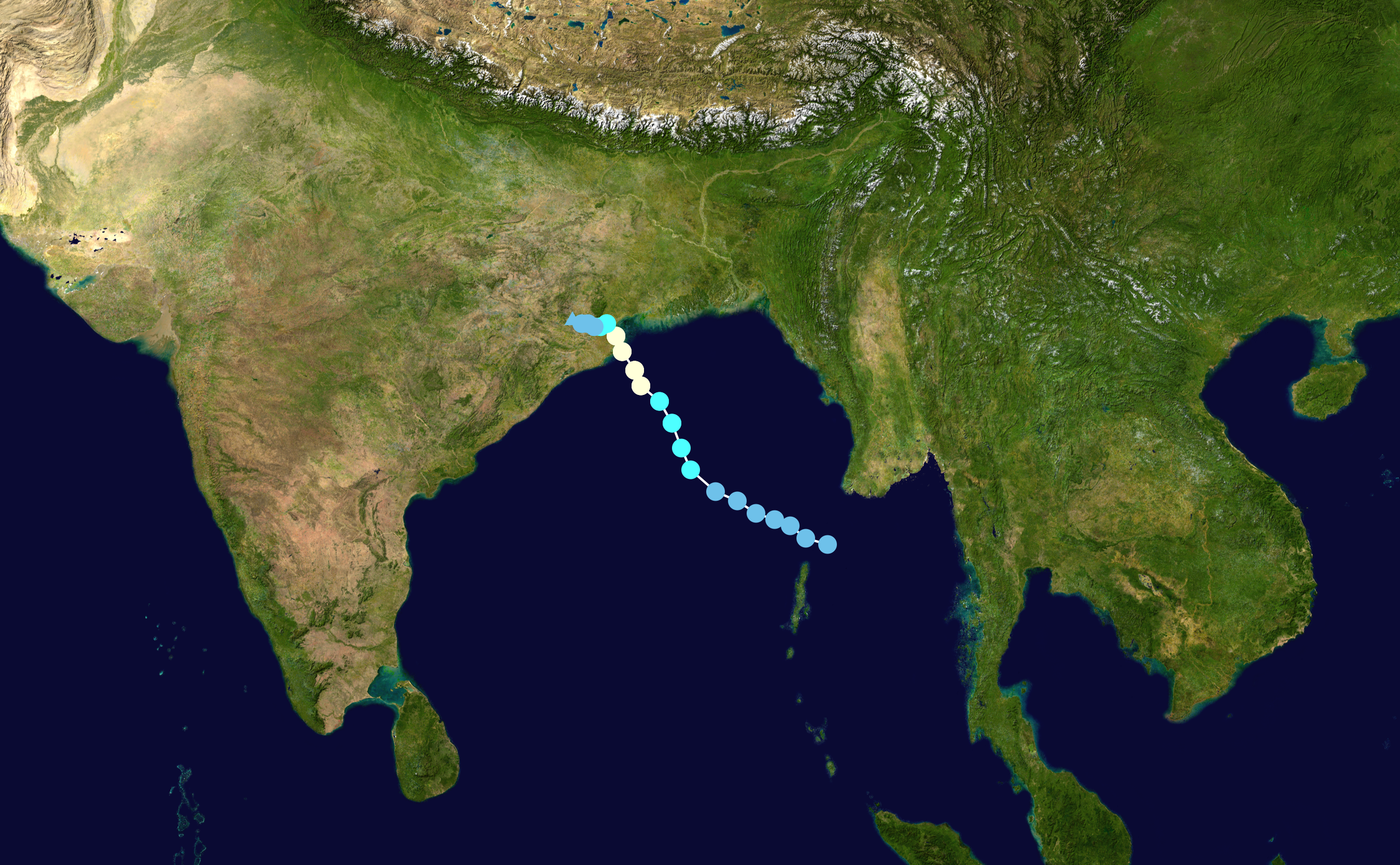
Map plotting the storm's track and intensity, according to the Saffir–Simpson scale Map key Saffir–Simpson scale Tropical depression (≤38 mph, ≤62 km/h) Tropical storm (39–73 mph, 63–118 km/h) Category 1 (74–95 mph, 119–153 km/h) Category 2 (96–110 mph, 154–177 km/h) Category 3 (111–129 mph, 178–208 km/h) Category 4 (130–156 mph, 209–251 km/h) Category 5 (≥157 mph, ≥252 km/h) Unknown Storm type Tropical cyclone Subtropical cyclone Extratropical cyclone, remnant low, tropical disturbance, or monsoon depression

On 22 October, a depression formed in the eastern Bay of Bengal, originating from a low-pressure area. This depression would track west-northwestwards and intensified into a deep depression twelve hours after its formation. After showing further signs of development, the system was designated a cyclonic storm by the India Meteorological Department (IMD) on 23 October, being assigned the name Dana. At this time, it had a minimum central pressure of 998 mb (29.5 inHg). The Joint Typhoon Warning Center (JTWC) also began tracking the storm, designating it Tropical Cyclone 03B. Strengthening into a severe cyclonic storm later that day, Dana tracked north-northwestwards. Thunderstorm activity continued over the storm's center of circulation as it moved closer to the coast of eastern India on 24 October.

Dana made landfall near Bhitarkanika National Park later that same day with a minimum central pressure of 986 mb (29.1 inHg). Moving inland over northern Odisha on 25 October, it weakened into a cyclonic storm and then a deep depression. The IMD issued its last advisory on the system as it weakened into a remnant low on 26 October over the same region.

== Preparations ==
In Odisha, over 362,000 people across 1,653 villages were evacuated and 5,209 emergency shelters were set up, while over 300,000 were evacuated in West Bengal. 14 school districts in Odisha were closed from 23–25 October, and nine school districts in West Bengal were closed from 23–26 October. Restrictions were imposed on tourists in some coastal towns. Odisha chief minister Mohan Charan Majhi set a target for zero casualties and said that the state was "in total preparedness". Odisha vegetable markets were stressed when the public learned of the oncoming cyclone, and a state officer warned against panic buying and illegal hoarding. A total of 25 National Disaster Response Force (NDRF) teams, 11 in Odisha and 14 in West Bengal, were deployed. 135 railway operations were cancelled in the South Eastern Railway zone.

== Impact and aftermath ==
Dana caused torrential rainfall in Odisha which flooded parts of its eastern coast and felled hundreds of trees. The mangrove cover of Bhitarkanika National Park lessened storm surge and minimized damage at the location of landfall and nearby areas. A total of 62 mm (2.4 in) of rain fell in Paradip on 24 October, and downed trees blocked multiple roads in locations across the state. The roofs of some homes near the coast were blown away. The Budhabalanga River rose to a water level of 7.84 m (25.7 ft) in the Balasore district, and the rainfall from the cyclone caused flash flooding there and in the Bhadrak district. Winds also knocked down electricity poles, causing power outages in some locations. According to UNICEF, two mobile towers were affected as of 28 October. Rice crops were inundated, leading to monetary losses for farmers. UNICEF reported that 180,000 ha (440,000 acres) of standing crops had been ruined. A woman in a storm shelter in Kendrapara district died after a potential cardiac arrest. Total damages in the state were estimated at ₹6,161,900,000 (US$64 million), with ₹829,200,000 (US$8.7 million) of it being to crops and ₹213,200,000 (US$2.2 million) being to homes. A minimum of 16,417 homes sustained damage.

Embankment failures in West Bengal contributed to property damage. Four deaths occurred across the state due to Dana, three of which were due to electrocution. Another four people went missing in Murshidabad after strong winds from Dana caused multiple boats to capsize in the Ganges river. Rescue efforts were launched to find them, but the adverse weather conditions limited the team's abilities. Some passengers on the boats were able to swim back to land and were transported to a hospital for medical attention. Jodhpur Park in Kolkata recorded rainfall of more than 190 mm (7.5 in) between 4 am and 8 pm on 25 October.

In Betagi, a farmer died from his injuries after a large branch fell off a tree and struck his head. Falling trees also destroyed some homes and schools in Kathalia. Fishing vessels were advised to stay in port until 26 October. The highest amount of rainfall in Bangladesh occurred on 25 October, when 82 mm (3.2 in) fell in Chuadanga.

By 26 October, power had been reinstated to around 90% of the households where it had been lost, according to Odisha's disaster management minister Suresh Pujari. Pujari also stated that people whose homes were destroyed would be rehoused in pucca houses. On 6 November, the government of Odisha paid a total of ₹4,230,000,000 (US$44 million) to the magistrates of affected districts, who were ordered to reimburse the funds to impacted citizens within seven days. It also spent ₹23,730,000 (US$250,000) directly to assist recovery efforts.

== See also ==
- Weather of 2024
- Tropical cyclones in 2024
- Timeline of the 2024 North Indian Ocean cyclone season
