= 2024 North Indian Ocean cyclone season =

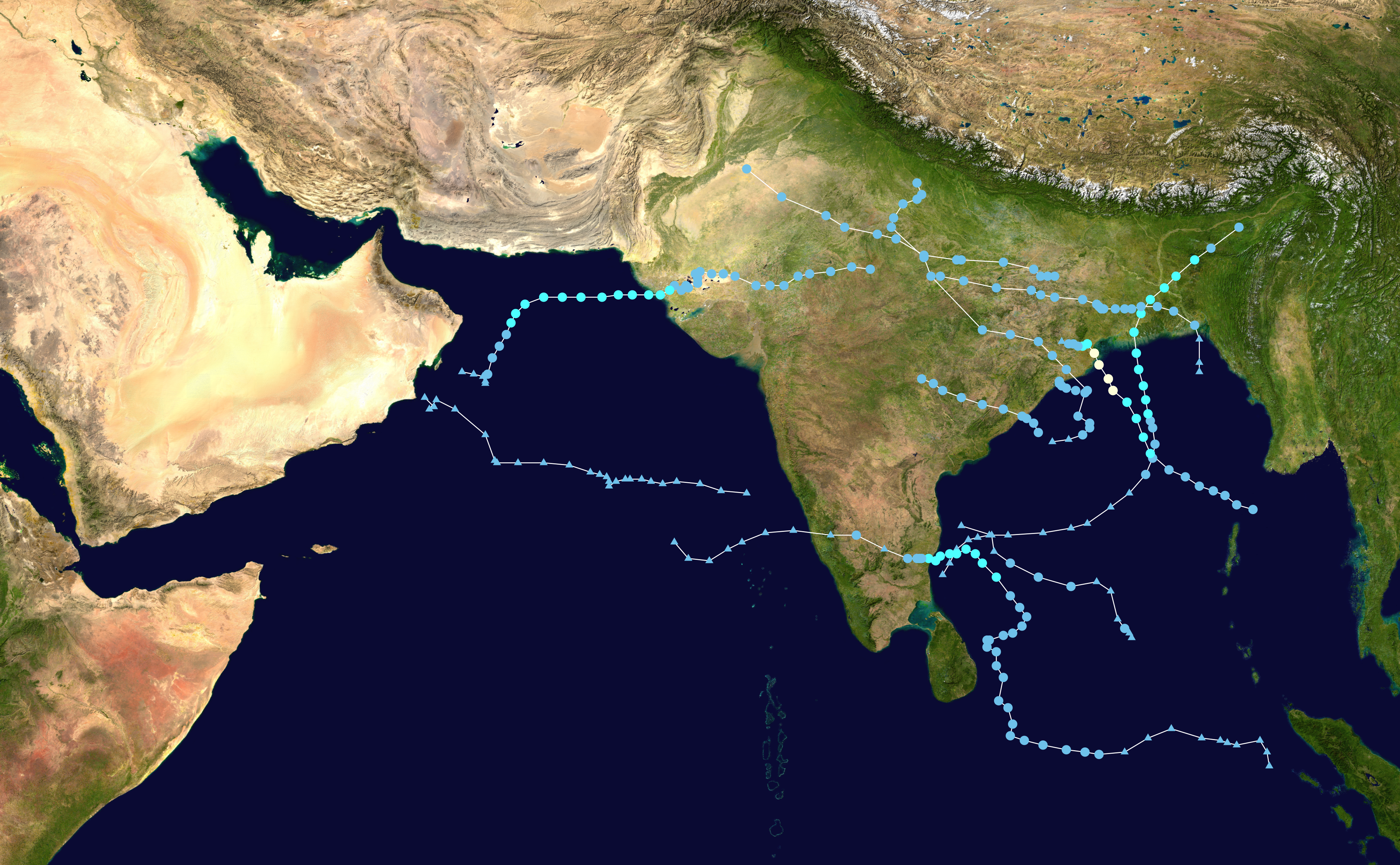
- Season summary map

Seasonal boundaries
- First system formed: 24 May 2024
- Last system dissipated: 21 December 2024

Strongest storm
- Name: Remal
  - Maximum winds: 110 km/h (70 mph) (3-minute sustained)
  - Lowest pressure: 978 hPa (mbar)

Seasonal statistics
- Depressions: 12
- Deep depressions: 7
- Cyclonic storms: 4
- Severe cyclonic storms: 2
- Total fatalities: 257 total
- Total damage: $2.35 billion (2024 USD)

Related articles
- 2024 Atlantic hurricane season; 2024 Pacific hurricane season; 2024 Pacific typhoon season

The 2024 North Indian Ocean cyclone season marks the first consecutive season in which at least one very severe cyclonic storm has not formed, the first time since 2012. Despite this, it was an average season, with four cyclonic storms formed and only two severe cyclonic storms. Seasons have no official bounds, but cyclones tend to form between April and December, with the peak from May to Early November. These dates conventionally delimit each year when most tropical cyclones form in the northern Indian Ocean.

The scope of this article is limited to the Indian Ocean in the Northern Hemisphere, east of the Horn of Africa and west of the Malay Peninsula. There are two main seas in the North Indian Ocean — the Arabian Sea to the west of the Indian subcontinent, abbreviated ARB by the India Meteorological Department (IMD); and the Bay of Bengal to the east, abbreviated BOB by the IMD. And, the depressions formed over the land, are abbreviated LAND by the Indian Meteorological Department. The official Regional Specialized Meteorological Centre in this basin is the India Meteorological Department (IMD), while the Joint Typhoon Warning Center (JTWC) releases unofficial advisories. On average, four to five cyclonic storms form in this basin every season.

== Systems ==
=== Severe Cyclonic Storm Remal ===
- Severe cyclonic storm (IMD)
- Tropical storm (SSHWS)
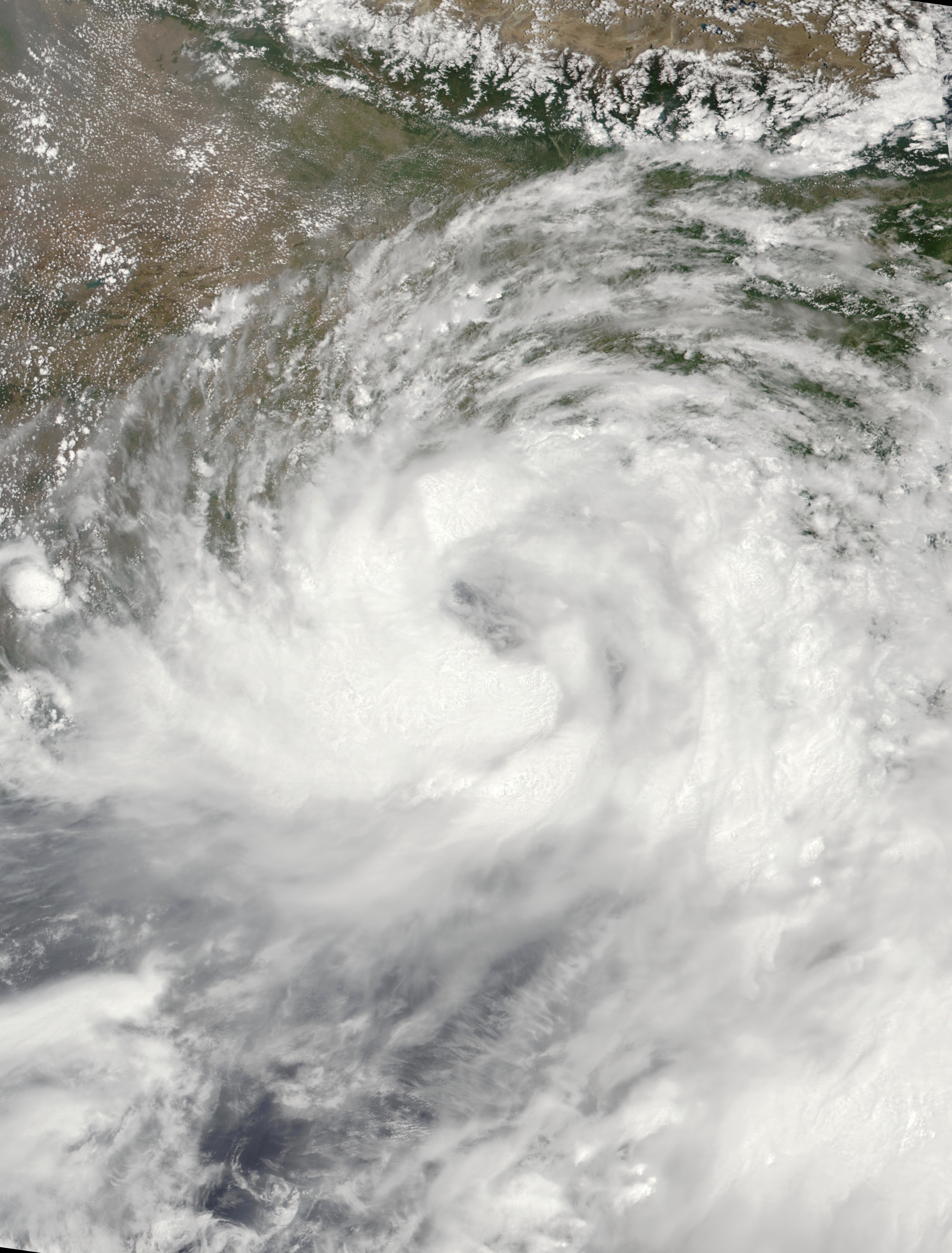
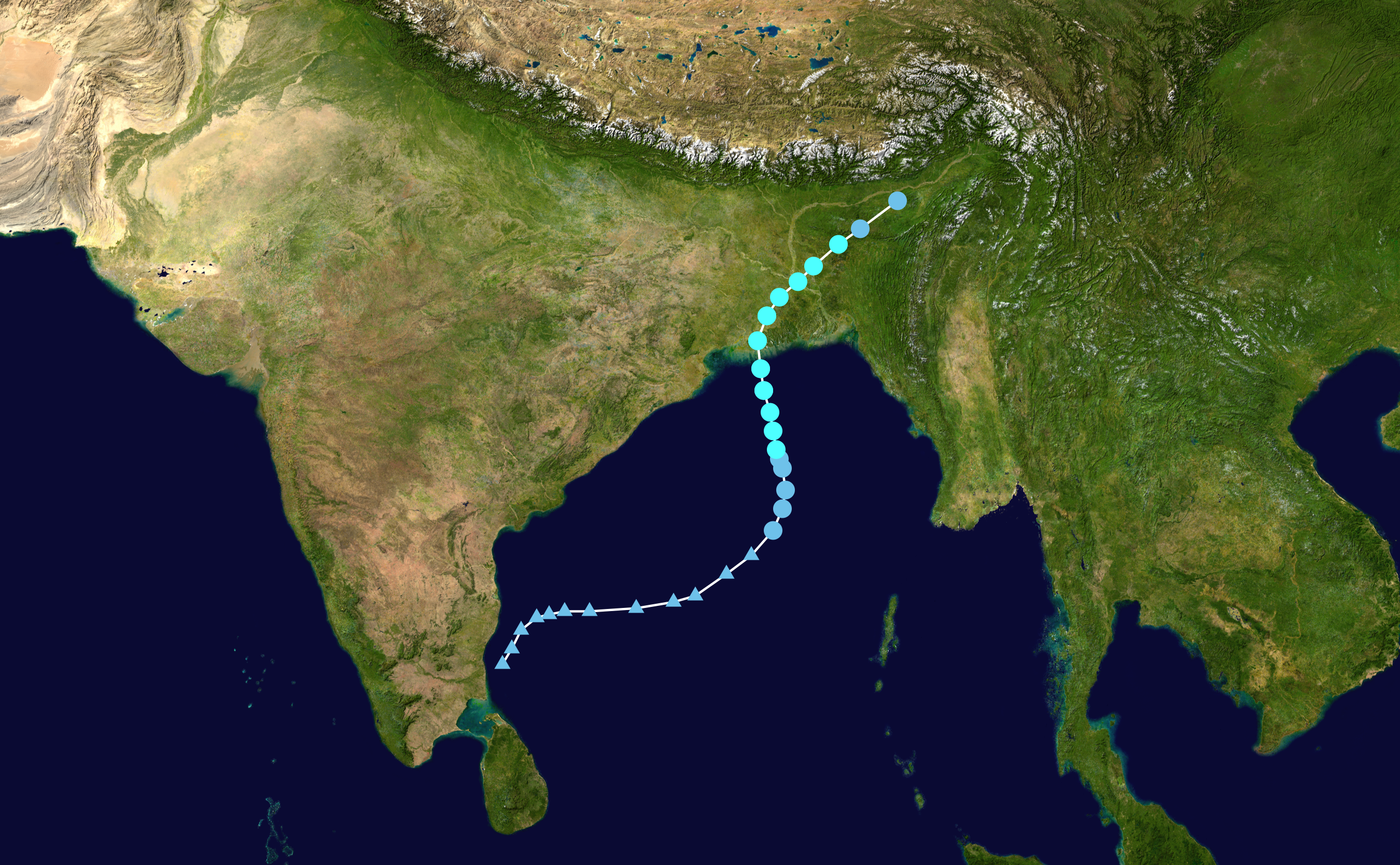
- Duration: 24 May – 28 May
- Peak intensity: 110 km/h (70 mph) (3-min); 978 hPa (mbar)

After four months of inactivity, on 21 May, the India Meteorological Department (IMD) began monitoring a cyclonic circulation in the Bay of Bengal. Later that day, the Joint Typhoon Warning Center (JTWC) would also begin tracking the system, noting that it was likely to become a monsoon depression. The next day, the IMD noted that a low-pressure area had formed adjacent to the cyclonic circulation. Late on 23 May, the IMD upgraded the system into a well-marked low, stating that it was rapidly coalescing. The next day, the IMD stated that the depression formed in the Bay of Bengal, designating it as BOB 01. Subsequently, the JTWC issued a Tropical Cyclone Formation Alert (TCFA), noting the depression's broad circulation center and its improving rainbands. The next day, BOB 01 intensified into a deep depression. The JTWC would recognize the system as a cyclone, designating it as 01B. Soon after, the depression intensified into a cyclonic storm, causing the IMD to name it Remal. (Note: The name Remal (Arabic: رمال, [rimaːl]) was contributed by Oman and means "grains of sand" in Arabic.) On 26 May, Remal intensified into a severe cyclonic storm with 3-minute sustained winds of 95 km/h (60 mph). Due to favourable conditions, including high sea surface temperatures over northern Bay of Bengal and low wind shear, Remal intensified further with wind speeds reaching 110 km/h. It made landfall over Bangladesh and adjoining West Bengal on the night of 26 May. Landfall process was completed by the morning of 27 May and it had weakened into a cyclonic storm.

=== Depression BOB 02 ===
- Depression (IMD)
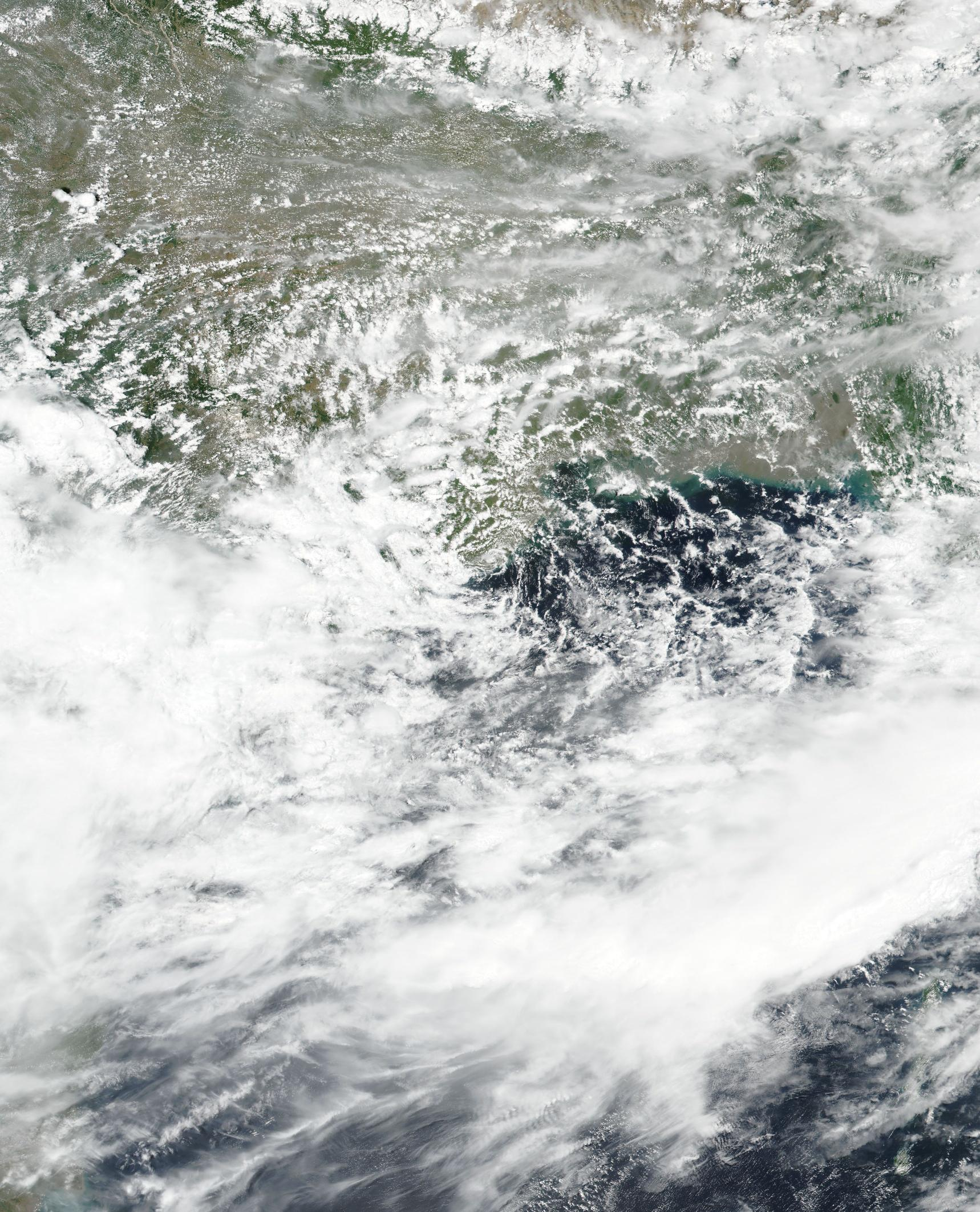
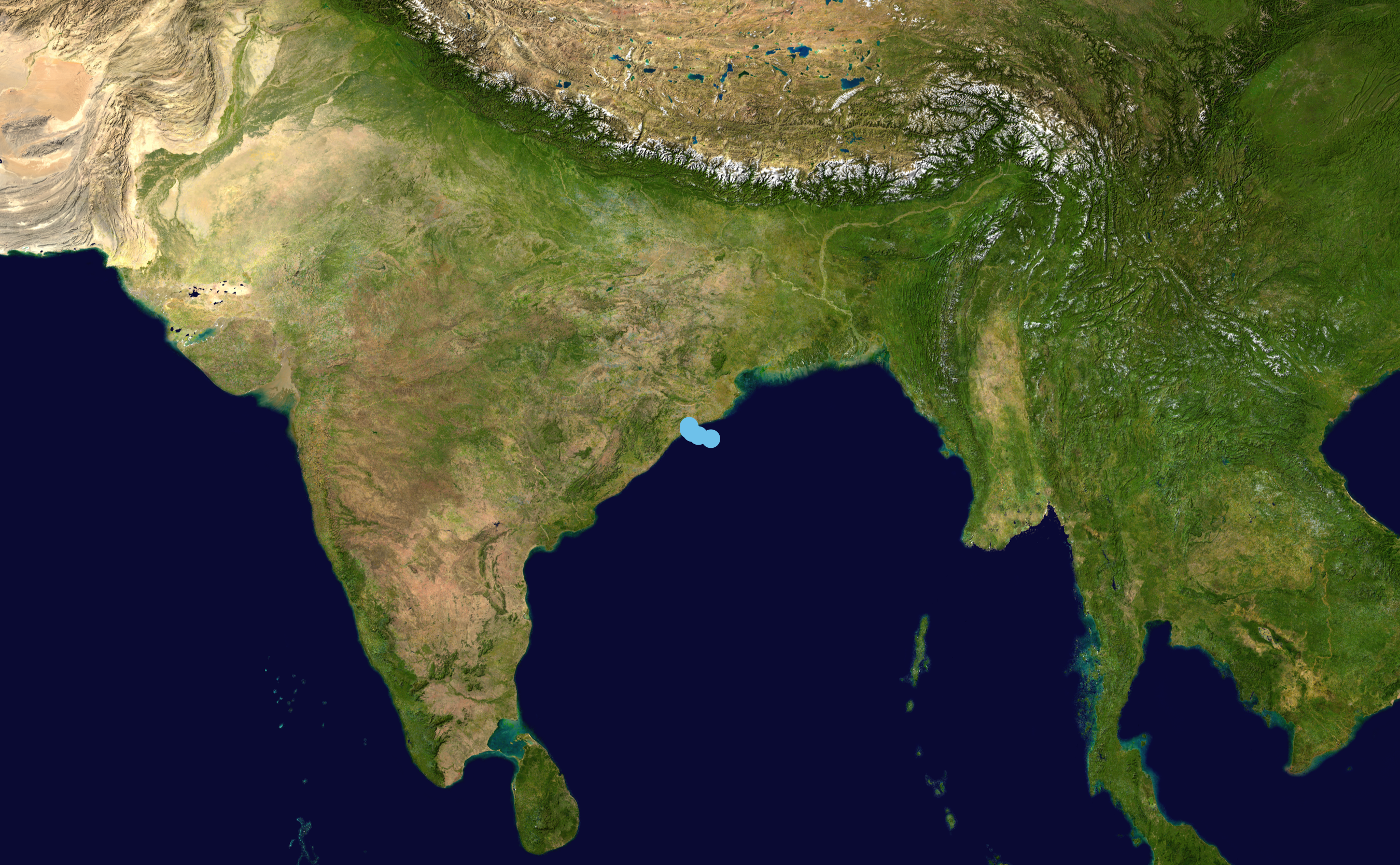
- Duration: 19 July – 20 July
- Peak intensity: 45 km/h (30 mph) (3-min); 990 hPa (mbar)

On 19 July, IMD marked an area of low pressure off the coast of Odisha. The disturbance was later upgraded into a depression, designated as BOB 02. The disturbance later moved inland, weakened back into a low-pressure area.

=== Deep Depression LAND 01 ===
- Deep depression (IMD)
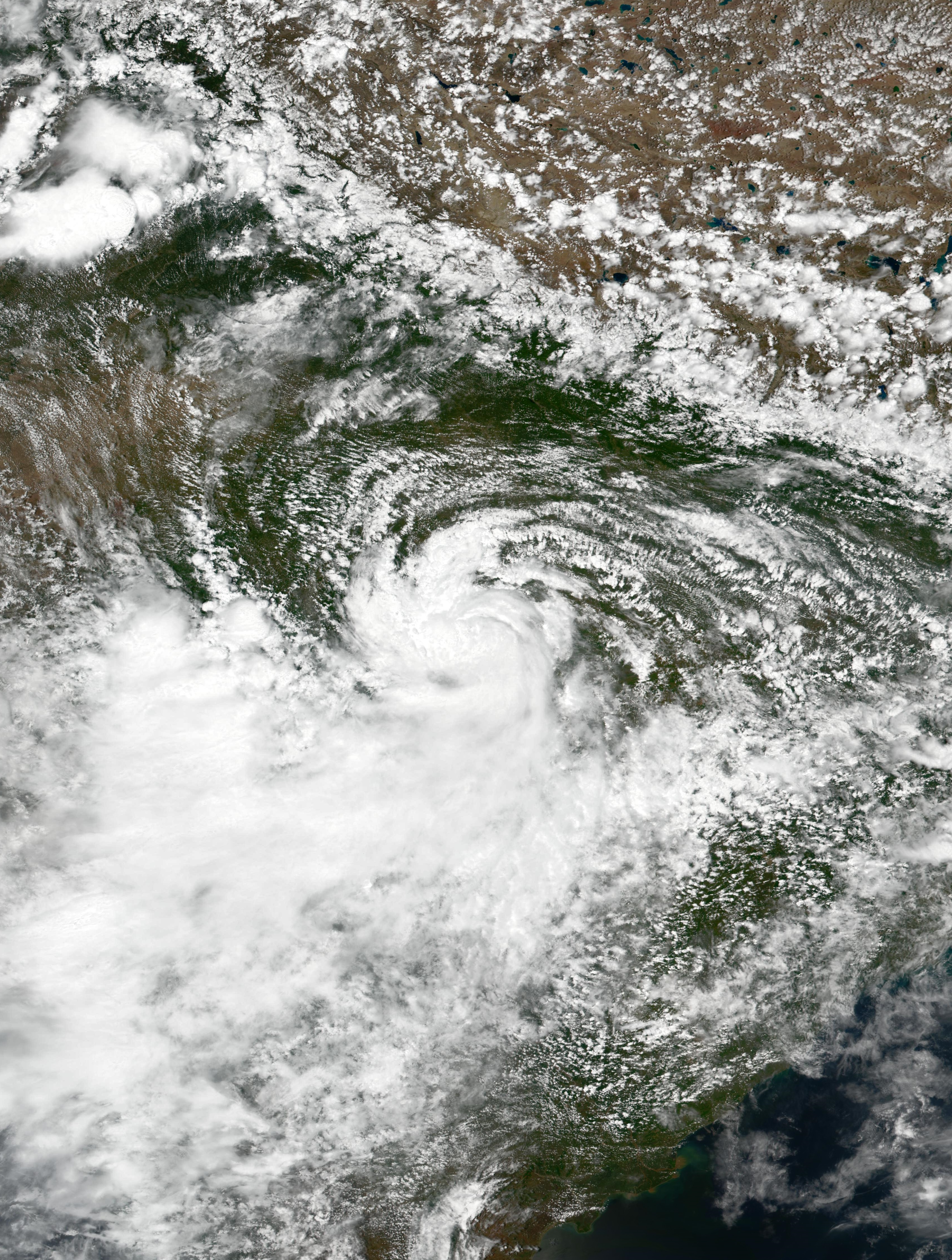
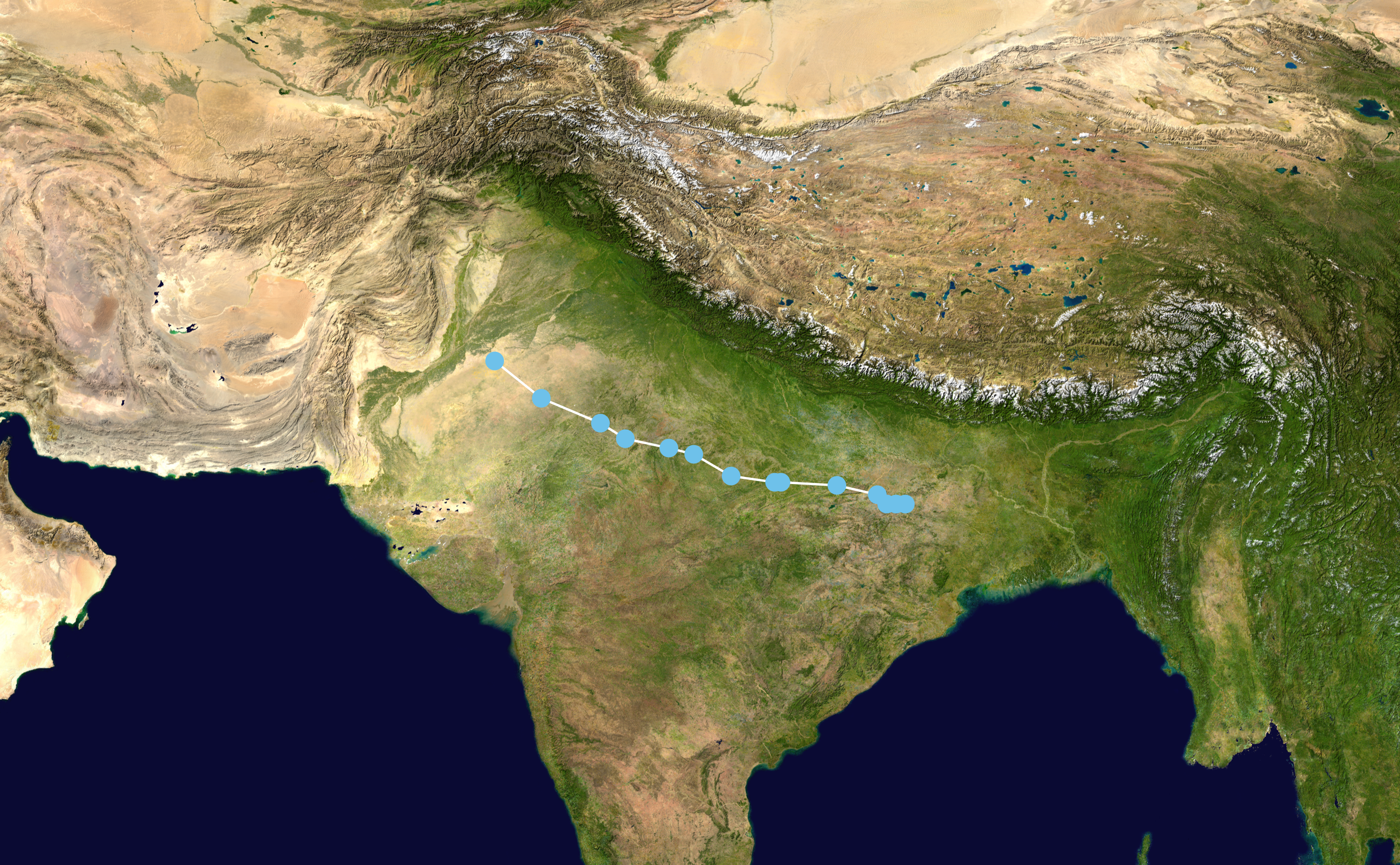
- Duration: 2 August – 6 August
- Peak intensity: 55 km/h (35 mph) (3-min); 988 hPa (mbar)

On 31 July, a cyclonic circulation formed over Gangetic West Bengal. Tracking westward, on 2 August, the disturbance developed into a depression. Two days later, it intensified further, becoming a deep depression over southwest Bihar. Continuing its westward track, on 5 August, the system weakened into a depression. It dissipated the next day.

Due to the westward shift of the monsoon trough, the depression formed on land instead of the usual formation in the Bay of Bengal.

As a result of the depression, Dum Dum in Kolkata received 100 millimetres (3.9 in) of rain on 3 August.

=== Cyclonic Storm Asna ===
- Cyclonic storm (IMD)
- Tropical storm (SSHWS)
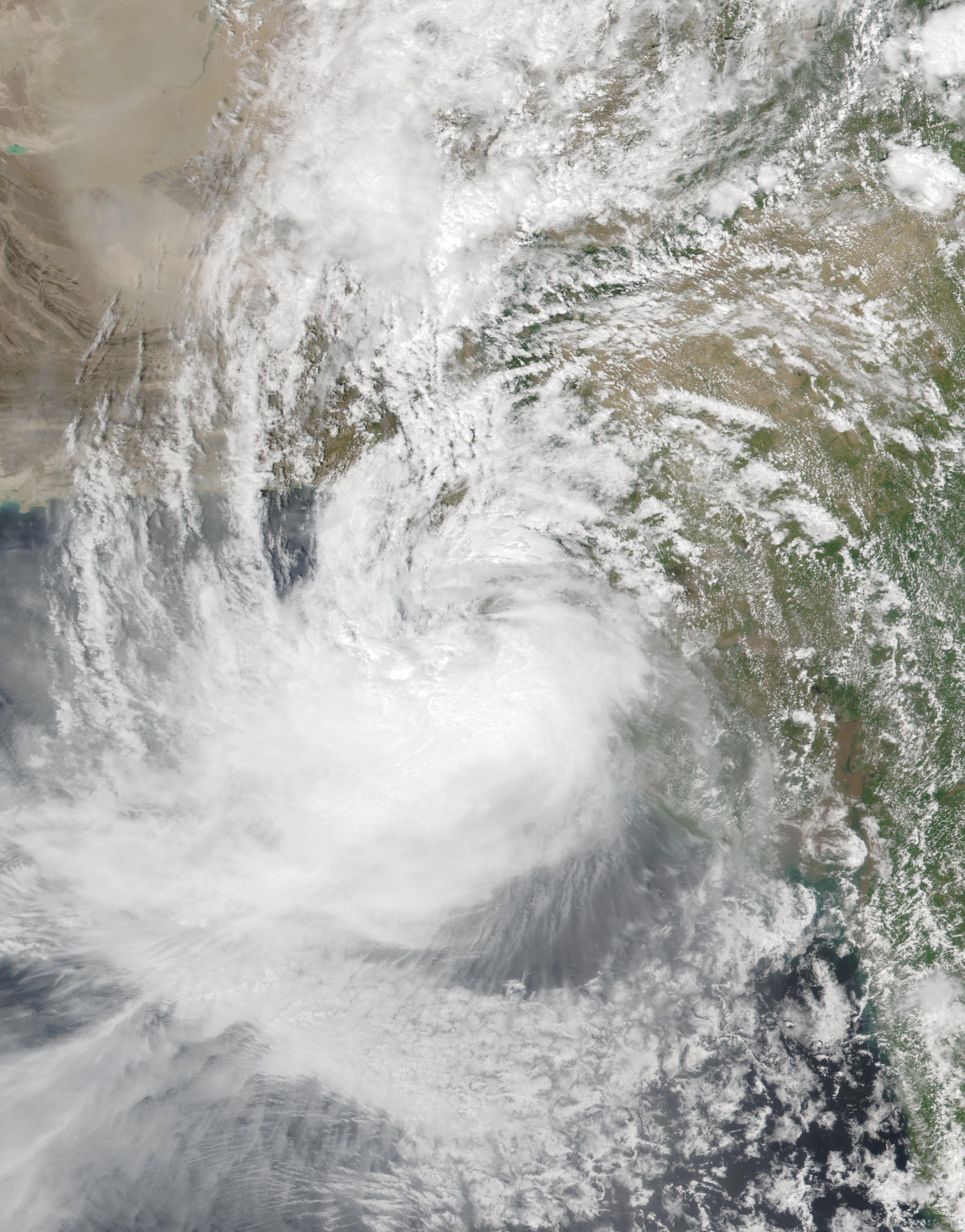
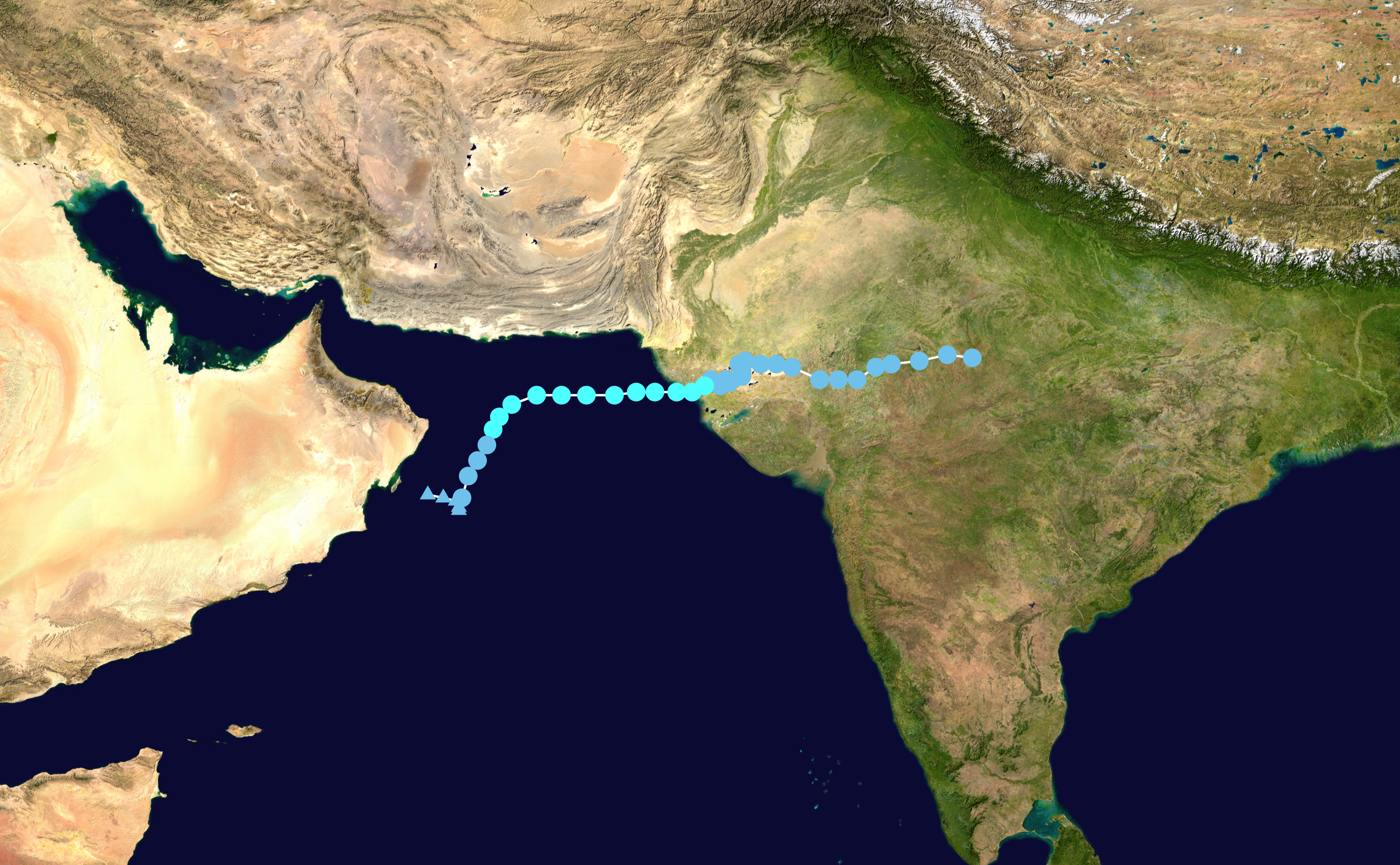
- Duration: 25 August – 2 September
- Peak intensity: 75 km/h (45 mph) (3-min); 990 hPa (mbar)

On 24 August, a cyclonic circulation formed over Madhya and Uttar Pradesh. Early the next day, on 25 August, the IMD noted that it had developed into a land depression over Rajasthan and Madhya Pradesh. Later that day, the depression intensified into a deep depression southeast of Udaipur. On 27 August, the JTWC began tracking the deep depression, noting that it was in a marginal environment for development. Two days later, on 29 August, they issued a TCFA on the developing depression, prior to designating it as Tropical Cyclone 02A early the next day. Later that same day, on 30 August, the IMD upgraded it into a cyclonic storm, naming it Asna. (Note: The name Asna (Urdu: اسنا, [ɑːsnɑː]) was contributed by Pakistan and is a feminine given name meaning "praised" in Urdu.) It further moved into the Arabian Sea. On 1 September, Asna was stripped of any convection due to dry air entrainment and degenerated to a remnant low.

Many parts of Gujarat and Madhya Pradesh were flooded due to heavy rains from the storm. p to 260 mm (10 in) of rain fell in Vadodara and Ahmedabad recorded 120 mm (4.7 in) of rainfall. Flooding in Gujarat killed 49 people. An initial survey reported that the Government of Gujarat suffered damages worth more than ₹250 crore (US$26 million) to government properties and public infrastructure.

=== Depression BOB 03 ===
- Depression (IMD)
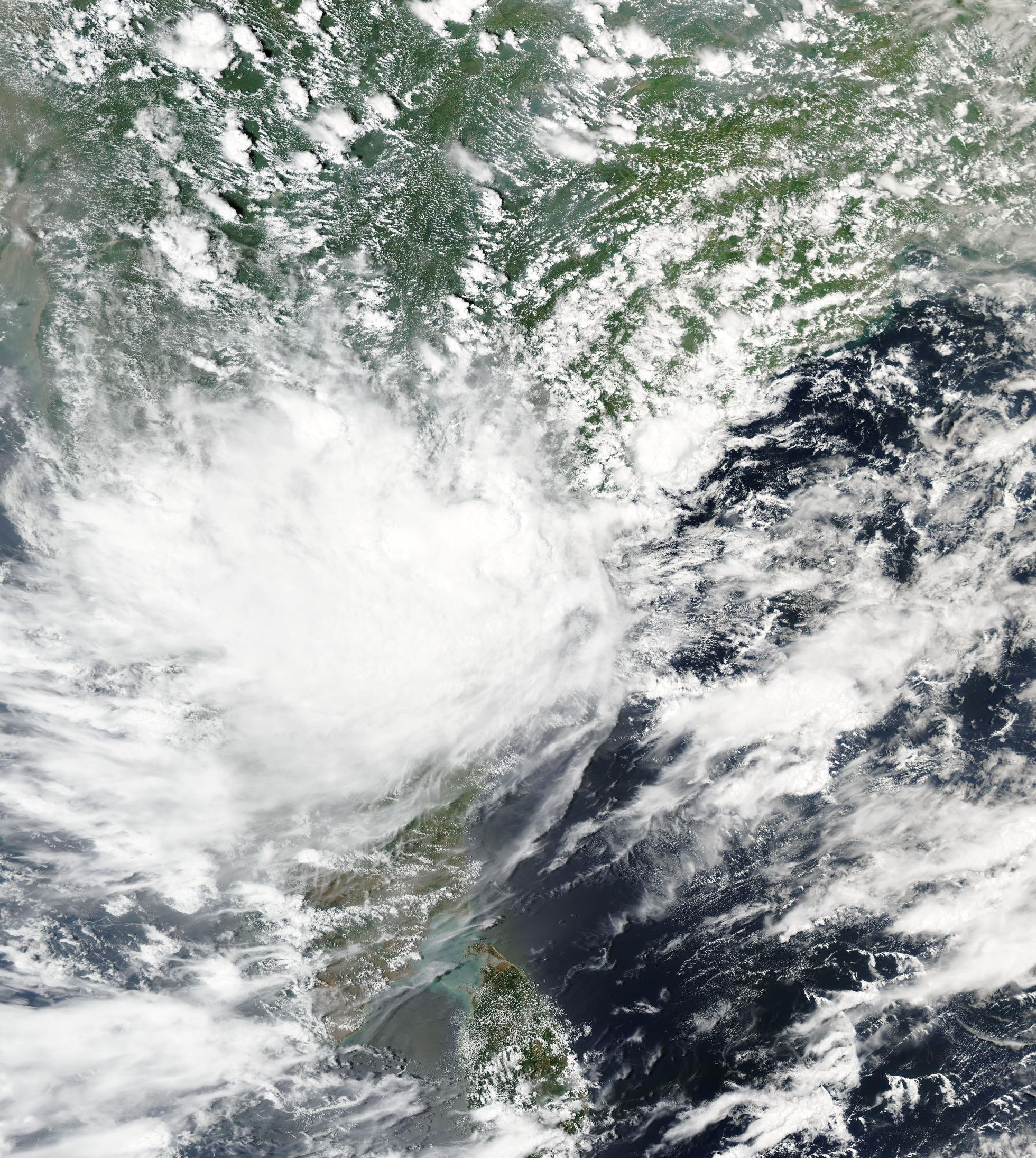
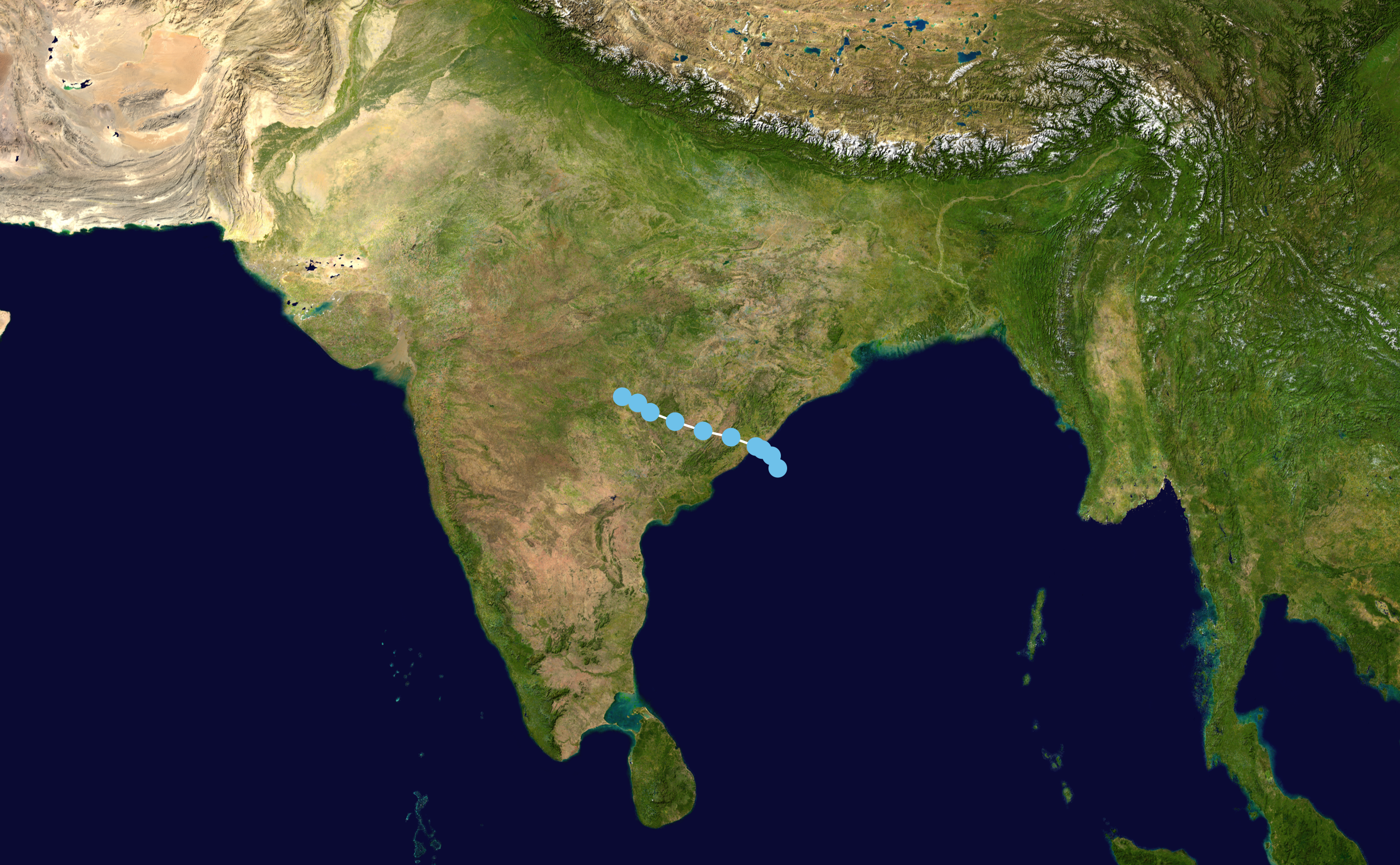
- Duration: 31 August – 2 September
- Peak intensity: 45 km/h (30 mph) (3-min); 996 hPa (mbar)

On 29 August, the IMD marked an area of low pressure in the Bay of Bengal. Two days later, early on 31 August, the IMD upgraded it into a depression, designated as BOB 03, off the coast of Andhra Pradesh. It made landfall that same day before weakening back to a low pressure inland.

27 deaths from rain related incidents were recorded in Andhra Pradesh and Telangana. Flooding caused by the depression resulted in a loss of ₹7,600 crore (US$906 million) and ₹5,438 crore (US$648 million) in Andhra Pradesh and Telangana respectively.

=== Deep Depression BOB 04 ===
- Deep depression (IMD)
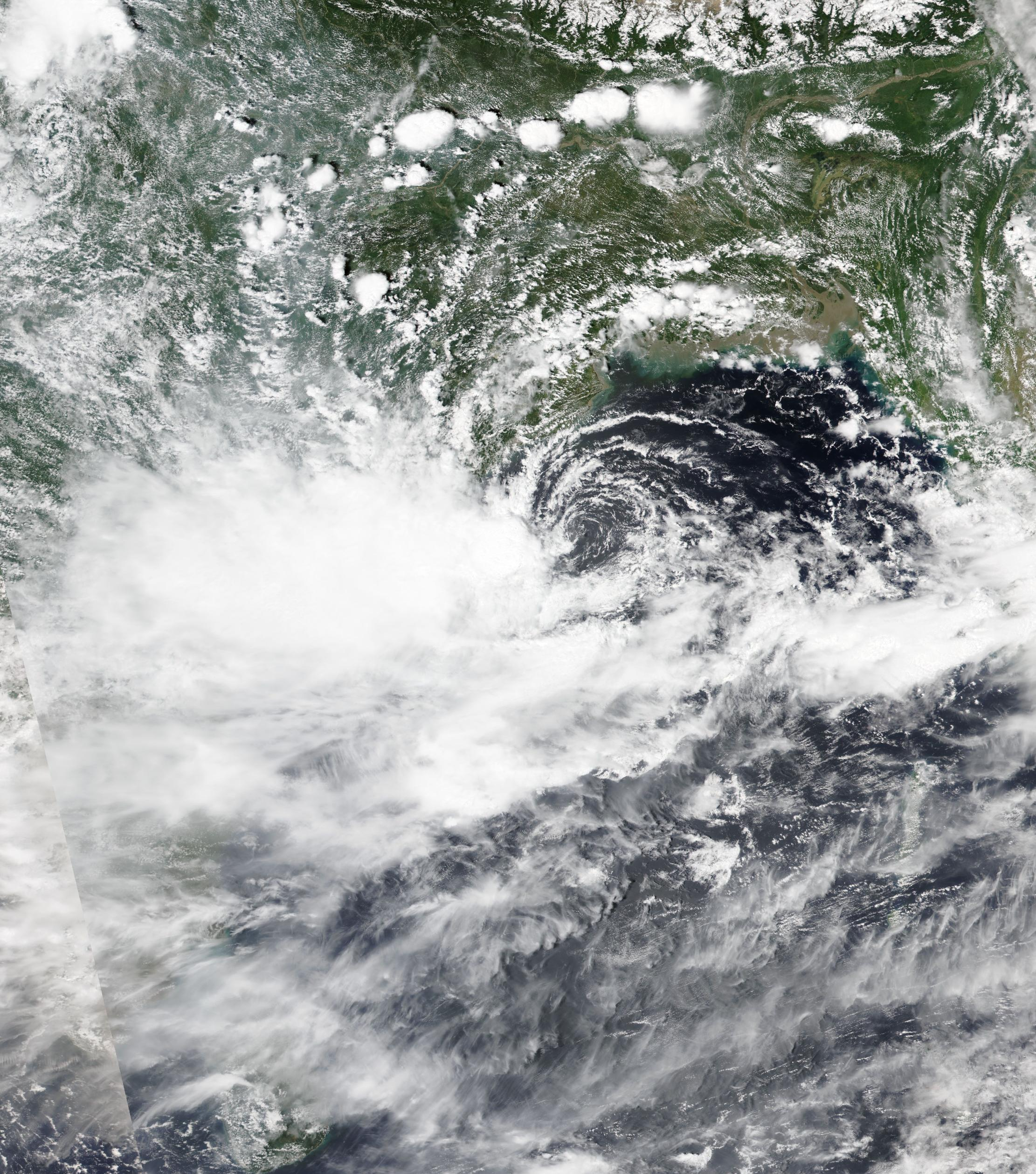
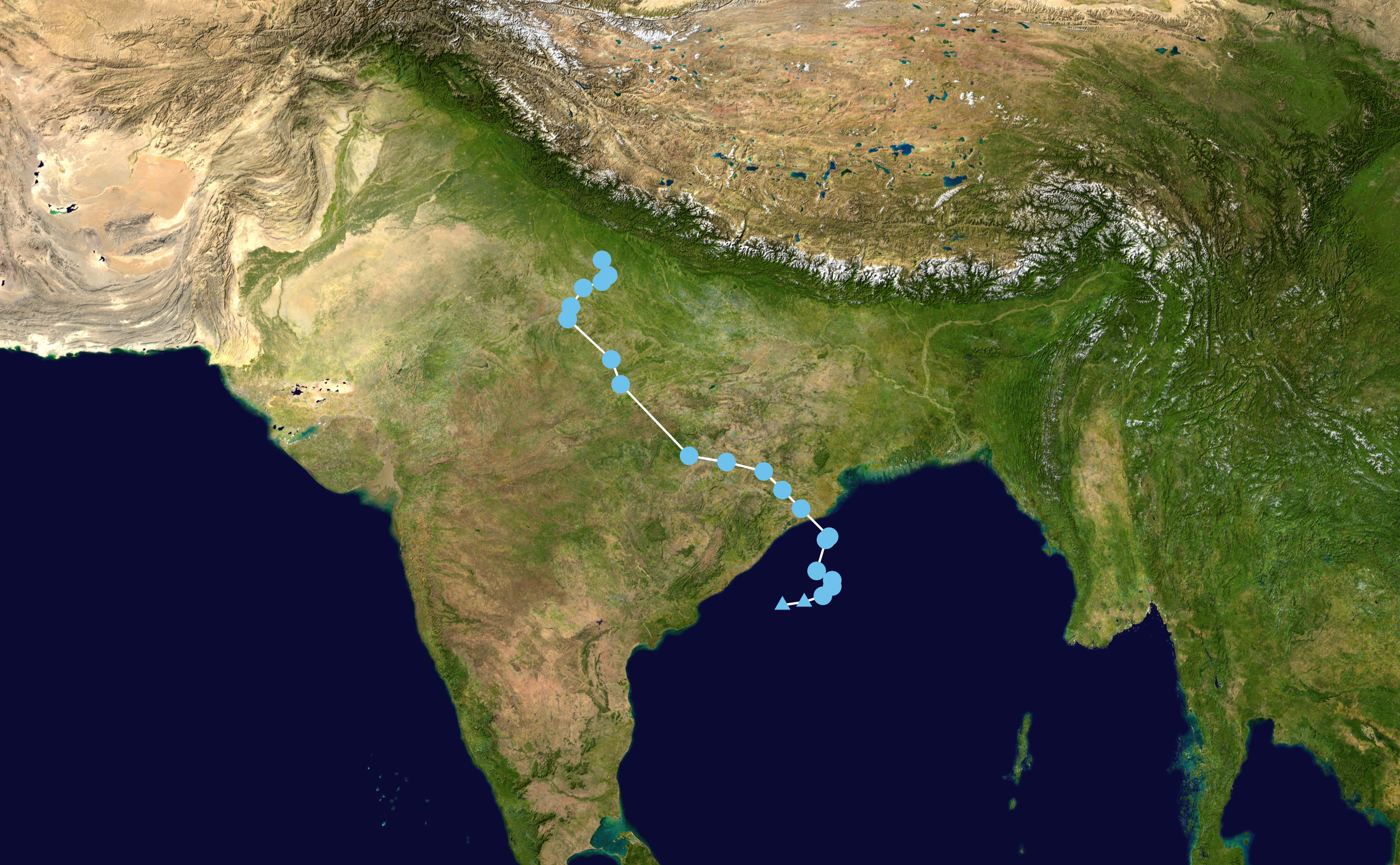
- Duration: 8 September – 13 September
- Peak intensity: 55 km/h (35 mph) (3-min); 991 hPa (mbar)

Late on 5 September, the IMD marked an area of low pressure in the Bay of Bengal. On 7 September, it got upgraded to a depression by the IMD and marked as Invest 92B by the JTWC. Then, on 8 September, it got upgraded to a deep depression off the coast of Odisha. On 9 September, the deep depression made landfall in Odisha and weakened back down to a prominent low pressure system. Two days later, the IMD reupgraded the system into a depression over Madhya Pradesh. On 13 September, the depression finally dissipated over northwest Uttar Pradesh.

=== Deep Depression BOB 05 ===
- Deep depression (IMD)
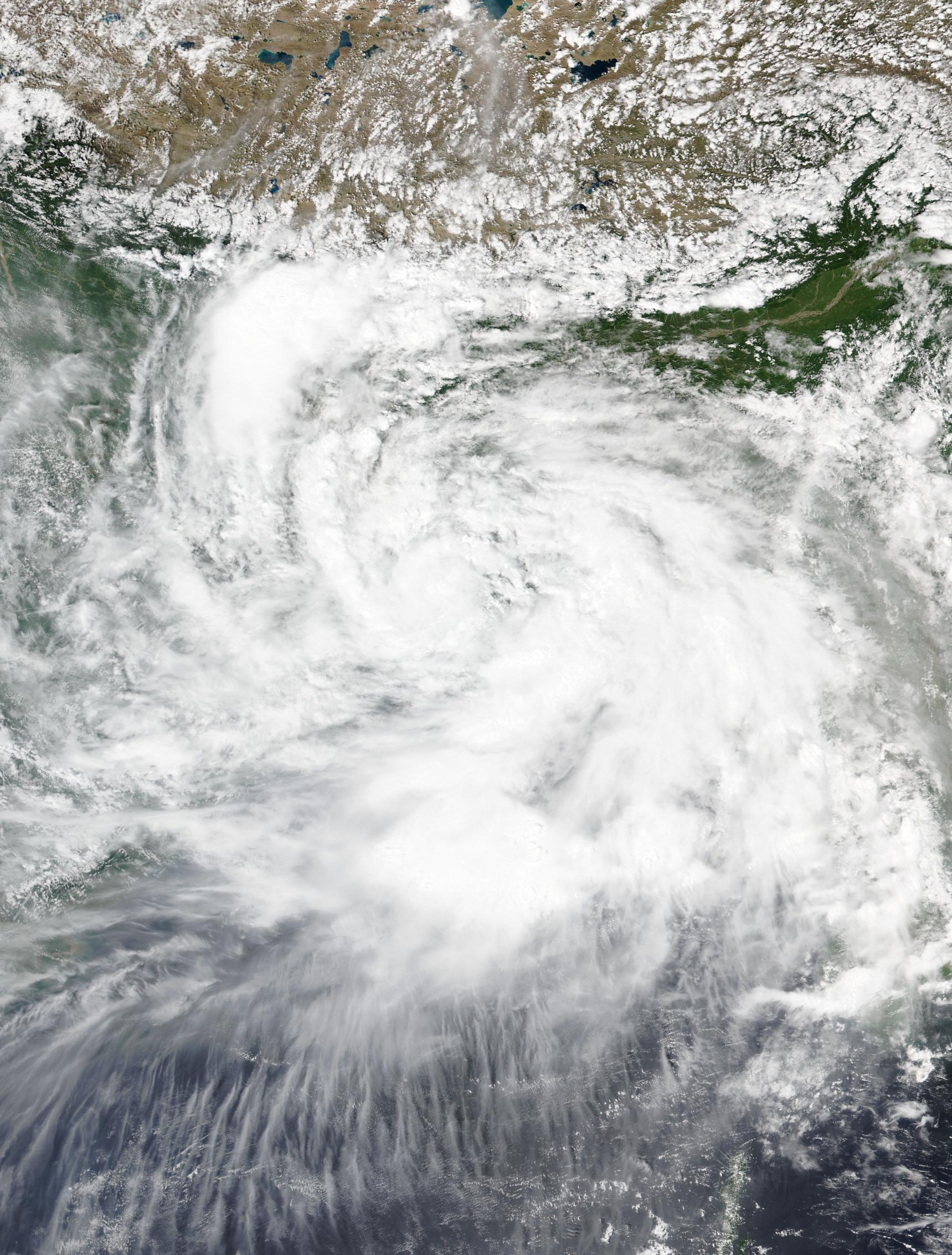
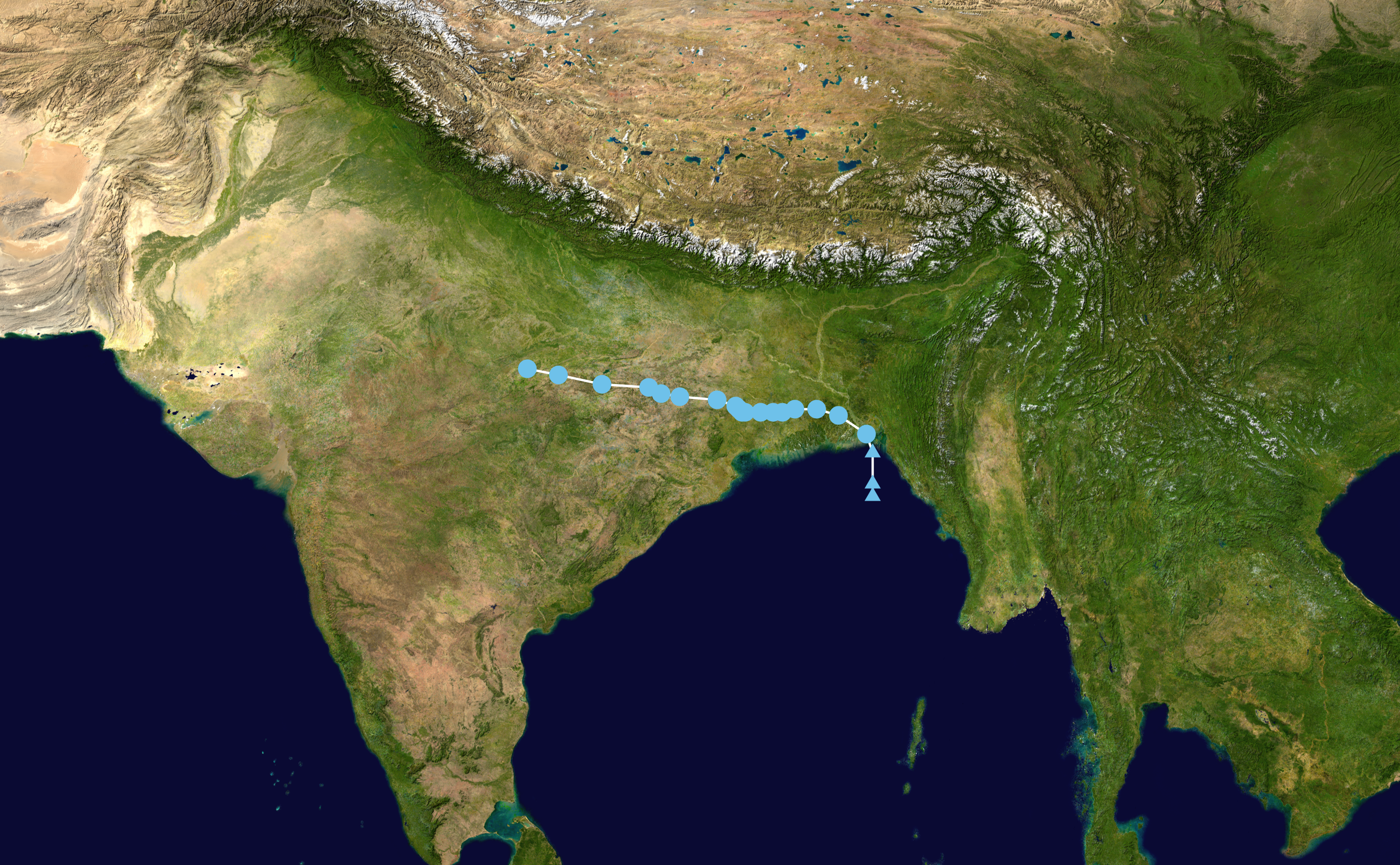
- Duration: 13 September – 17 September
- Peak intensity: 55 km/h (35 mph) (3-min); 989 hPa (mbar)

The remnants of Typhoon Yagi entered the basin, with the India Meteorological Department (IMD) to tracked a cyclonic circulation over Myanmar on 11 September. This disturbance would coalesce into a low-pressure area the next day, further developing into a well-marked low-pressure just a few hours later. Soon after, it developed into a depression. Early the next morning, it became a deep depression over Bangladesh and West Bengal. On 15 September, it weakened back down to a depression as it slowly moved westward over western India.

Due to heavy rain from this system, seven people were killed by landslides in Cox's Bazar District. Five fishermen also died and over 500 more went missing in the district. In Cox's Bazar, 378 mm (14.9 in) of rain was recorded within a 12-hour period from 11 to 12 September. These heavy rains resulted in the flooding of over 200 villages within seven upazilas of the district. Another 11 people were killed by flooding in Noakhali District, where 100 fishermen went missing. Additionally, two people were killed when a boat capsized in Jagannathpur Upazila. In India, heavy rains lashed Kolkata and West Bengal. 72.4 mm (2.85 in) of rain was recorded over a 24-hour period, with a total of 125.8 mm (4.95 in) was recorded in Kolkata.

Due to the heavy rains, the Damodar Valley Corporation released more than 3.5 lakh cusec of water from its dams, resulting in inundation of Birbhum, Bankura, Howrah, Hooghly, North and South 24 Parganas, Purba and Paschim Medinipur, and Paschim Bardhaman districts of West Bengal. 28 people were killed due to these floods and 25,000 people had to moved to safer areas.

=== Depression ARB 01 ===
- Depression (IMD)
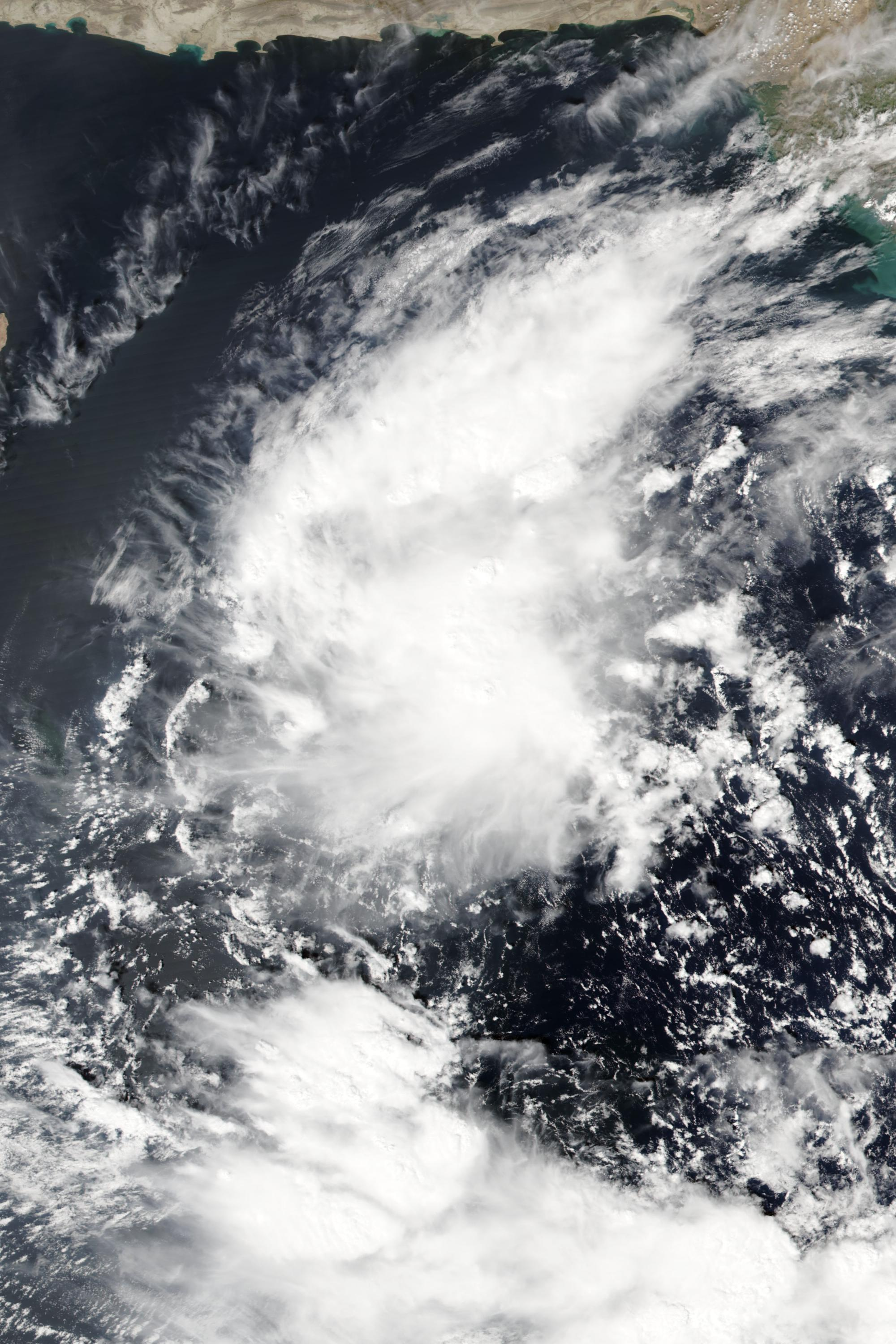
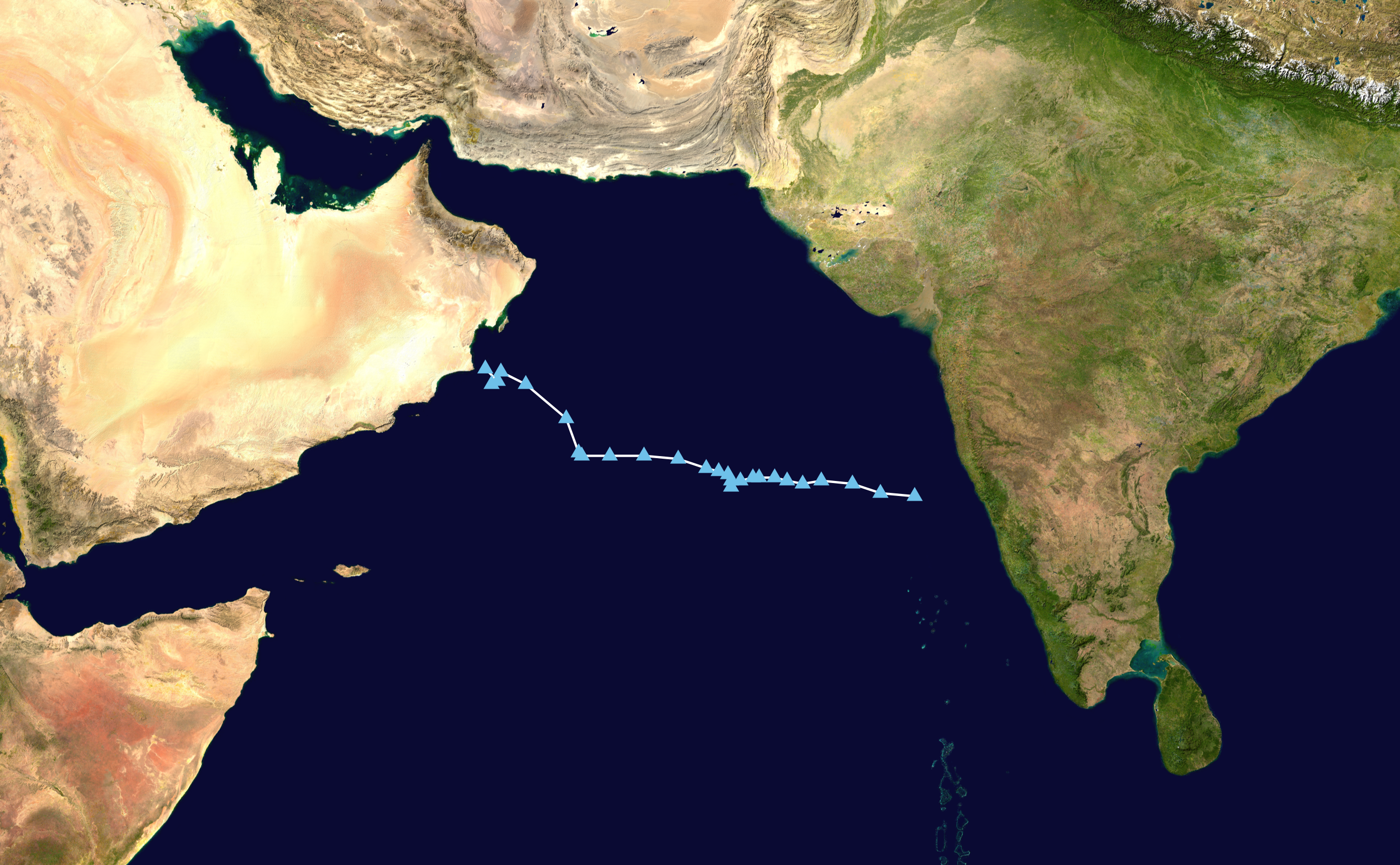
- Duration: 13 October – 15 October
- Peak intensity: 45 km/h (30 mph) (3-min); 1001 hPa (mbar)

Early on 9 October, a low-pressure area formed near Lakshadweep, becoming a well-marked low-pressure area the following day. At 12:00 UTC on 13 October, the disturbance organised into a depression as it tracked over the central Arabian Sea. The depression moved northwestward, making landfall near Duqm, Oman late on 15 October. It then disorganised inland, weakening into a well-marked low-pressure area over coastal Oman by 18:00 UTC that day.

=== Depression BOB 06 ===
- Depression (IMD)
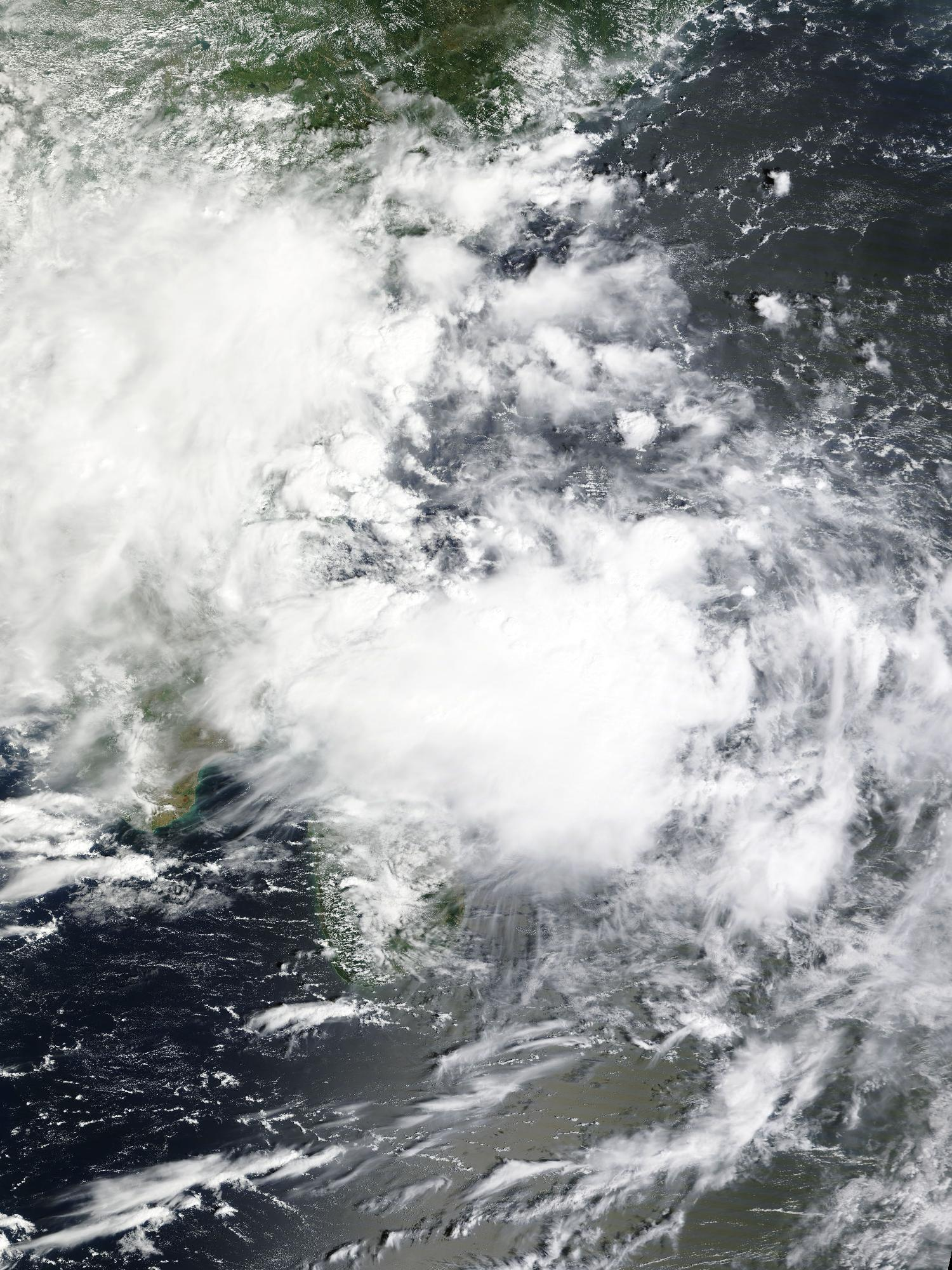
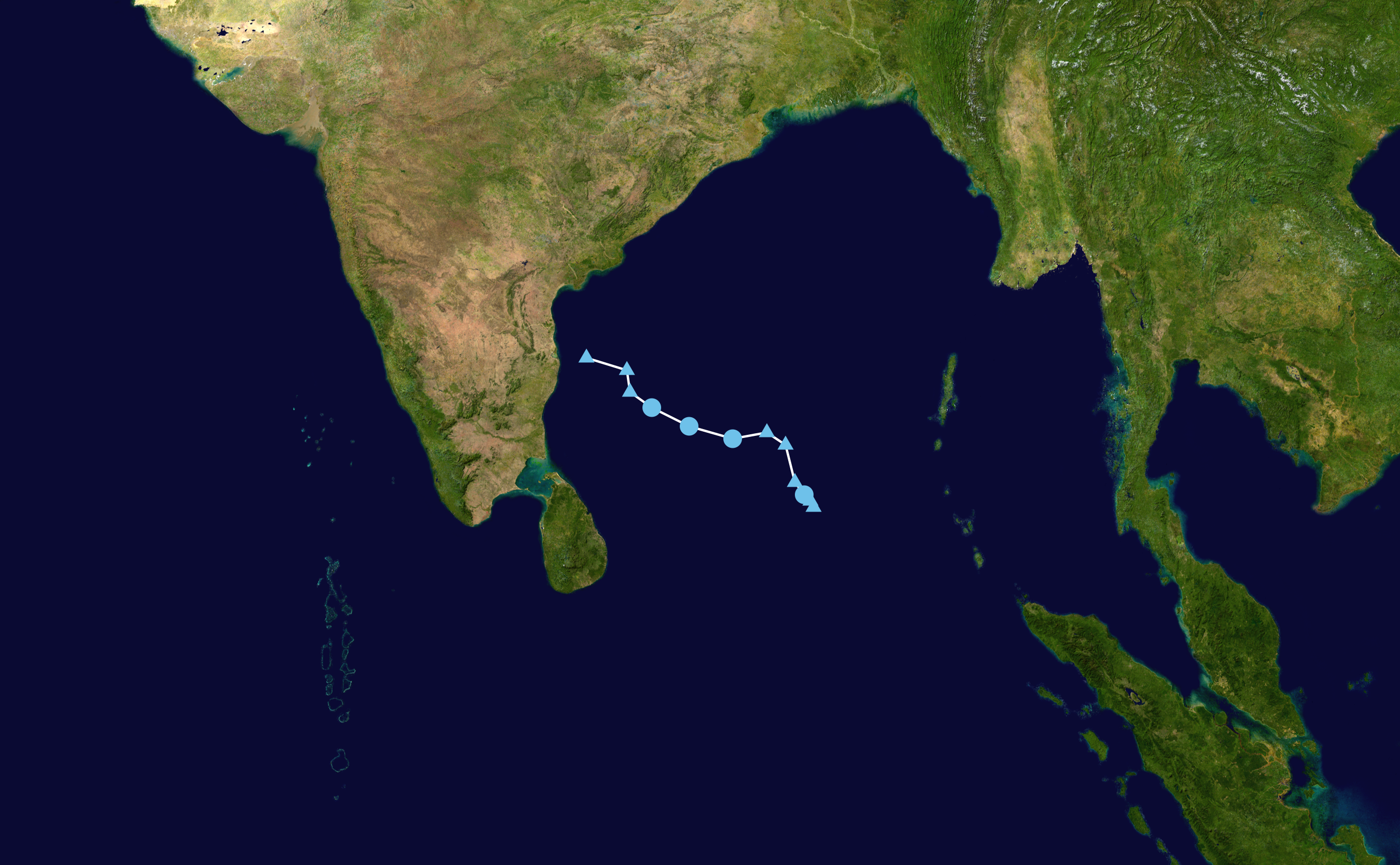
- Duration: 15 October – 17 October
- Peak intensity: 45 km/h (30 mph) (3-min); 1000 hPa (mbar)

On 14 October, a well marked low pressure area formed in the south of the Bay of Bengal. The IMD upgraded it to a depression, designating it as BOB 06, early on 15 October as it moved west-northwestwards before making landfall in Andhra Pradesh on 17 October at 04:30 IST. It weakened further into a low pressure area as it moved north-westwards into India and dissipated.

In the wake of this system, heavy rains slashed Puducherry, Chennai and other parts of Andhra Pradesh, bringing these areas to a standstill.Parts of north Chennai received 300 mm and city battered with 180-200 mm rainfall.Bengaluru and its adjoining areas too received heavy rainfall. Residential neighbourhoods and roads were inundated with knee-deep water, causing widespread disruptions to daily life. The relentless downpour led to traffic congestion, crippled public transportation services, and forced the cancellation of several flights. The Southern Railway announced the cancellation and diversion of several trains due to waterlogging.

=== Severe Cyclonic Storm Dana ===
- Severe cyclonic storm (IMD)
- Category 1 tropical cyclone (SSHWS)
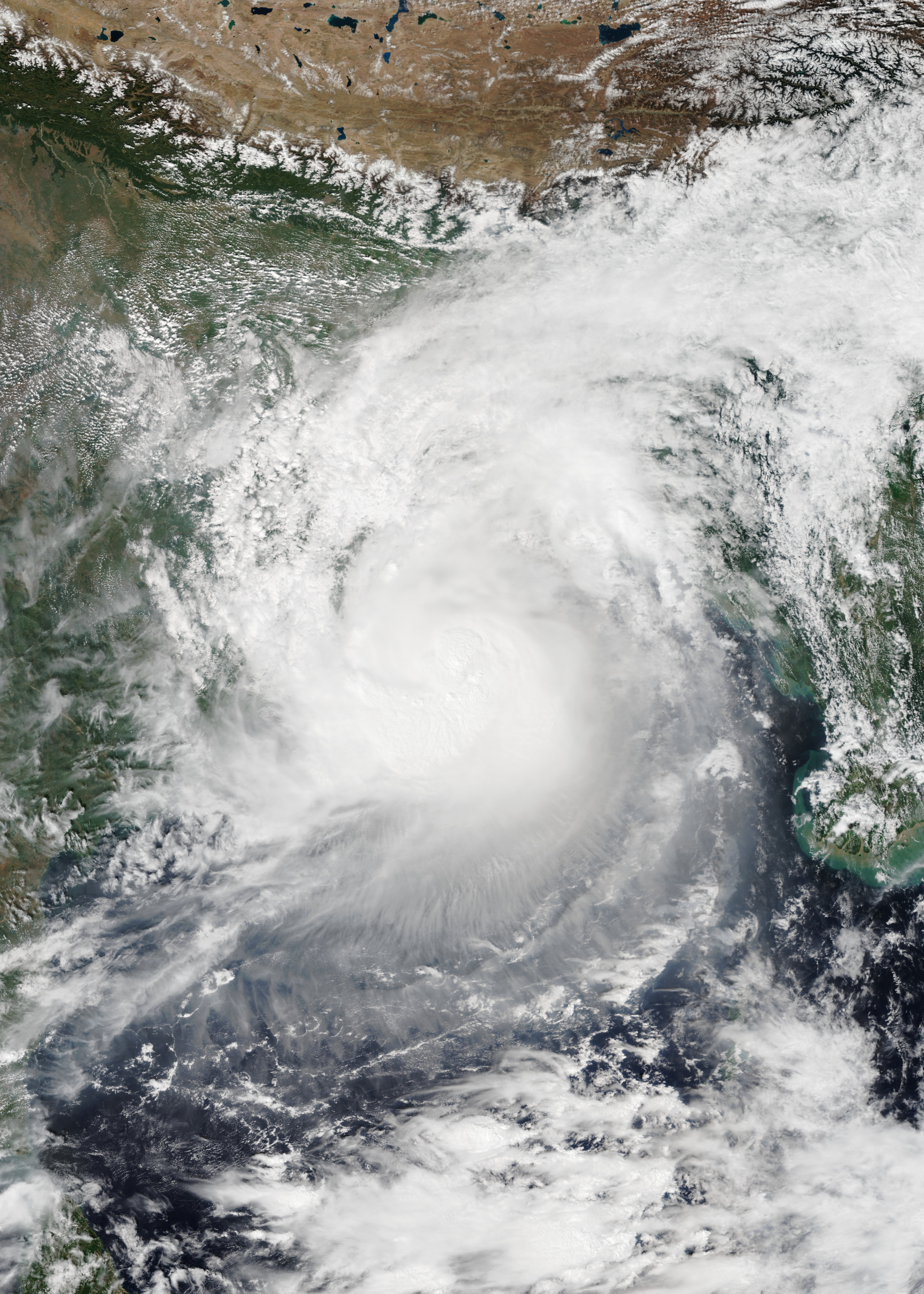
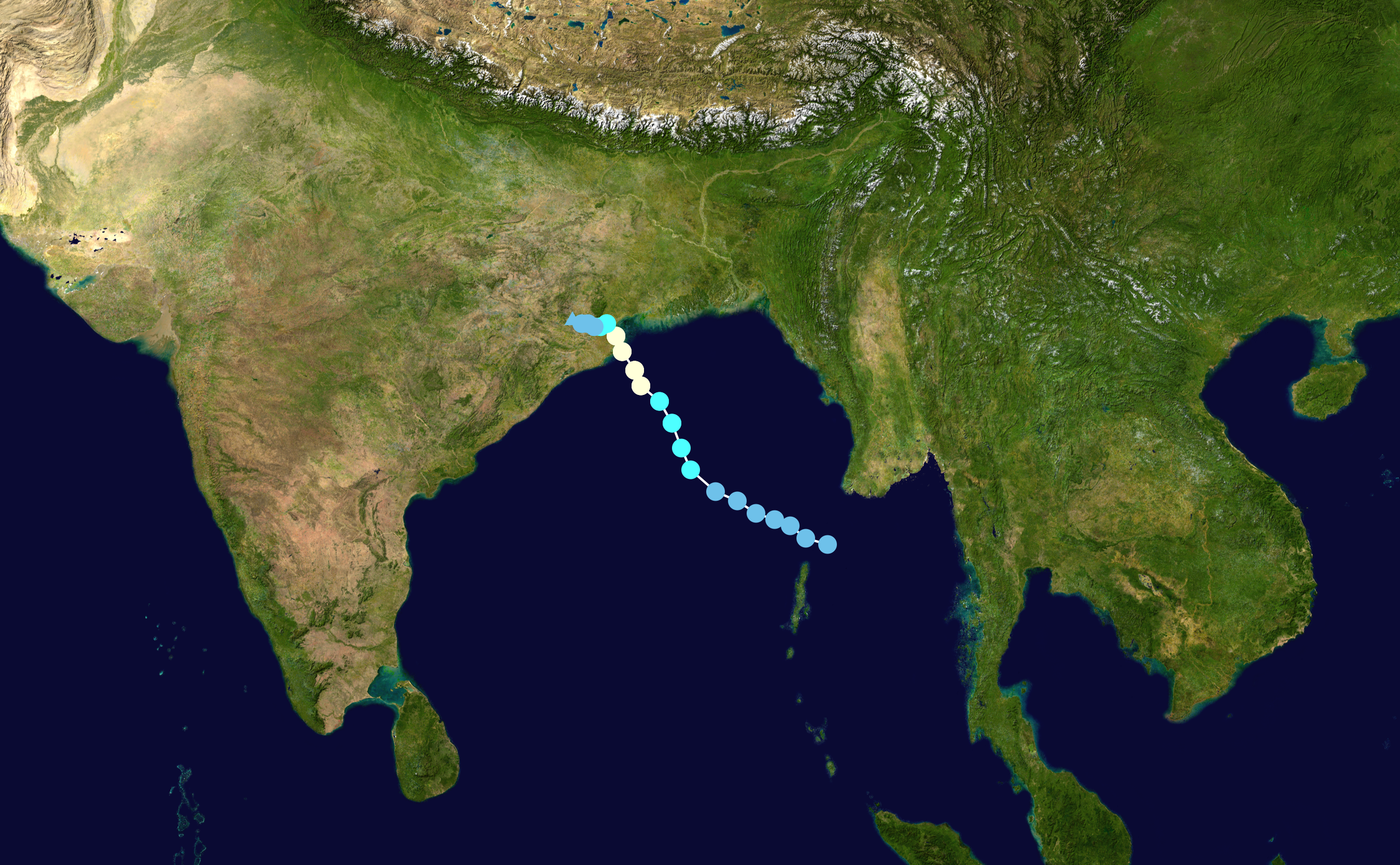
- Duration: 22 October – 26 October
- Peak intensity: 110 km/h (70 mph) (3-min); 986 hPa (mbar)

A low pressure area formed in the south Bay of Bengal on 20 October. On 21 October, it organised into a well-marked low pressure area. It strengthened into a depression on 22 October. The same day in the evening, it had consolidated into a deep depression and moving in a west-northwest direction. Over the next 6 hours, it intensified into cyclonic storm and was named Dana by the IMD. (Note: The name Dana (Arabic: دانة, [daːnə]) was contributed by Qatar and means "pearl" in Arabic.) On 23 October, it further intesified into a severe cyclonic storm. The system made landfall between 23:30 IST of 24 October and 08:30 IST of 25 October close to Habalikhati Nature Camp (Bhitarkanika) and Dhamra Port on the Odisha Coast, weakening into a cyclonic storm. It weakened into a deep depression at a distance of 40 km north-northwest of Bhadrak and then into a depression about 70 km east-southeast of Keonjhar and remained stationary over that area, weakening further into a remnant low and dissipated on 26 October.

=== Cyclonic Storm Fengal ===
- Cyclonic storm (IMD)
- Tropical storm (SSHWS)
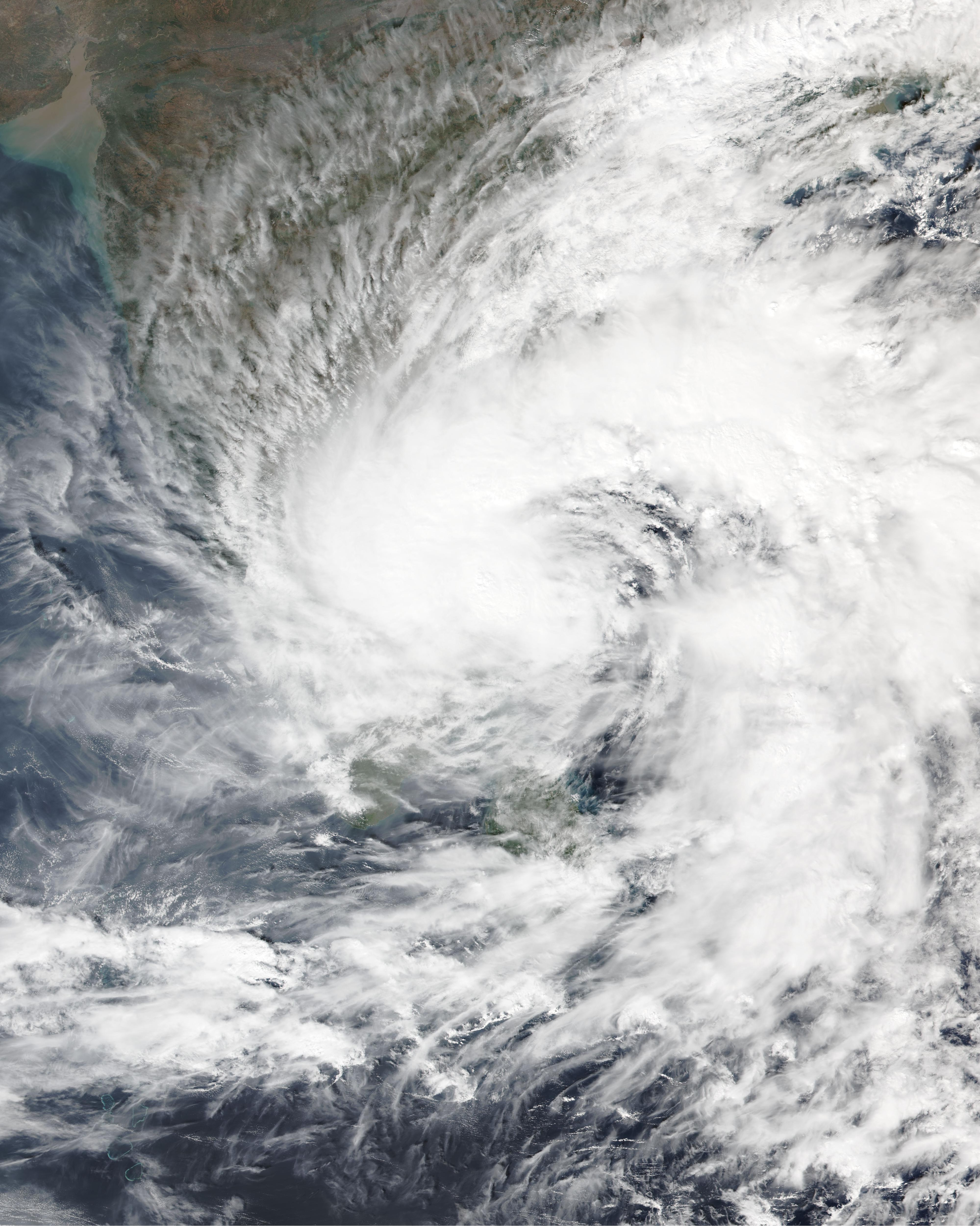
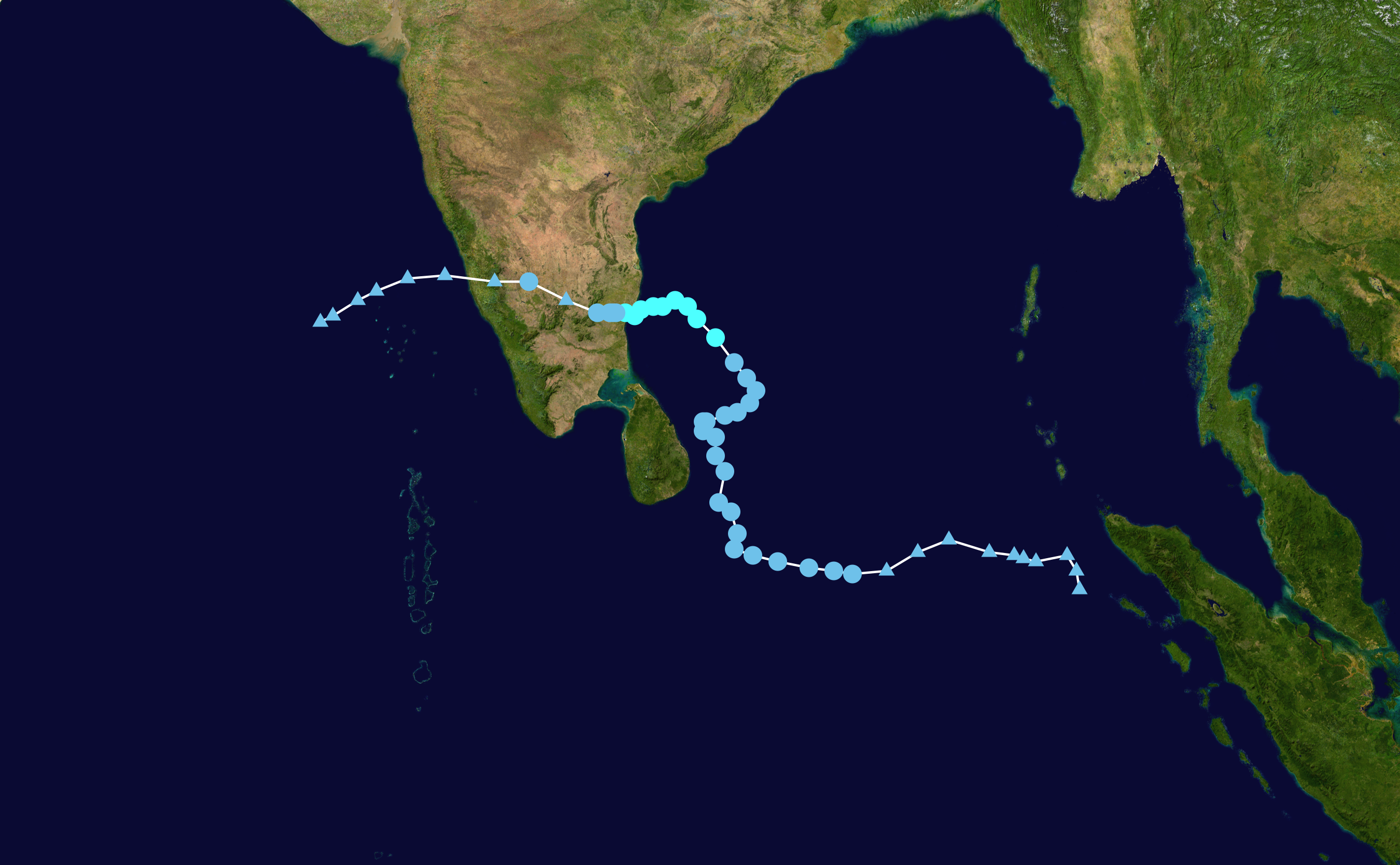
- Duration: 25 November – 1 December
- Peak intensity: 85 km/h (50 mph) (3-min); 996 hPa (mbar)

On 14 November, the Bureau of Meteorology noted that a tropical low could form west of Sumatra. Several days later, they noted that the tropical low was developing. Further consolidation due to a westerly wind burst led to the formation of a low-pressure area over Southeast Bay of Bengal and a deadly twin cyclone on 23 November. By 24 November, it intensified into a well-marked low pressure area. It intensified further into a depression on 25 November, moving northwestwards towards Tamil Nadu and Sri Lanka coast. On 26 November, it intensified further into a deep depression, later moving into Sri Lanka. On 29 November, the system strengthened into a cyclonic storm and hence was named Fengal (Note: The name Fengal (Arabic: فنجال, [fendʒaːl]) was contributed by Saudi Arabia and refers to a traditional finjan coffee cups in Arabic.) by the IMD. On 30 November, the cyclonic storm made landfall between Karaikal and Mahabalipuram close to Puducherry as a cyclonic storm. The next day, on 1 December, the remnants of the cyclone weakened to a deep depression and then further into a depression over the same region. It weakened further into a remnant low over north interior Tamil Nadu on 2 December. Subsequently, the system emerged over coastal Karnataka and proceeded into the Arabian Sea, and dissipated 2 days later.

=== Depression BOB 09 ===
- Depression (IMD)
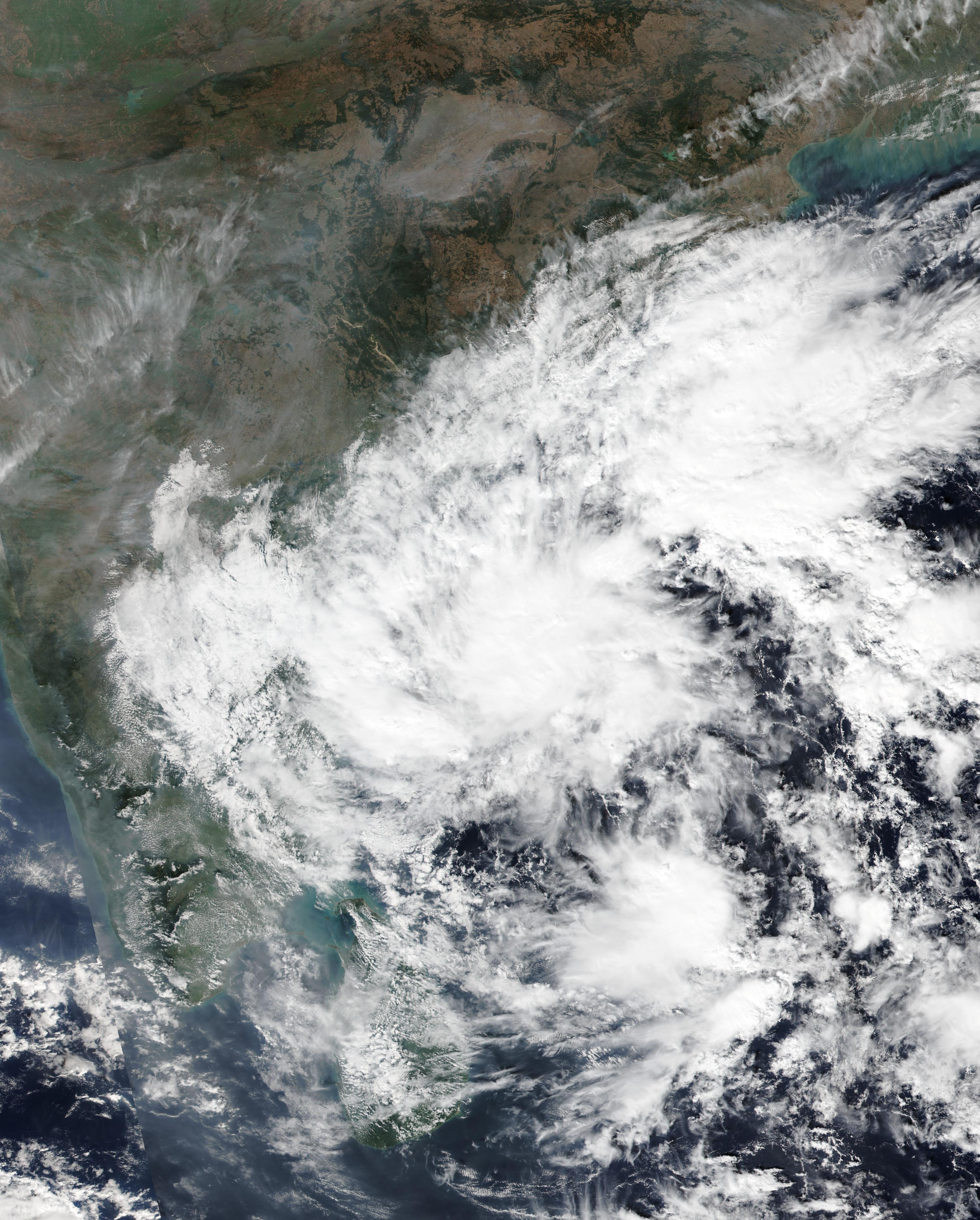
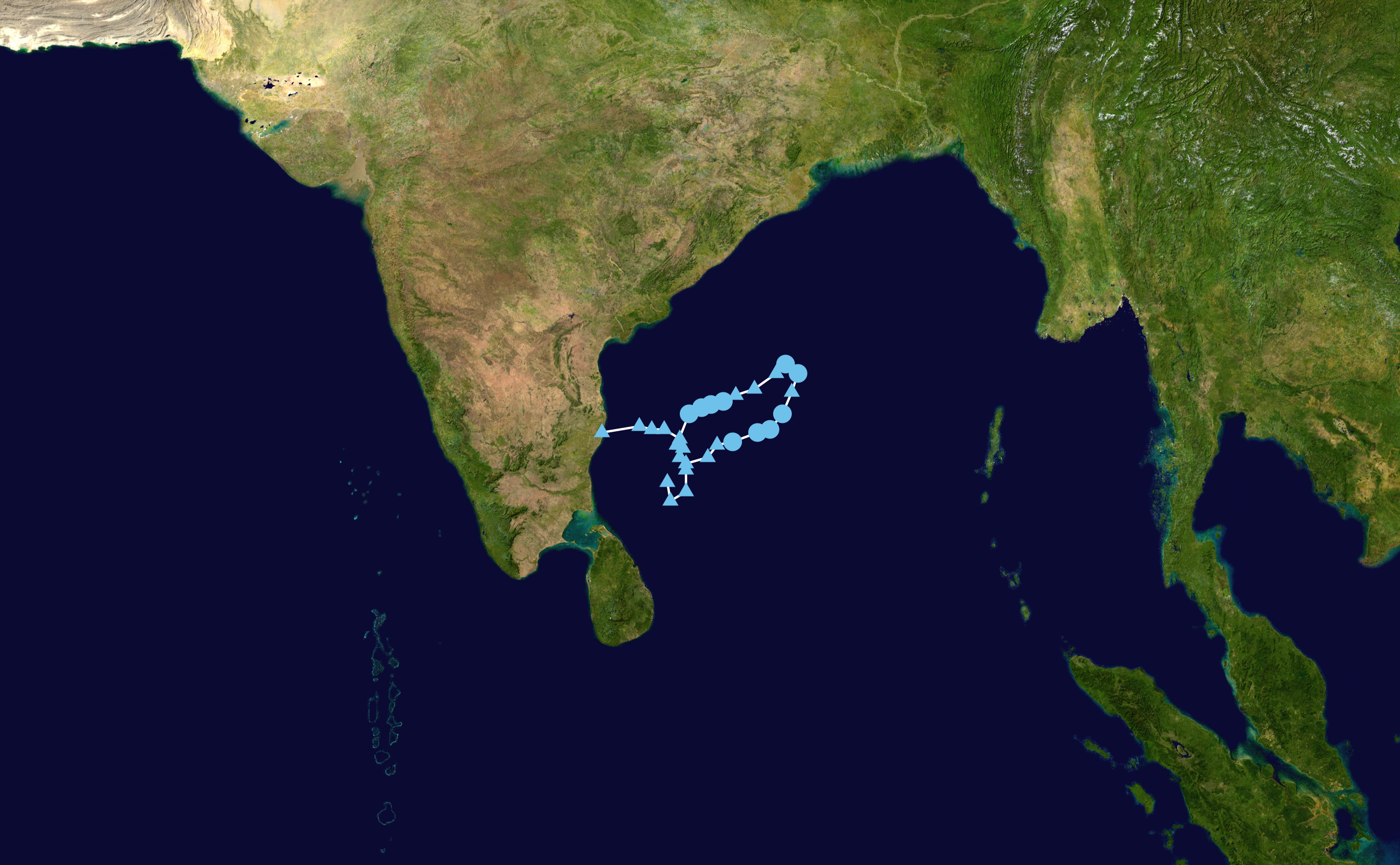
- Duration: 20 December – 21 December
- Peak intensity: 45 km/h (30 mph) (3-min); 1002 hPa (mbar)

On 16 December, A low-pressure area formed over the central part of southern Bay of Bengal. On 19 December, it intensified further into a well-marked low-pressure area. On 20 December, it intensified further into a depression and moved over the west-central Bay of Bengal near Andhra Pradesh. On 21 December, it weakened into a well-marked low pressure area.

== Storm names ==
Within this basin, a tropical cyclone is assigned a name when it is judged to have reached cyclonic storm intensity with winds of 65 km/h (40 mph). The names were selected by a new list from the Regional Specialized Meteorological Center in New Delhi by mid-2020. There is no retirement of tropical cyclone names in this basin as the list of names is only scheduled to be used once before a new list of names is drawn up. Should a named tropical cyclone move into the basin from other basins, like the western Pacific basin, then it will retain its original name. The names used for 2024 North Indian Ocean Cyclone Season are listed below.

- Remal
- Asna
- Dana
- Fengal

== Season effects ==
This is a table of all storms in the 2024 North Indian Ocean cyclone season. It mentions all of the season's storms and their names, duration, peak intensities according to the IMD storm scale, damage, and death totals. Damage and death totals include the damage and deaths caused when that storm was a precursor wave or extratropical low. All of the damage figures are in 2024 USD.

Name	Dates	Peak intensity			Areas affected	Damage (USD)	Deaths	Ref(s).
Name	Dates	Category	Wind speed	Pressure	Areas affected	Damage (USD)	Deaths	Ref(s).
Remal	24–28 May	Severe cyclonic storm	110 km/h (70 mph)	978 hPa (28.88 inHg)	India (Odisha, West Bengal, Jharkhand, Northeast India), Bangladesh, Myanmar	$637 million	61	
BOB 02	19–20 July	Depression	45 km/h (30 mph)	990 hPa (29.23 inHg)	Odisha	None	None	
LAND 01	2–6 August	Deep depression	55 km/h (35 mph)	988 hPa (29.18 inHg)	West Bengal, Jharkhand, Bihar, Uttar Pradesh, Madhya Pradesh, Rajasthan	None	None	
Asna	25 August – 2 September	Cyclonic storm	75 km/h (45 mph)	988 hPa (29.18 inHg)	Madhya Pradesh, Rajasthan, Gujarat, Pakistan	$30 million	73	
BOB 03	31 August – 2 September	Depression	45 km/h (30 mph)	996 hPa (29.41 inHg)	Andhra Pradesh, Telangana, Odisha	$1.55 billion	27	
BOB 04	8–13 September	Deep depression	55 km/h (35 mph)	991 hPa (29.26 inHg)	Odisha, Madhya Pradesh, Uttar Pradesh	None	None	
BOB 05	13–18 September	Deep depression	55 km/h (35 mph)	989 hPa (29.21 inHg)	Bangladesh, West Bengal, Jharkhand, Chhattisgarh, Madhya Pradesh, Uttar Pradesh	Unknown	53	
ARB 01	13–15 October	Depression	45 km/h (30 mph)	1001 hPa (29.56 inHg)	Oman	None	None	
BOB 06	15–17 October	Depression	45 km/h (30 mph)	1000 hPa (29.53 inHg)	Tamil Nadu, Andhra Pradesh, Puducherry, Karnataka	None	None	
Dana	22 October–26 October	Severe cyclonic storm	110 km/h (70 mph)	986 hPa (29.12 inHg)	Odisha, West Bengal, Chhattisgarh, Jharkhand, Karnataka, Andhra Pradesh, Bangladesh	$73.3 million	6	
Fengal	25 November – 1 December	Cyclonic storm	85 km/h (50 mph)	992 hPa (29.29 inHg)	Sri Lanka, Tamil Nadu, Andhra Pradesh, Kerala, Karnataka	$55 million	37	
BOB 09	20 December – 21 December	Depression	45 km/h (30 mph)	1002 hPa (29.59 inHg)	None	None	None	
Season aggregates
12 systems	24 May – 21 December		110 km/h (70 mph)	978 hPa (28.88 inHg)		$2.35 billion	257	

== See also ==
- Timeline of the 2024 North Indian Ocean cyclone season
- Tropical cyclones in 2024
- 2024 Atlantic hurricane season
- 2024 Pacific hurricane season
- 2024 Pacific typhoon season
- South-West Indian Ocean cyclone seasons: 2023–24, 2024–25
- Australian region cyclone seasons: 2023–24, 2024–25
- South Pacific cyclone seasons: 2023–24, 2024–25
