= Cyclone Fengal =

North Indian Ocean cyclone in 2024

Cyclonic Storm Fengal
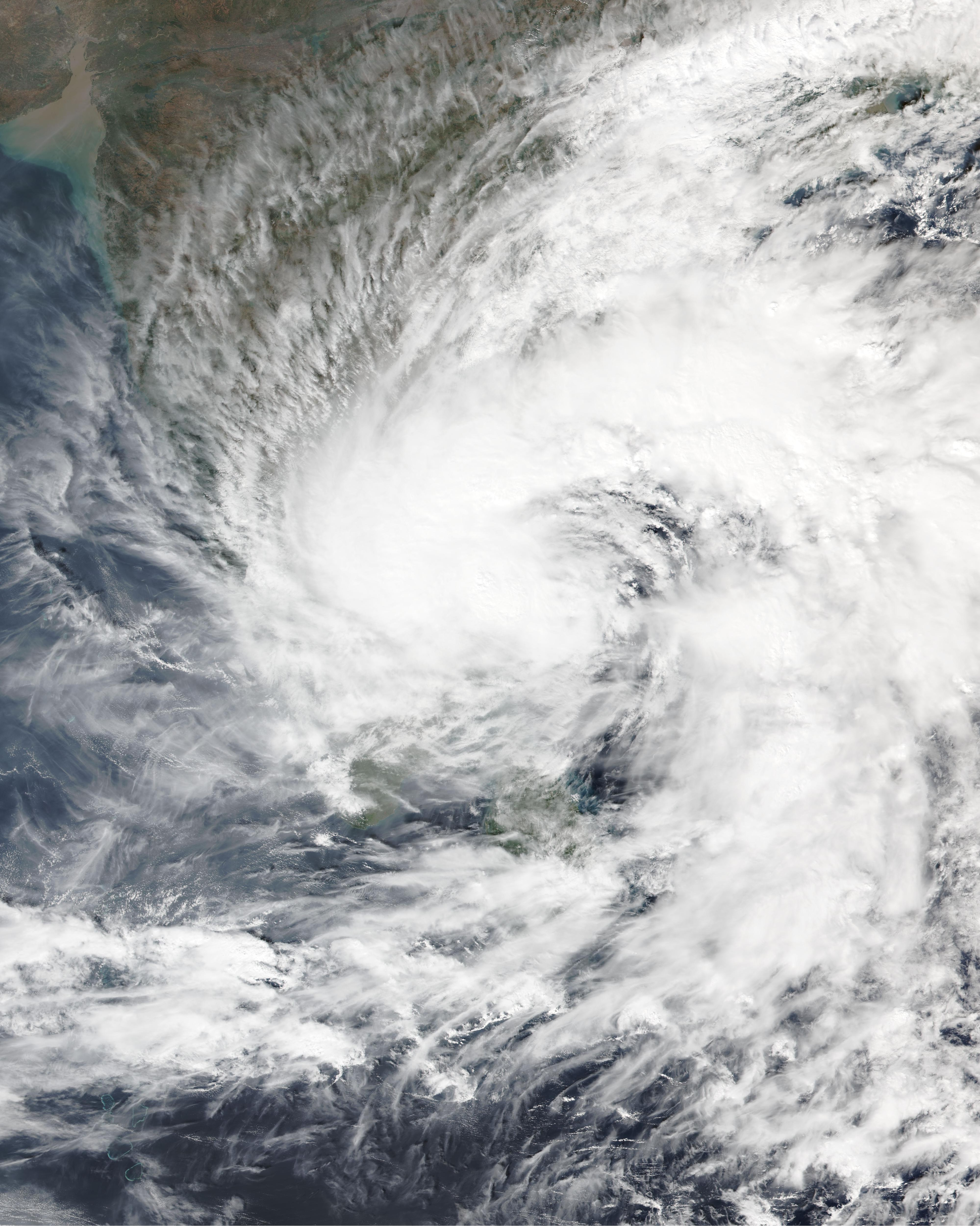
- Fengal at peak intensity nearing landfall in Southern India on November 30.

Meteorological history
- Formed: 25 November 2024
- Post-tropical: 1 December 2024
- Dissipated: 4 December 2024

Cyclonic storm
- 3-minute sustained (IMD)
- Highest winds: 85 km/h (50 mph)
- Highest gusts: 100 km/h (65 mph)
- Lowest pressure: 996 hPa (mbar); 29.41 inHg

Tropical storm
- 1-minute sustained (SSHWS/JTWC)
- Highest winds: 85 km/h (50 mph)
- Highest gusts: 110 km/h (70 mph)
- Lowest pressure: 991 hPa (mbar); 29.26 inHg

Overall effects
- Fatalities: 37 (20 in India, 17 in Sri Lanka)
- Injuries: 20
- Missing: 50
- Damage: $55 million (2024 USD)
- Areas affected: Southern India, Sri Lanka
- IBTrACS
- Part of the 2024 North Indian Ocean cyclone season

Cyclonic Storm Fengal (Note: The name Fengal (Arabic: فنجال, [fendʒaːl]) was contributed by Saudi Arabia and refers to a traditional finjan coffee cups in Arabic.) was a deadly tropical cyclone that brought significant flooding and damage to Southern India and Sri Lanka. The fourth and final cyclonic storm of the 2024 North Indian Ocean cyclone season, Fengal originated from a tropical disturbance off the coast of Sumatra, Indonesia on 14 November. It killed at least 37 people; 20 in India and 17 in Sri Lanka, along with 20 injuries. Economic losses reached $55 million.

== Meteorological history ==
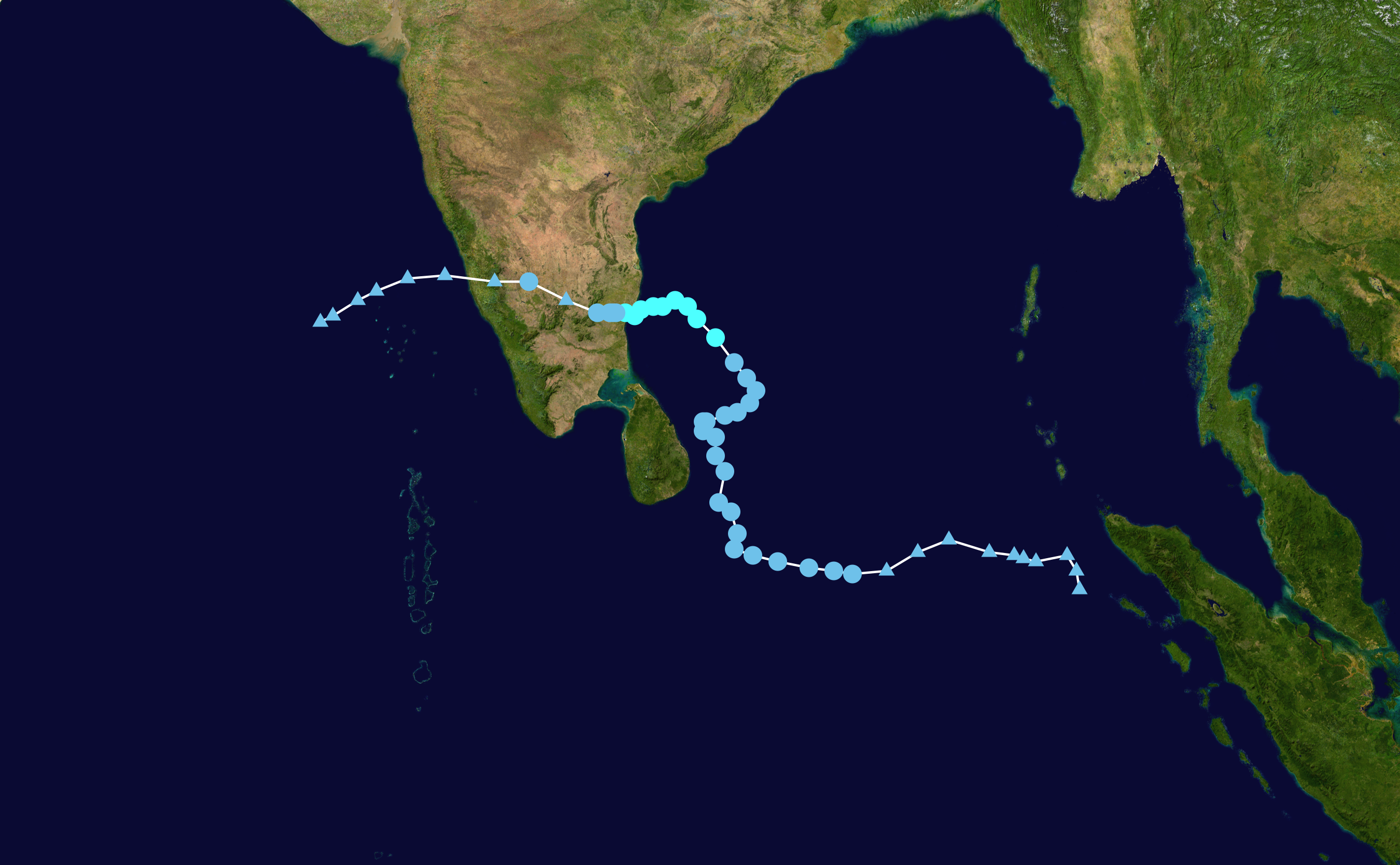
Map plotting the storm's track and intensity, according to the Saffir–Simpson scale Map key Saffir–Simpson scale Tropical depression (≤38 mph, ≤62 km/h) Tropical storm (39–73 mph, 63–118 km/h) Category 1 (74–95 mph, 119–153 km/h) Category 2 (96–110 mph, 154–177 km/h) Category 3 (111–129 mph, 178–208 km/h) Category 4 (130–156 mph, 209–251 km/h) Category 5 (≥157 mph, ≥252 km/h) Unknown Storm type Tropical cyclone Subtropical cyclone Extratropical cyclone, remnant low, tropical disturbance, or monsoon depression

On 14 November, the Australian Bureau of Meteorology noted the potential formation of a tropical low west of Sumatra, Indonesia. The tropical low formed a few days later due to the occurrence of a westerly wind burst. As the low formed, it led to the formation of an invest on 18 November, designated as 96S by the JTWC. It later formed a deadly twin cyclone. Another invest was formed on 21 November, designated as 99B. This invest struggled to develop initially due to the presence of strong wind shear with convection spread all the way from the Malay Peninsula to Sri Lanka. Subsequently, it organised itself into a low pressure area on 23 November.

As it moved westward, the India Meteorological Department (IMD) began tracking the system for potential tropical cyclogenesis. It strengthened into a depression on 25 November while it moved northwestwards towards Tamil Nadu and Sri Lanka coast. On 26 November at 01:30 IST, JTWC issued it a Tropical Cyclone Formation Alert on the depression as it began to move northward, paralleling the Coromandel coast. On the same day, in southwestern parts of Bay of Bengal, it intensified further into a deep depression, later moving into Sri Lanka. It continued moving parallel to the Coromandel coast and by 27 November, it was located 490 km south-southeast of Chennai. The JTWC noted that the system showed highly disorganized but persistent areas of convection. It was in a marginal environment for tropical cyclogenesis with high vertical wind shear just northeast of Sri Lanka limiting further intensification. On 28 November, the system maintained its intensity and moved north-northwestwards at a speed of 9 km/h. By 14:30 IST on 29 November, the system became organized and strengthened into a cyclonic storm, given the name Fengal by the IMD. At that time, it was 300 km southeast of Chennai and moved of 13 km/h.

On the early morning of 30 November, Fengal reached its peak intensity with 3-minute sustained winds of 85 km/h. The JTWC recorded a 1-minute sustained winds 95 km/h and a pressure of 987 hPa as it moves westward toward Southern India at the same time. It made landfall near Puducherry and Marakkanam regions between Karaikal and Mababalipuram coasts on the evening of 30 November and weakened slightly due to land interaction and wind shear. The next day on 1 December, the system had weakened to a deep depression by 11:30 IST at a distance of 30 km north of Cuddalore. The same day by 17:30 IST, the remnant of the cyclone weakened further into a depression over the same region. It weakened further into a remnant low over north interior Tamil Nadu on 2 December. The next day on 3 December, the system emerged over coastal Karnataka, proceeded into the Arabian Sea and dissipated on 4 December.

== Preparation ==
As Fengal formed, the IMD issued a red alert for the states of Tamil Nadu, southern Andhra Pradesh, Kerala, and Karnataka as extremely heavy rainfall was expected. As Fengal approached India, the Puducherry government closed all schools in its district until 30 November. Fishermen were advised to halt fishing and move their boats to higher ground in anticipation of Fengal's landfall over Puducherry. Chennai's Meenambakkam Airport suspended operations until the morning of 1 December.

== Impact ==
=== Sri Lanka ===
As Fengal crossed Sri Lanka in depression stage, it caused significant damage. Nearly 480,000 people were displaced, 17 were killed and 20 were injured, with 103 homes destroyed and 2,635 others damaged.

=== India ===
In Tiruvannamalai, 10 people died; seven from a landslide, two from drowning and another due to electrocution. Heavy rains of up to 130 mm (5.1 in) also caused severe flooding in Chennai, resulting in four deaths from electrocution. In Ooty, heavy rains caused a house to collapse, killing a 45-year-old man. Additionally, four people were killed in Pondicherry and another in Vellore. Flooding inundated around 800 acres of farmland in Nagapattinam. The remnant of the cyclone brought torrential rainfall in various districts of Tamil Nadu and left a trail of floods. Uthangarai in Krishnagiri district recorded 50 cm of rain in 24 hours. Places such as Mailam (50 cm), Tindivanam (38 cm), Kedar (42 cm), Soorapattu (38 cm), Mundiyampakkam (32 cm), Villupuram town (35 cm), Koliyanur (32 cm) and Marakkanam (24.04 cm) in Viluppuram district, Harur (33 cm) in Dharmapuri district, and Thirupalapandal (32 cm) and Madampoondi (31 cm) in Kallakurichi district were also affected. Preliminary damage of the cyclone was estimated to be Rs150 crore (US$17.7 million).

== See also ==
- Tropical cyclones in 2024
- Weather of 2024
- Cyclone Thane - A strong tropical cyclone that struck the same region.
- Cyclone Nilam - A similarly strength tropical cyclone that brought flooding to the same region.
- Cyclone Robyn (2024) - The twin cyclone of Fengal, also a deadly cyclone that brought flooding to Indonesia and killed more than 40 people.
