= Cyclone Belal =

South-West Indian Ocean tropical cyclone in 2024

Tropical Cyclone Belal
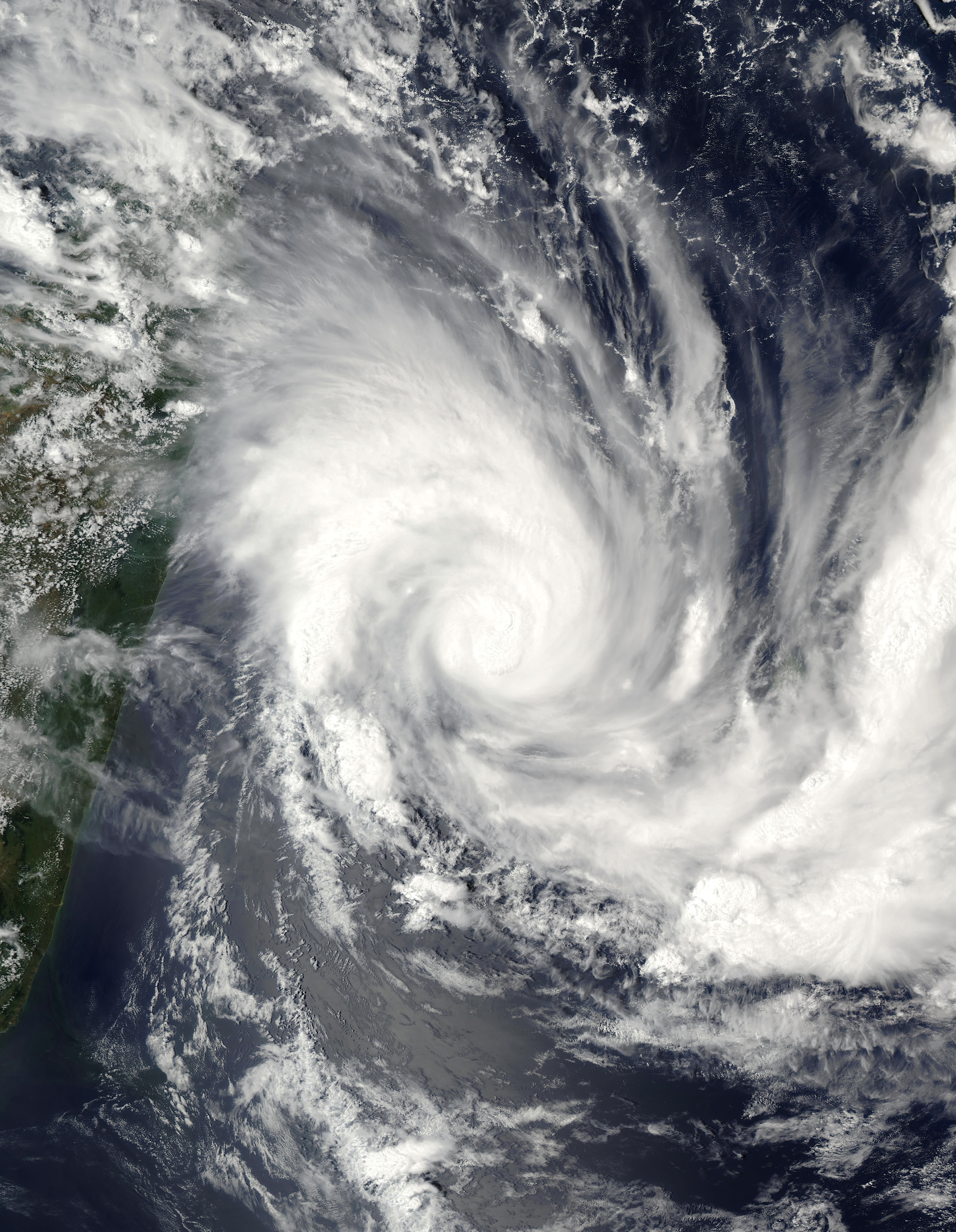
- Belal near peak intensity, approaching Réunion on 14 January

Meteorological history
- Formed: 11 January 2024
- Post-tropical: 18 January 2024
- Dissipated: 23 January 2024

Tropical cyclone
- 10-minute sustained (MFR)
- Highest winds: 140 km/h (85 mph)
- Lowest pressure: 968 hPa (mbar); 28.59 inHg

Category 2-equivalent tropical cyclone
- 1-minute sustained (SSHWS/JTWC)
- Highest winds: 165 km/h (105 mph)
- Lowest pressure: 969 hPa (mbar); 28.61 inHg

Overall effects
- Fatalities: 6 total
- Damage: $275 million (2024 USD)
- Areas affected: Mascarene Islands
- IBTrACS
- Part of the 2023–24 South-West Indian Ocean cyclone season

Tropical Cyclone Belal was the first tropical cyclone to make landfall over Réunion since Hondo in 2008, and the strongest to strike the island since Firinga in 1989. The second named storm of the 2023–24 South-West Indian Ocean cyclone season, Belal was first identified as a disturbance east of Agaléga in early January 2024. On 11 January, the Météo-France upgraded it to tropical depression and began monitoring it. By 13 January, it intensified to moderate tropical storm and received the name Belal. On the next day, Belal attained tropical cyclone status and turned southeastward, headed towards the island of Réunion. Belal reached its peak intensity with winds of 140 km/h (85 mph) and strike the northeastern part of Réunion on 15 January. Belal gradually weakened after passing the Mascarene Islands, and lost tropical characteristics on 18 January. The system then executing an anti-clockwise loop south of Rodrigues, before dissipating on 23 January.

Belal brought strong winds and heavy rainfall to Réunion, which caused flooding and power outages across the island. Belal also affected Mauritius and brought torrential rain to the nation. In all, six fatalities were associated with Belal. Arthur J. Gallagher & Co. estimated the total damage was $275 million (2024 USD).

== Meteorological history ==
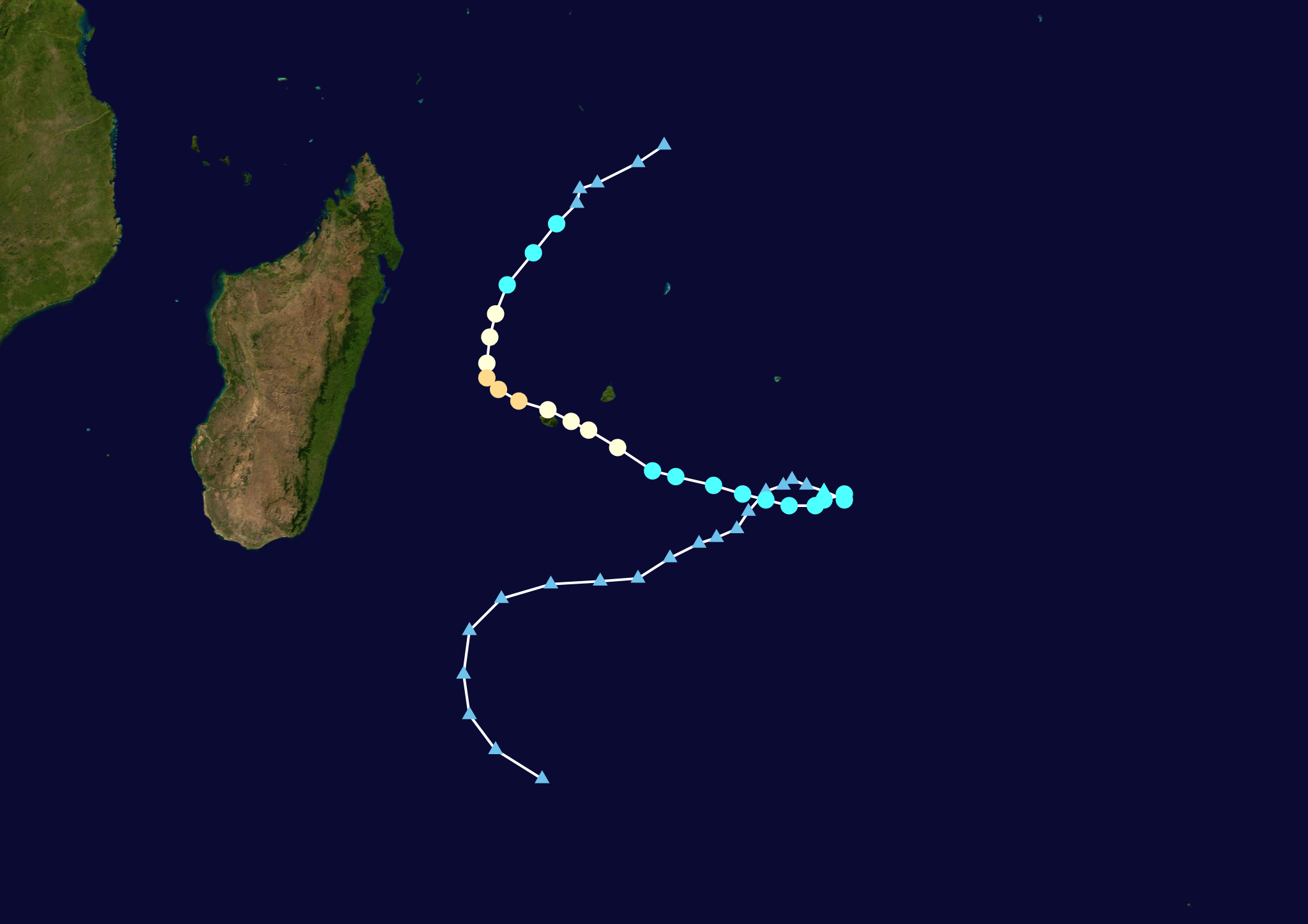
Map plotting the storm's track and intensity, according to the Saffir–Simpson scale Map key Saffir–Simpson scale Tropical depression (≤38 mph, ≤62 km/h) Tropical storm (39–73 mph, 63–118 km/h) Category 1 (74–95 mph, 119–153 km/h) Category 2 (96–110 mph, 154–177 km/h) Category 3 (111–129 mph, 178–208 km/h) Category 4 (130–156 mph, 209–251 km/h) Category 5 (≥157 mph, ≥252 km/h) Unknown Storm type Tropical cyclone Subtropical cyclone Extratropical cyclone, remnant low, tropical disturbance, or monsoon depression

On 11 January, the Météo-France of Réunion (MFR) noted a tropical disturbance forming about 1,300 km (810 mi) north-northeast of Réunion, east of Agaléga, in an area that the agency had been monitoring for several days. On the next day, the MFR and the Joint Typhoon Warning Center (JTWC) upgraded the system to a tropical depression, as it moved southwestward due to a low-level ridge to its southeast. Despite affecting by moderate wind shear, the system benefited by other favourable conditions including high sea surface temperature and moist air mass. Early on 13 January, MFR upgraded the system to a moderate tropical storm, about 700 km (430 mi) north of Réunion. Concurrently, the Mauritius Meteorological Services (MMS) assigned the name Belal. The JTWC also upgraded the system to a tropical storm shortly afterwards. Later that day, Belal strengthened to a severe tropical storm as it turned south-southwestward.

Early on 14 January, Belal rapidly intensified and attained tropical cyclone status, at about 370 km (230 mi) northwest of Réunion, as the system displayed a well-defined eye on microwave imagery and radar imagery. The JTWC also upgraded Belal to a Category 1–equivalent tropical cyclone. Belal began to curve southeastward under the influence of a ridge to its northeast. At 18:00 UTC, Belal reached its peak intensity with 10-minute sustained winds of 140 km/h (85 mph) and a barometric pressure of 968 hPa (28.59 inHg). Nine hours later, the JTWC assessed that Belal peaked with 1-minute sustained winds of 165 km/h (105 mph), equivalent to a Category 2 on the Saffir–Simpson scale. At 12:00 p.m. RET (08:00 UTC) 15 January, Belal made landfall in Sainte-Anne, Réunion, with winds of 130 km/h (80 mph). This marked the first time that a tropical cyclone with hurricane-force winds struck the island since Colina in 1993.

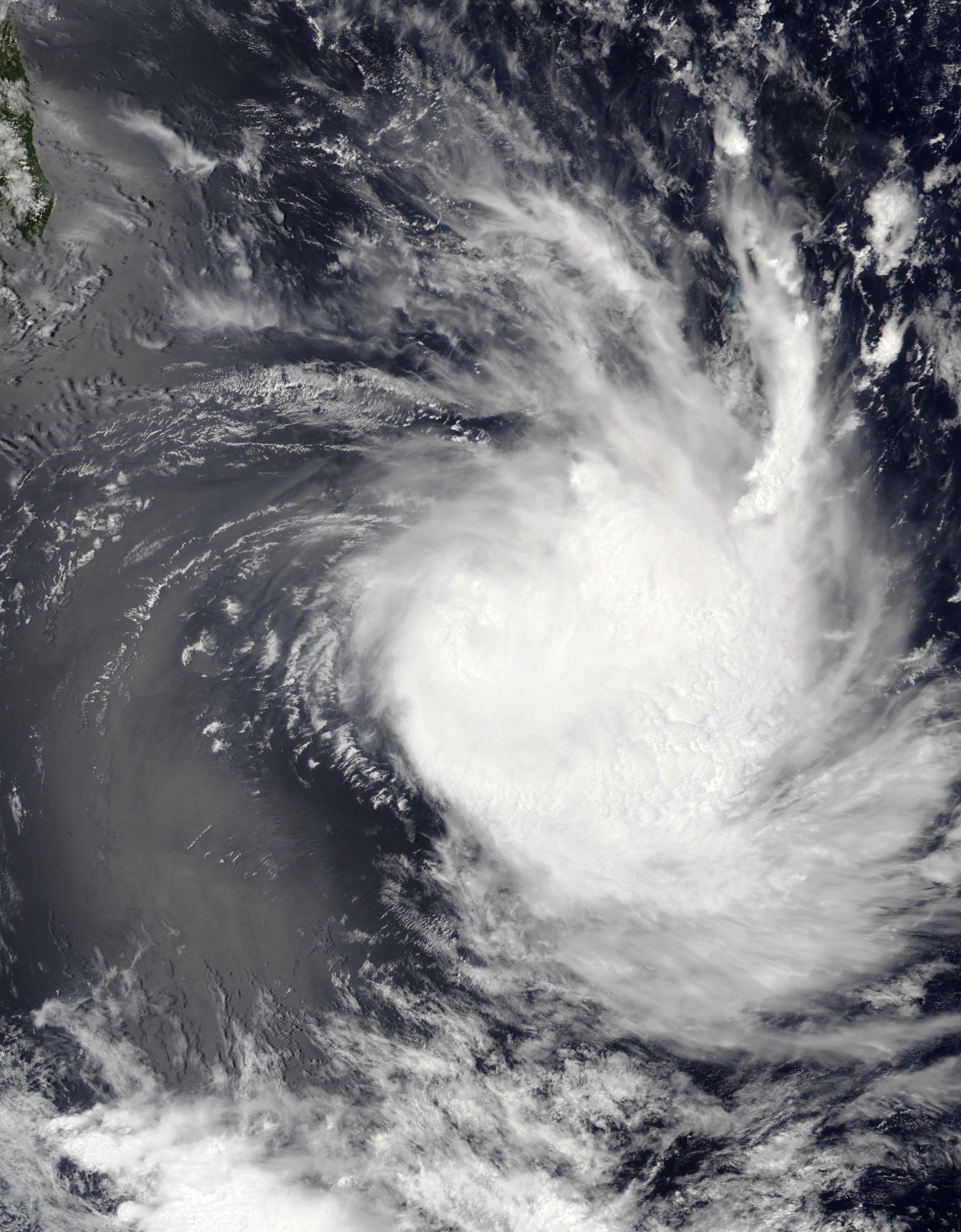
Cyclone Belal brushed Réunion on 15 January

Belal began to weaken after passing Réunion. On 16 January, the MFR downgraded Belal to a severe tropical storm, due to combined effects of increasing wind shear and land interaction. The JTWC downgraded Belal to tropical storm at the same instant. On the next day, the MFR further downgraded Belal to a moderate tropical storm, as dry air intruded the center of the storm and Belal was encountering cooler waters. The storm turned to the east, as it was driven by a ridge. On 18 January, Belal re-intensified slightly and became a severe tropical storm again. Early 19 January, the MFR re-classified Belal as a residual depression and issued the final bulletin for the system, as it continued to weaken under hostile environment. The JTWC also issued its final advisory on Belal at the same time. However, in post-season analysis, the MFR revealed that Belal became a filling low late on 18 January. The system then executed an anti-clockwise loop south of Rodrigues, before dissipated on 23 January.

== Preparations ==
On 13 January, Réunion was placed under orange alert as Belal was forecasted to pass directly over the island, while Mauritius has been placed under Class I cyclone warnings. Despite not anticipating a direct hit, heavy rains and strong winds were still expected to bring significant impact on the island.

As Belal continued to approach Réunion, the cyclone alert was raised to red by MFR on 14 January, until the morning of 16 January. Early on 15 January, the MFR raised the cyclone alert to purple, the highest alert level of the island. The entire population was told to stay indoors and emergency services were suspended. Forecasting to passed directly over Réunion as an intense tropical cyclone, Belal was considered as the strongest cyclone to strike the island since Firinga in 1989. Around 600 people were admitted to shelters. The Roland Garros Airport, in the commune of Sainte-Marie, and all public transport stopped in the afternoon locally. Officials said that additional resources from Civil Security would arrive in the coming days, as soon as it would be possible to land a plane safely at the airport.

On 15 January, the MMS raised the alert level to Class III. The Sir Seewoosagur Ramgoolam International Airport, government offices and schools on the island were closed.

== Impact and aftermath ==
Satellite loop of Belal passing over Réunion on 15 January

=== Réunion ===
Gusts of 170 km/h (110 mph) were reported in Saint-Denis, and up to 217 km/h (135 mph) at Maïdo. On the coast, the waves reached almost 10 m (33 ft) and the storm surge caused coastal flooding. More than 600 mm (24 in) of rain fell on Plaine des Palmistes, in the center of the island. From 13 to 16 January, the total rainfall were recorded as follows: 1,367 mm (53.8 in) at the Commerson Crater, 1,019 mm (40.1 in) at the Plaine des Palmistes, 982 mm (38.7 in) at Grand-Îlet (Salazie), 931 mm (36.7 in) at Plaine des Cafres, 836 mm (32.9 in) at La Nouvelle (Mafate), and 816 mm (32.1 in) at Cilaos. Near the northern and eastern coast, Le Port recorded 211 mm (8.3 in), Baril (Saint-Philippe) recorded 469 mm (18.5 in), and la Possession recorded 402 mm (15.8 in). Hourly rainfall was 112 mm (4.4 in) in Commerson Crater and Takamaka.

On 15 January, it was reported that a homeless person died in Saint-Gilles. At least 57,000 people, or 13% of homes, experienced power outage, and approximately 35,000 people experienced water shortage but that no essential infrastructure was affected. Strong swells were observed with waves averaging 8 m (26 ft) and heavy rain lashing the island. On 16 January, the authorities updated that 150,000 people, or 35% of Electricité de France's customers, were experiencing power outage. 130,000 people had no access to drinking water. On the same day, two more homeless people were found dead, the first was found on a stream bed near Cirque de Salazie, and the other one was found in a sheet metal hut in Le Tampon. A man died from carbon monoxide poisoning from fumes through his generator used during power outage. France Assureurs assessed the total damage was about €100 million (US$108 million).

On 16 January, reconnaissance missions began with 140 civil security agents, firefighters, gendarmes, and agents of the electricity network manager Enedis from Var and Mayotte to help rebuild local emergency services. On January 20, Electricité de France reported that 98% of the 150,000 customers initially affected by the power outages had their power restored. There were still 1.5% of the population without water.

=== Mauritius ===
On 15 January, authorities reported the death of a motorcyclist swept away in the floods in Les Pailles. Torrential rains flooded the streets and turned them into rivers, sweeping away vehicles and piling them up. Belal caused flooding in Port Louis, the nation's capital. Vehicles were swept away by floodwaters. Damages were worse than expected, as Belal carried winds of 110 km/h (68 mph) and swells of 5 to 7 m (16 to 23 ft) hitting the coastline of the island. On 18 January, it was reported that another motorcyclist was swept away by floodwaters, but unofficial reports claimed of several other deaths. Local economists estimated the damage of Belal amounted to Rs5.8 billion (US$131 million), including Rs1.8 billion (US$40.7 million) in agricultural sector. After the storm, the Ministry of Finance and Economic Development allocated Rs1 billion (US$22.6 million) for victims of the flooding and to repair the damage caused by Belal.

On 16 January, the Mauritian government announced that the director of the meteorological services, Ram Dhurmea had stepped down, because the institute hadn't given enough warnings to the citizens and underestimated the impact of Belal. On the next day, Dhurmea rejected the claim by the government, said that he never submitted any resignation nor officially stepped down as the director of MMS, and he was forced to step down. Later, the government confirmed the dismission of Dhurmea, effective on 17 January. The government also noted that the dismission was temporary until the internal investigation came to an end.

== See also ==
- Tropical cyclones in 2024
- Tropical cyclones in the Mascarene Islands
- Cyclone Gamede
- Cyclone Hondo
- Cyclone Bejisa
- Cyclone Berguitta
- Cyclone Garance
