= Cyclone Alvaro =

South-West Indian Ocean tropical storm in 2023

Tropical Cyclone Alvaro
- Alvaro near peak intensity over western Madagascar on 1 January

Meteorological history
- Formed: 30 December 2023
- Post-tropical: 3 January 2024
- Dissipated: 6 January 2024

Tropical cyclone
- 10-minute sustained (MFR)
- Highest winds: 120 km/h (75 mph)
- Lowest pressure: 982 hPa (mbar); 29.00 inHg

Category 1-equivalent tropical cyclone
- 1-minute sustained (SSHWS/JTWC)
- Highest winds: 120 km/h (75 mph)
- Lowest pressure: 986 hPa (mbar); 29.12 inHg

Overall effects
- Fatalities: 19
- Damage: >$1 million (2024 USD)
- Areas affected: Madagascar, Mozambique
- Part of the 2023–24 South-West Indian Ocean cyclone season

Tropical Cyclone Alvaro was a tropical cyclone that traversed over Madagascar during New Year's Day in 2024. The first named storm of the 2023-24 South-West Indian Ocean cyclone season, Alvaro originated as a tropical disturbance at the Mozambique Channel. Being forecasted to develop into a moderate tropical storm, the disturbance was in a favorable environment for intensification. Tracking southeast, the system was upgraded into a tropical depression on December 31. It later intensified into a tropical storm, receiving the name Alvaro. Alvaro continued to move and intensify despite vertical wind shear. On January 1, Alvaro further intensified into a tropical cyclone before making landfall over Morombe District, Madagascar. It weakened back to a tropical depression after passing over the mountainous terrain of the island nation. Alvaro re-entered again to the Indian Ocean and intensified back into a moderate tropical storm. Shortly after reintensification, strong wind shear prevented any further development of the storm. Alvaro later transitioned into a post-tropical depression, being last noted on January 4. Total damages are estimated to be greater than US$1 million.

== Meteorological history ==
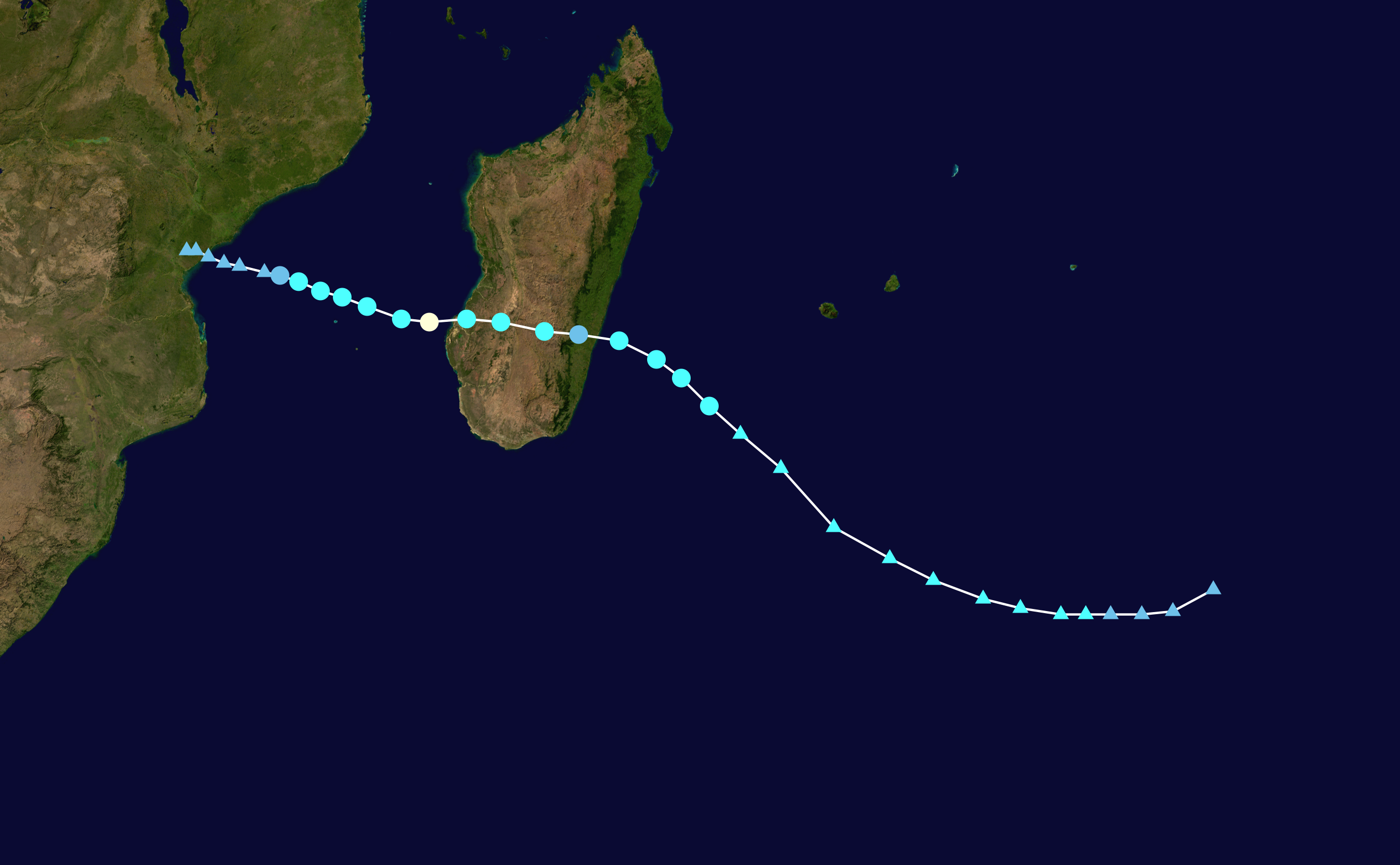
Map plotting the storm's track and intensity, according to the Saffir–Simpson scale Map key Saffir–Simpson scale Tropical depression (≤38 mph, ≤62 km/h) Tropical storm (39–73 mph, 63–118 km/h) Category 1 (74–95 mph, 119–153 km/h) Category 2 (96–110 mph, 154–177 km/h) Category 3 (111–129 mph, 178–208 km/h) Category 4 (130–156 mph, 209–251 km/h) Category 5 (≥157 mph, ≥252 km/h) Unknown Storm type Tropical cyclone Subtropical cyclone Extratropical cyclone, remnant low, tropical disturbance, or monsoon depression

In December 2023, the MFR began to monitor the potential for tropical cyclogenesis as Kelvin waves and Rossby waves intersect in the western portion of the agency's area of responsibility, ahead of a wet phase of the Madden–Julian oscillation; a low was forecast to develop into a moderate tropical storm south of the Mozambique Channel in these conditions. By 29 December, a monsoon trough had produced convection southeast of Beira, Mozambique that spun, as convergence of winds increases within the system's closed surface circulation. The next day, the MFR classified the system as a tropical disturbance, and in addition, the JTWC began monitoring the disturbance. Tracking southeast under the influence of a ridge, the disturbance was further upgraded to a tropical depression by the MFR on December 31. The warm core further consolidated, causing the system to intensify into a moderate tropical storm and receive the name Alvaro. Moreover, the JTWC designated the storm as Tropical Cyclone 04S.

During 1 January 2024, Alvaro's maintenance of a curved band and the emergence of an eye prompted the MFR to upgrade the system to a severe tropical storm, but after the season ended, Alvaro got upgraded to a tropical cyclone. As Alvaro continued to strengthen under favorable conditions despite vertical wind shear in the mid-level troposphere. The storm grew a central dense overcast around its ragged, inchoate eye while 269 km (167 mi) east-northeast of Europa Island, continuing east-southeast. Around 12:00 UTC, the JTWC stated that Alvaro had peaked with sustained winds of 110 km/h (70 mph), with the MFR stating that it had peaked with 10-minute sustained winds of 110 km/h (70 mph). Additionally, the MFR also measured the system's lowest barometric pressure at 985 hPa (29.09 inHg). However, in post-season analysis, MFR revealed that Alvaro actually peaked with 10-minute sustained winds of 120 km/h (75 mph) and a barometric pressure of 982 hPa (29.00 inHg), and Alvaro was upgraded to tropical cyclone status. As the storm approached Madagascar, the cloud top pattern slowly degraded as it warmed up, with the eye gradually disappearing due to persistent wind shear. At 19:20 EAT (16:20 UTC) that day, Alvaro made landfall in Morombe District, Madagascar as a severe tropical storm, with sustained winds of 100 km/h (60 mph). Alvaro rapidly weakened due to the mountainous terrain of the island nation, with rainbands around the core no longer present. By 12:00 UTC of 2 January, Alvaro weakened into an overland depression and exhibited the circulation to satellite imagery, only retaining convection over the east quadrant. Alvaro re-entered the Indian Ocean on 3 January, re-intensifying back into a moderate tropical storm. Shortly after however, Alvaro would succumb to strong wind shear as mid-level dry air invaded the storm, despite substantial outflow boosted by a subtropical jet. By 18:00 UTC, the MFR classified Alvaro as a post-tropical depression after the storm had lost its tropical characteristics. The MFR issued its final bulletin on Alvaro on 4 January, as the system interacted with the baroclinic zone. Steadily weakening, the remnants of Alvaro dissipated on 6 January.

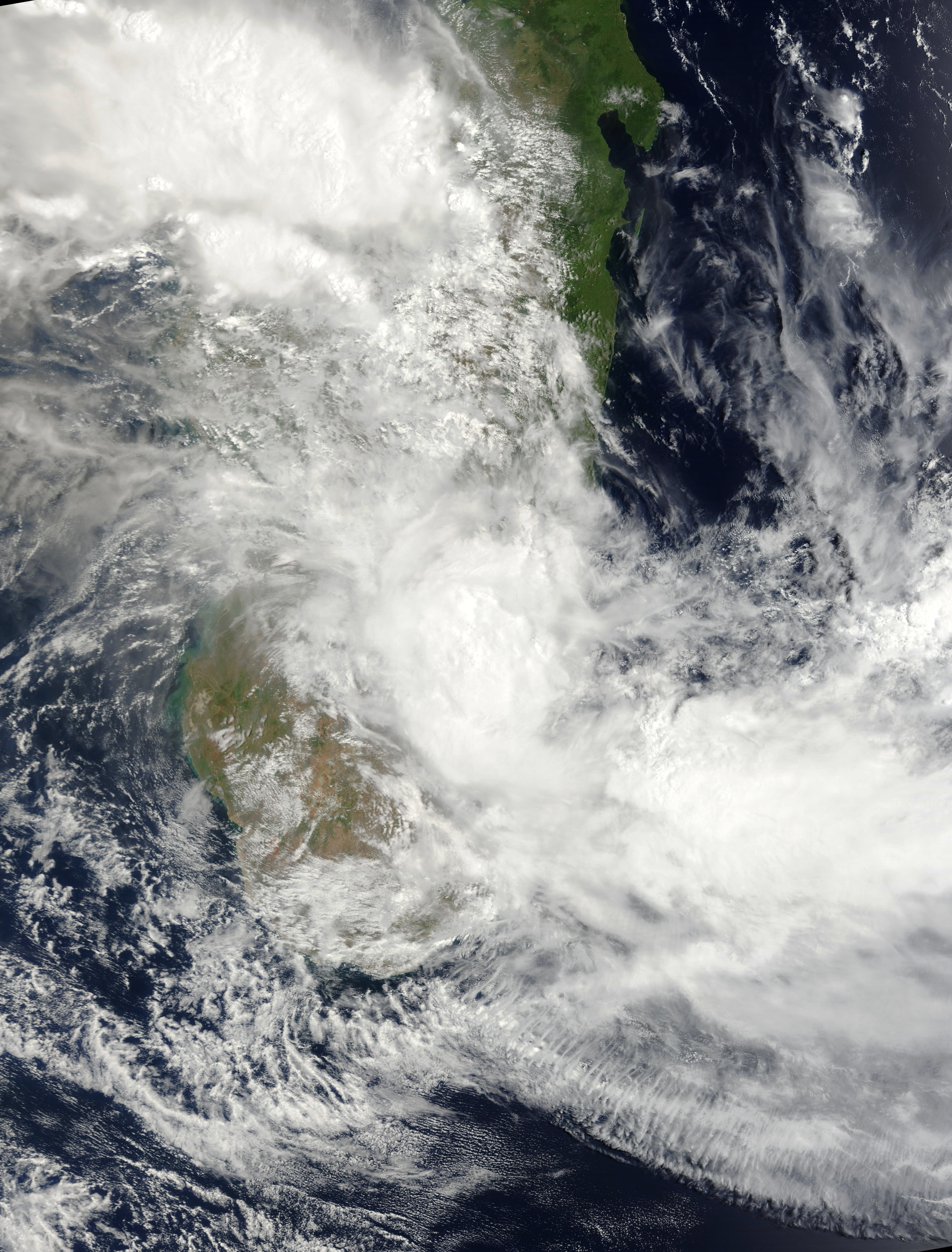
Tropical Depression Alvaro over eastern Madagascar on 2 January 2024

== Preparations and impact ==
Anticipating Alvaro's landfall, the meteorological service of Madagascar (Meteo Madagascar) raised a yellow alert for the districts of Morondava, Manja, Morombe, and Toliara on 31 December, which would be upgraded to a red alert a day later as Alvaro made landfall. Mariners across Maintirano and Toliara were advised to stay out of sea. The mayor of Morombe reported property damage. Several parts of the city were flooded, and many residents evacuated from their homes, using schools and outlying villages as accommodation sites. Areas of southern Madagascar reported uprooted trees, torn roofs, and damaged infrastructure, necessitating international assistance. Nearly 33,000 people in Madagascar were affected by Alvaro, with over 17,000 displaced. The regions of Haute Matsiatra, Atsimo-Andrefana, and Menabe suffered the brunt of the storm.

The displaced people were relocated to 36 evacuation centers. About 241 settlements were totally destroyed, and 426 homes were damaged in addition to 15 schools. Nineteen people were killed by the storm. In response to the disaster, the World Food Programme (WFP) allocated rice, oil, mosquito nets, and other equipment to the affected areas, in cooperation with the United States Agency for International Development (USAID).

== See also ==
- Tropical cyclones in 2024
- Weather of 2024
