= 2023–24 South-West Indian Ocean cyclone season =

Tropical cyclone season

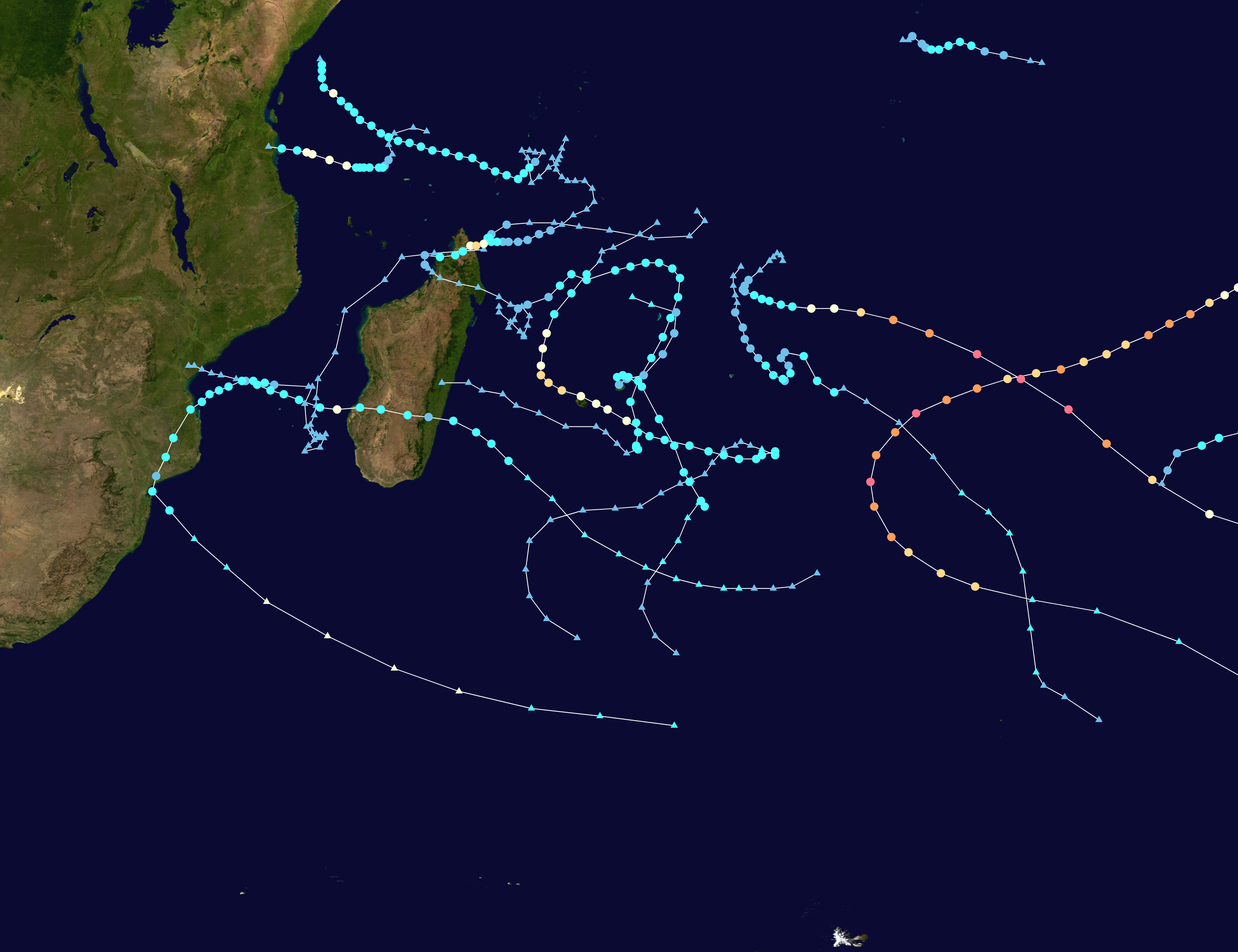
- Season summary map

Seasonal boundaries
- First system formed: 30 December 2023
- Last system dissipated: 22 May 2024

Strongest storm
- Name: Djoungou
  - Maximum winds: 215 km/h (130 mph) (10-minute sustained)
  - Lowest pressure: 920 hPa (mbar)

Seasonal statistics
- Total disturbances: 11 (1 unofficial)
- Total depressions: 11 (1 unofficial)
- Total storms: 10 (1 unofficial)
- Tropical cyclones: 7
- Intense tropical cyclones: 2
- Total fatalities: 53 total
- Total damage: $536 million (2024 USD)

Related articles
- 2023–24 Australian region cyclone season; 2023–24 South Pacific cyclone season

The 2023–24 South-West Indian Ocean cyclone season was an above-average season, including ten named storms (including an unnamed tropical storm), six tropical cyclones and two intense tropical cyclones. Despite its moderate activity, it was the least deadly season in four years, causing only 53 deaths, most of which were caused by cyclones Alvaro and Gamane. It began on 15 November 2023, and ended on 30 April 2024, with the exception for Mauritius and the Seychelles, where it ended on 15 May 2024. These dates conventionally delimit the period of each year when most tropical and subtropical cyclones form in the basin, which is west of 90°E and south of the Equator. However, tropical cyclones can form year-round, and all tropical cyclones that formed between 1 July 2023 and 30 June 2024 would be part of the season. Tropical and subtropical cyclones in this basin are monitored by the Regional Specialised Meteorological Centre in Réunion and unofficially by the Joint Typhoon Warning Center.

== Seasonal forecasts ==
| Records | | Moderate Tropical Storms | Very/Intense Tropical Cyclones |
|---|---|---|---|
| Record high: | | 15 | 9 |
| Record low: | | 3 | 0 |
| Forecast Center | Systems | | |
| Mauritius Meteorological Services | 6–8 tropical cyclones | | |
| Météo-France | 5–8 tropical cyclones | | |
| Forecast Center | Chance of above average | | |
| Météo-France | 10% | 20% | 70% |
Source: Seasonal Outlook for Tropical Cyclones.

In October 2023, Météo-France issued its seasonal forecast of cyclone activity for the basin, predicting a below-average season with 5–8 moderate tropical storms due to an expected strong El Niño event. The MFR also stated that the chance for a below-average season was 70%. Average cyclone activity was given a 20% chance, while an above-average level of activity was given a 10% chance.

The Mauritius Meteorological Services (MMS) also released their summer outlooks for the season, stating that around six to eight cyclones were expected to form, with the region west of Diego Garcia having environmental conditions more conducive for cyclogenesis.

== Seasonal summary ==
The ACE index for the 2023–24 South-West Indian Ocean cyclone season as calculated by Colorado State University was 106.7 units. Through 2024, five tropical cyclones, four of which became tropical storms, formed outside the cyclone season in the southwest Indian Ocean, tying 2003 with four named storms.

=== Season starts ===
The season officially started on 15 November 2023, however the first system, Alvaro, would not form until 30 December. Alvaro became a tropical depression the next day, traversing the Mozambique Channel, before making landfall in Morombe District, Madagascar on 1 January 2024. After a brief lull in activity, Tropical Cyclone Belal formed on 11 January. Belal would affect Mauritius and Reunion, killing six people. On 22 January, Moderate Tropical Storm Candice formed. On 25 January, Intense Tropical Cyclone Anggrek entered the basin, while Tropical Depression 05 emerging northeast of St. Brandon. After a lull period of about 3 weeks, the strongest storm being Intense Tropical Cyclone Djoungou from 13 February and exited the basin 6 days later. 17 February was the day Severe Tropical Storm Eleanor brought intense rainfall and winds which left at least 2 people injured, 10,000 customers deprived of electricity, several electricity pylons damaged, and toppled trees blocking several roads. It is the northern regions which suffered the greatest damage. Severe Tropical Storm Filipo emerged on 2 March near Mozambique affecting 48,000 people and damaging 8,000 houses. Tropical Depression Neville crossed into the basin on 24 March but MFR discontinued warning issuance. Short-lived Tropical Cyclone Gamane emerged on 25 March north-northeast of Toamasina, Madagascar, causing a total of 19 deaths, 3 people missing and at least 90,000 affected.

=== Off-season ===
The season ended with 1 tropical cyclone each in April and May. At the very end of April, Tropical Cyclone Hidaya formed near Seychelles and was the third tropical cyclone or depression in recorded history to make landfall in Tanzania, the others being an unnamed cyclone in 1952 and Tropical Depression Atang in 2002. Then on 16 May Tropical Cyclone Ialy formed east-northeast of Comoros, killing 2 people; strong winds tore off the roof of a school, killing a girl and injuring four others, while another person died due to a fallen wall.

== Systems ==
=== Tropical Cyclone Alvaro ===
- Tropical cyclone (MFR)
- Category 1 tropical cyclone (SSHWS)
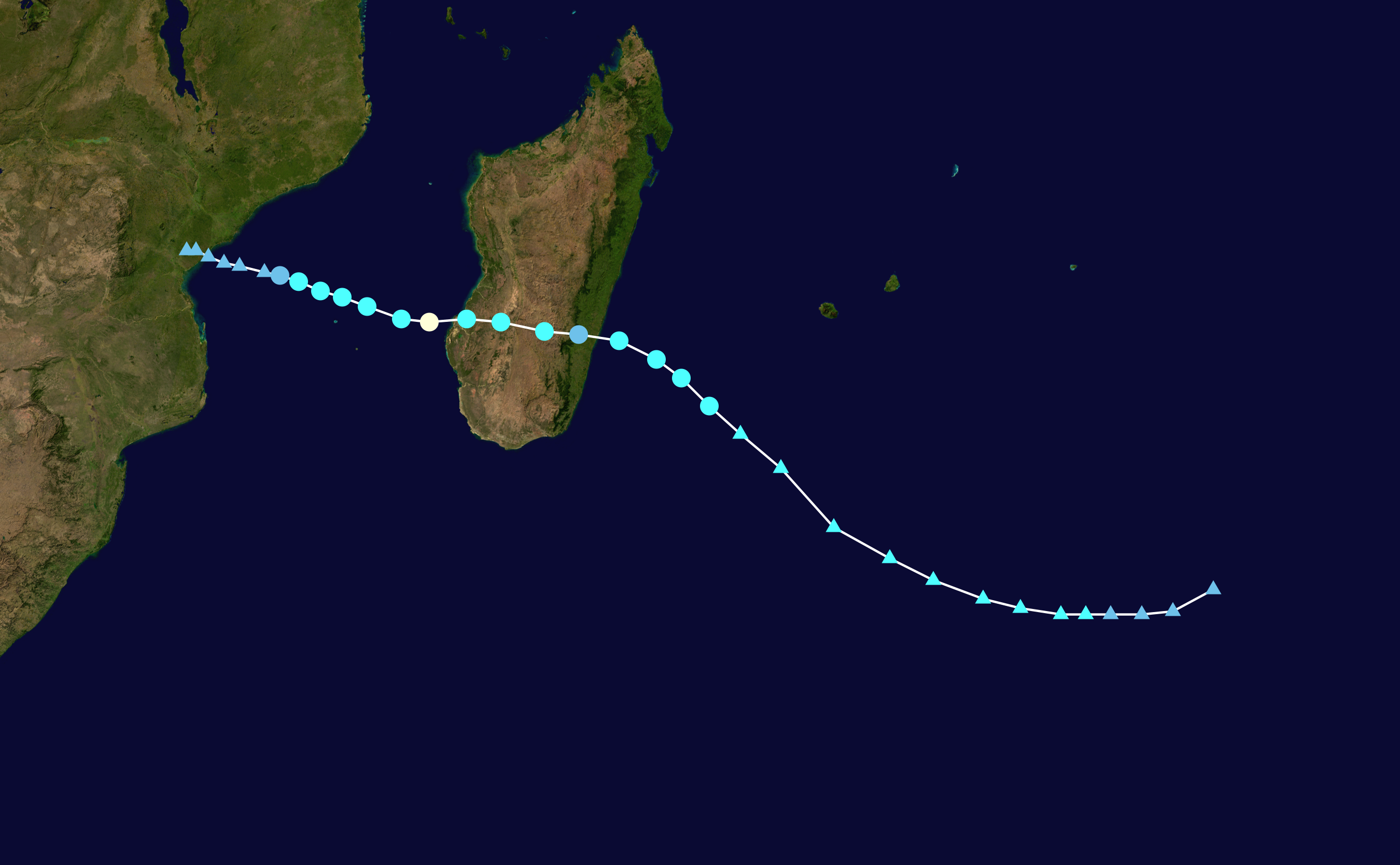
- Duration: 30 December – 3 January
- Peak intensity: 120 km/h (75 mph) (10-min); 982 hPa (mbar)

In December 2023, the MFR began to monitor the potential for tropical cyclogenesis as Kelvin waves and Rossby waves intersected in the western portion of the agency's area of responsibility, ahead of a wet phase of the Madden–Julian oscillation (MJO). By 29 December, a monsoon trough had produced convection southeast of Beira, Mozambique that spun, as convergence of winds increased within the system's closed surface circulation. The next day, the MFR classified the system as a tropical disturbance. Tracking southeast under the influence of a ridge, the disturbance was further upgraded to a tropical depression by the MFR on 31 December. The warm core consolidated, causing the system to intensify into a moderate tropical storm and receive the name Alvaro, with JTWC designated as Tropical Cyclone 04S.

During 1 January 2024, Alvaro's maintenance of a curved band and the emergence of an eye prompted the MFR to upgrade the system to a severe tropical storm, as Alvaro continued to strengthen under favorable conditions despite vertical wind shear in the mid-level troposphere. Alvaro later made landfall in Morombe District, Madagascar, bringing sustained winds of 140 km/h (85 mph) and gusts of 140 km/h (85 mph). Alvaro rapidly weakened due to the mountainous terrain of the island nation, with rainbands around the core no longer present. Alvaro re-entered the Indian Ocean on 3 January, re-intensifying back into a moderate tropical storm. By 18:00 UTC, the MFR classified Alvaro as a post-tropical depression after the storm had lost its tropical characteristics. The MFR issued its final bulletin on Alvaro on 4 January, as the system interacted with the baroclinic zone. Total damages are estimated to be greater than US$1 million.

=== Tropical Cyclone Belal ===
- Tropical cyclone (MFR)
- Category 2 tropical cyclone (SSHWS)
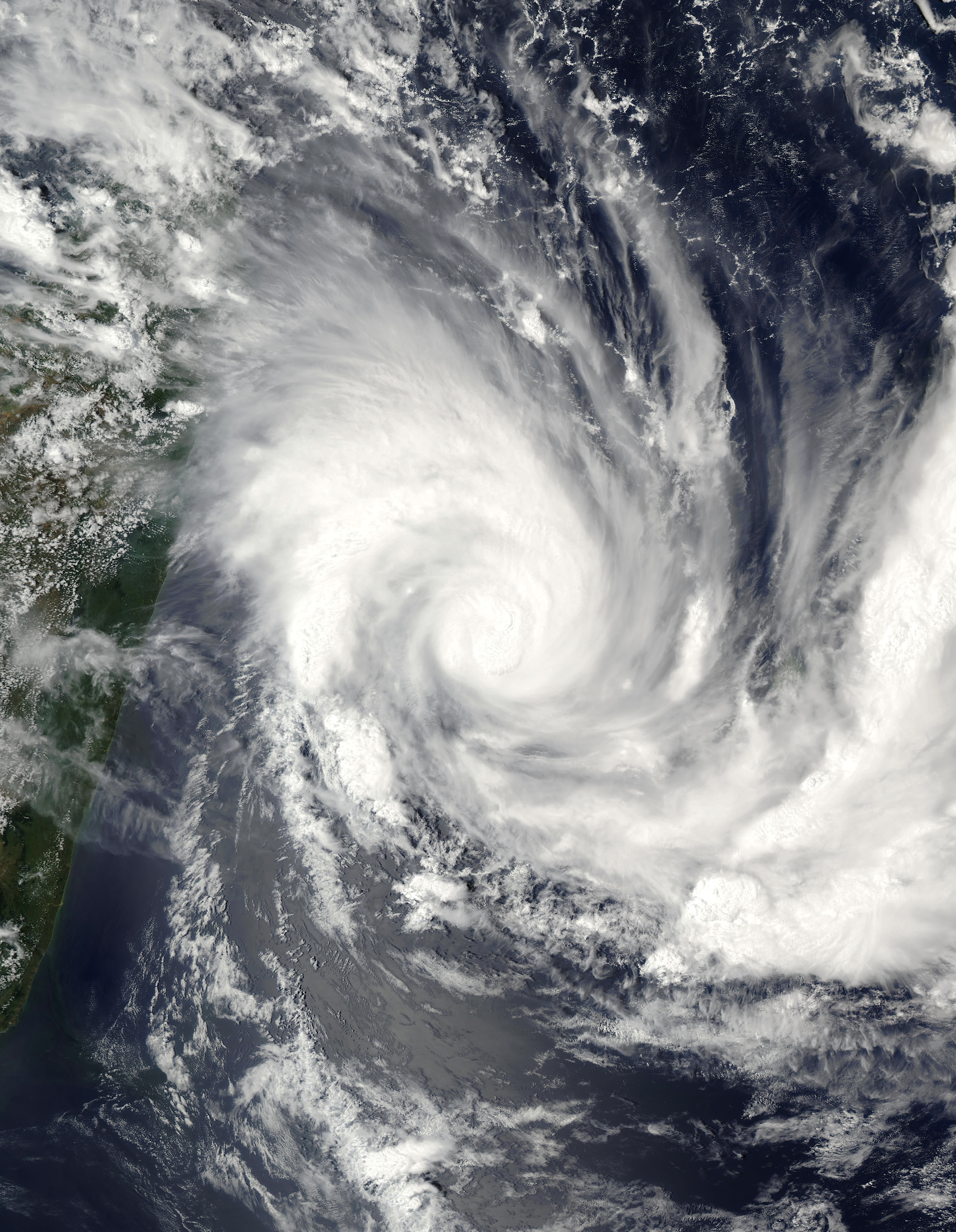
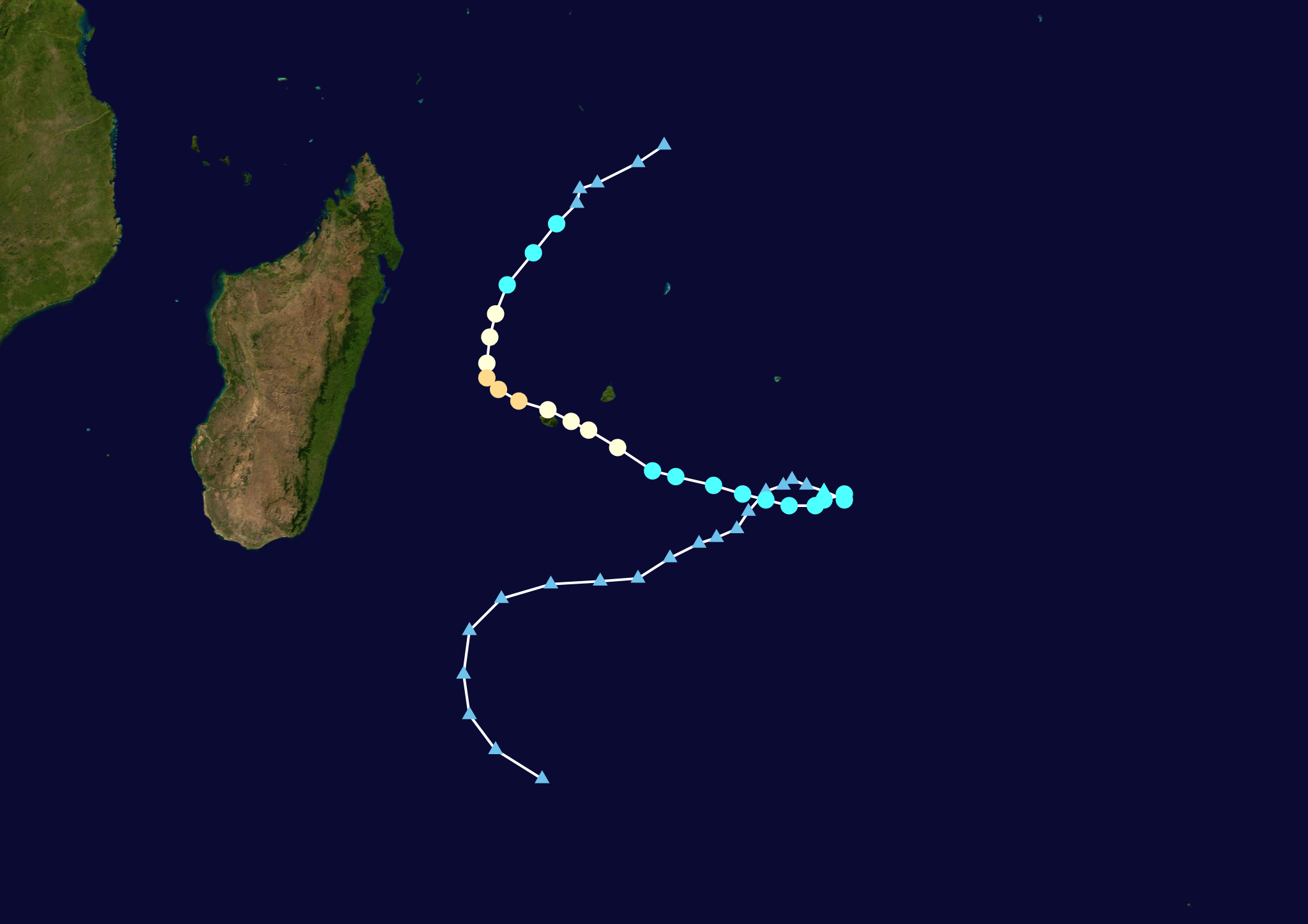
- Duration: 11 January – 18 January
- Peak intensity: 140 km/h (85 mph) (10-min); 968 hPa (mbar)

On 11 January, the MFR marked a zone of disturbed weather, citing the conducive conditions induced by the MJO and an equatorial Rossby wave. The monsoon trough north-northeast of Madagascar had intensified several days prior, as convergence transferred moisture aloft. Concentration of convection near the center increased, particularly in the western section, as the system moved south. By the next day, the JTWC issued a Tropical Cyclone Formation Alert (TCFA) on the potential disturbance, since it was in an environment of very warm sea surface temperatures, high ocean heat content, low vertical shear, and excellent outflow. At 12:00 UTC, the MFR categorized the system as a tropical depression. Additionally, microwave imagery indicated an eye in the lower-layer while the storm steered more westward, and the JTWC began issuing advisories on the system as a tropical cyclone. By 13 January, it intensified to a moderate tropical storm, prompting the MMS to name it Belal. Intense lightning activity within the center further signaled a period of rapid intensification, leading to Belal becoming a severe tropical storm. As the storm developed a well-defined eye, the MFR upgraded Belal to a tropical cyclone early on 14 January. However, while Belal recurved southeastward, wind shear began to deteriorate the storm's structure into becoming asymmetrical. The eyewall then struck the island of Réunion during the next day. The storm briefly weakened back into a severe tropical storm, before again becoming a tropical cyclone on 16 January after organization of the CDO. Weakening then continued from dry air intrusion, causing Belal to become a moderate tropical storm on the next day. By the end of 18 January, Belal had degenerated into a remnant low.

As the system developed, the MFR issued a yellow cyclone pre-alert for Réunion on 13 January, which was upgraded to an orange cyclone alert on 15:00 UTC the next day. On 13 January, the MMS raised a class I cyclone warning for Mauritius. On 14 January, the MFR upgraded the orange alert into a red alert for Réunion as Belal neared the island. The next day, the MFR hoisted a purple alert for Réunion as Belal neared the coast. The eyewall of Belal remained just offshore the northern coast of Réunion during the storm's closest passage. Four people died during the storm in Réunion. Around 150,000 electricity customers lost power, representing more than a third of the island's population. Around 37,000 people lost access to water. Two people died in Mauritius. After the storm's passage, Mauritius' head of meteorology stepped down after his institution was accused of "not giving adequate warning about the storm’s impact."

=== Severe Tropical Storm Candice ===
- Severe tropical storm (MFR)
- Tropical storm (SSHWS)
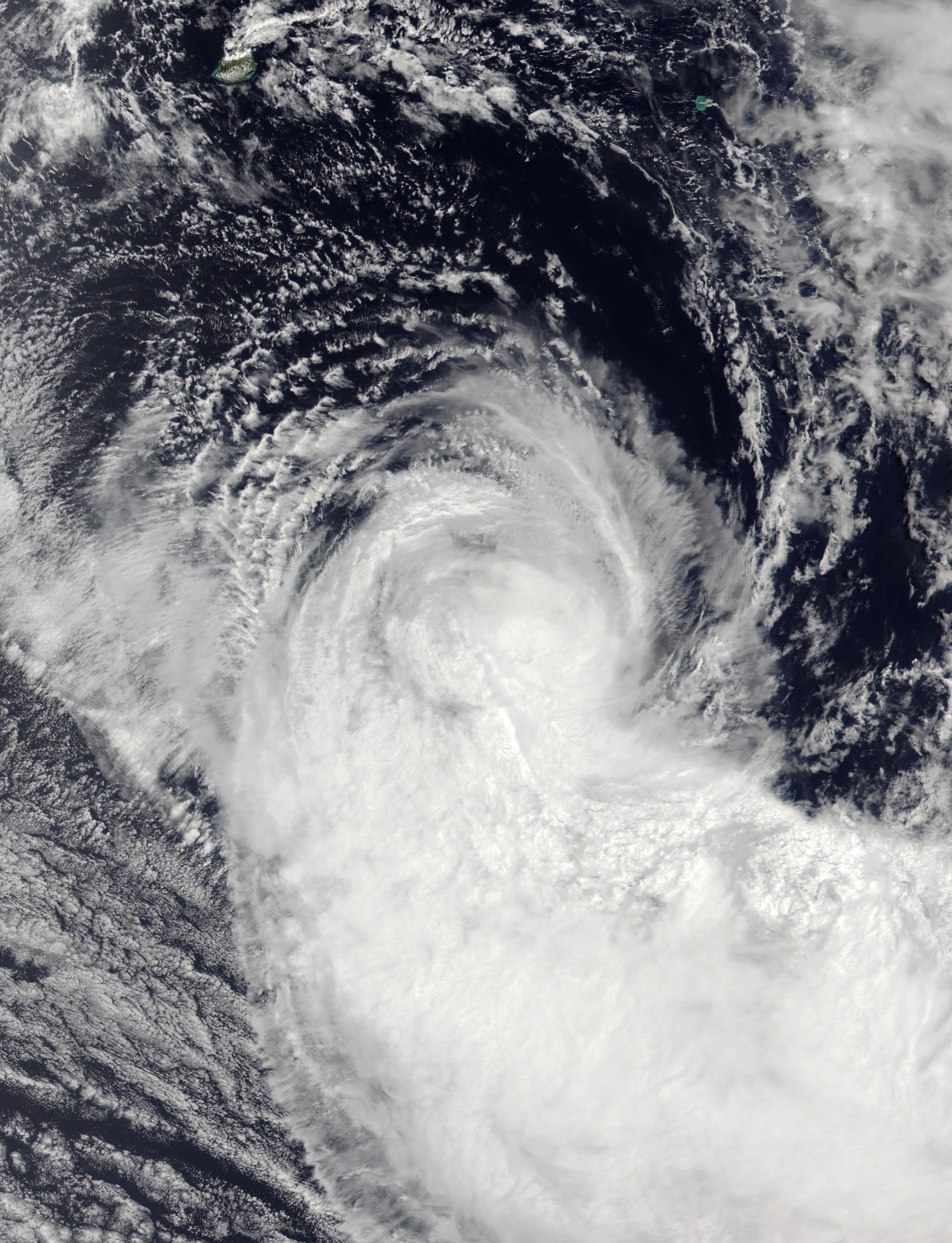
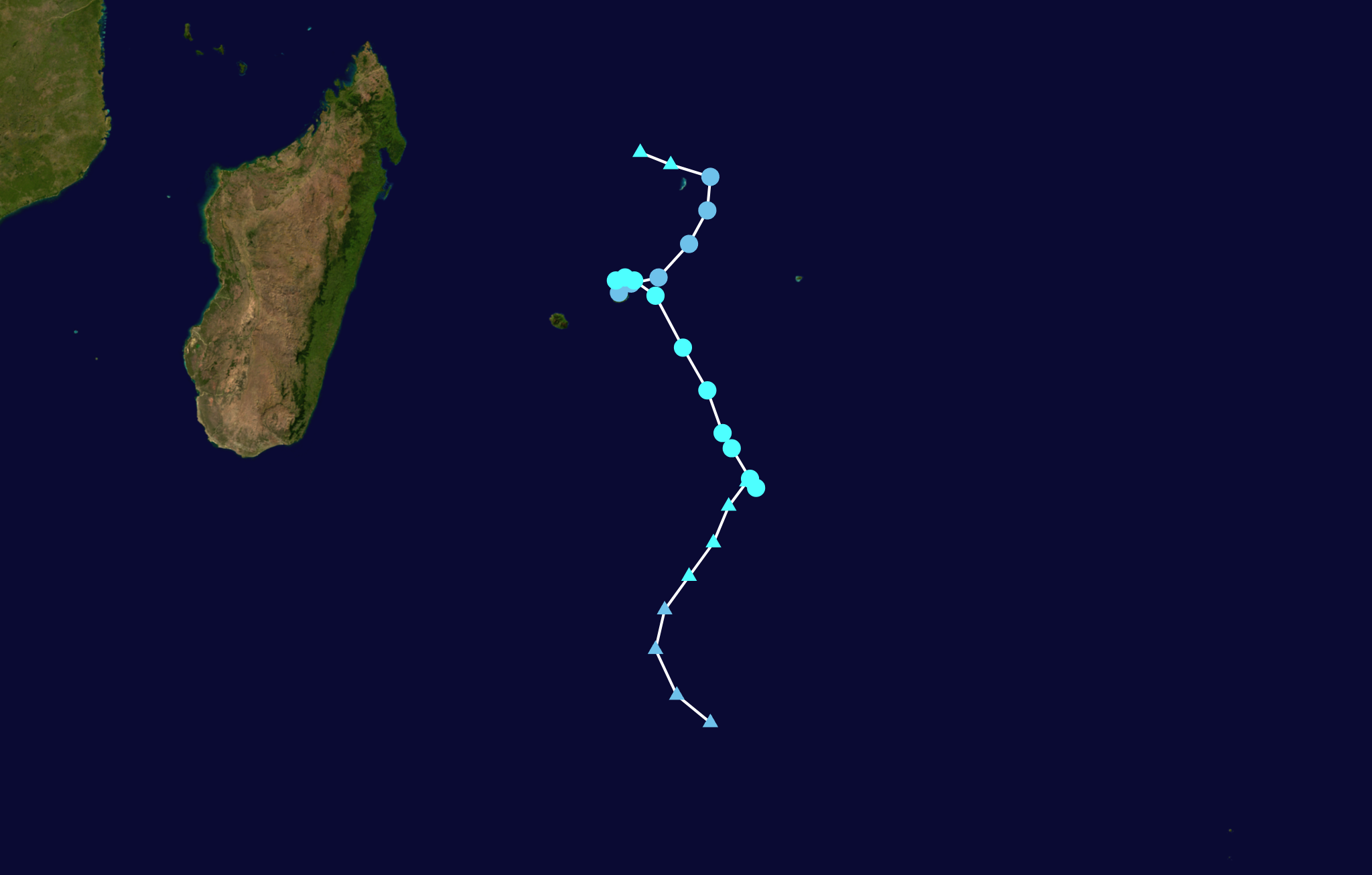
- Duration: 22 January – 27 January
- Peak intensity: 100 km/h (65 mph) (10-min); 980 hPa (mbar)

On 17 January, the MFR noted in its daily bulletin that a strong surge of monsoon flow northeast of the Mascarenes could produce a precursor vortex. By 22 January, the MFR began releasing warnings on a broad but ill-defined circulation. Convection was offsetted far from the center as the system turns from south to southwest under the influence of a low-level ridge. Upper-level divergence in conjunction with warm sea surface temperatures subdued the effects of vertical shear, enabling consolidation of the disturbance. On 23 January, the JTWC issued a TCFA for the system. The next day, the MFR reported that the system intensified into a tropical depression at 06:00 UTC on 24 January, before the MMS upgraded the system to a moderate tropical storm two hours later, naming it Candice. On 25 January, the JTWC followed suit in recognising the system as Tropical Cyclone 08S. Candice eventually encountered more hostile environmental conditions, as wind shear began to increase dramatically. Convective activity associated with Candice became limited to the cyclone, the MFR estimated that the system had peaked as a severe tropical storm with 10-minute sustained winds of 95 km/h (60 mph). Environmental conditions and increasingly strong wind shear displaced the storm's convection, weakening it further. Candice degenerated into a post-tropical depression on 27 January as deep convective had ceased, and the final advisory was then issued by MFR. The same day, the JTWC issued its final warning on the system as it became a weakly defined system with an exposed low-level circulation center (LLCC).

=== Intense Tropical Cyclone Anggrek ===
- Intense tropical cyclone (MFR)
- Category 4 tropical cyclone (SSHWS)
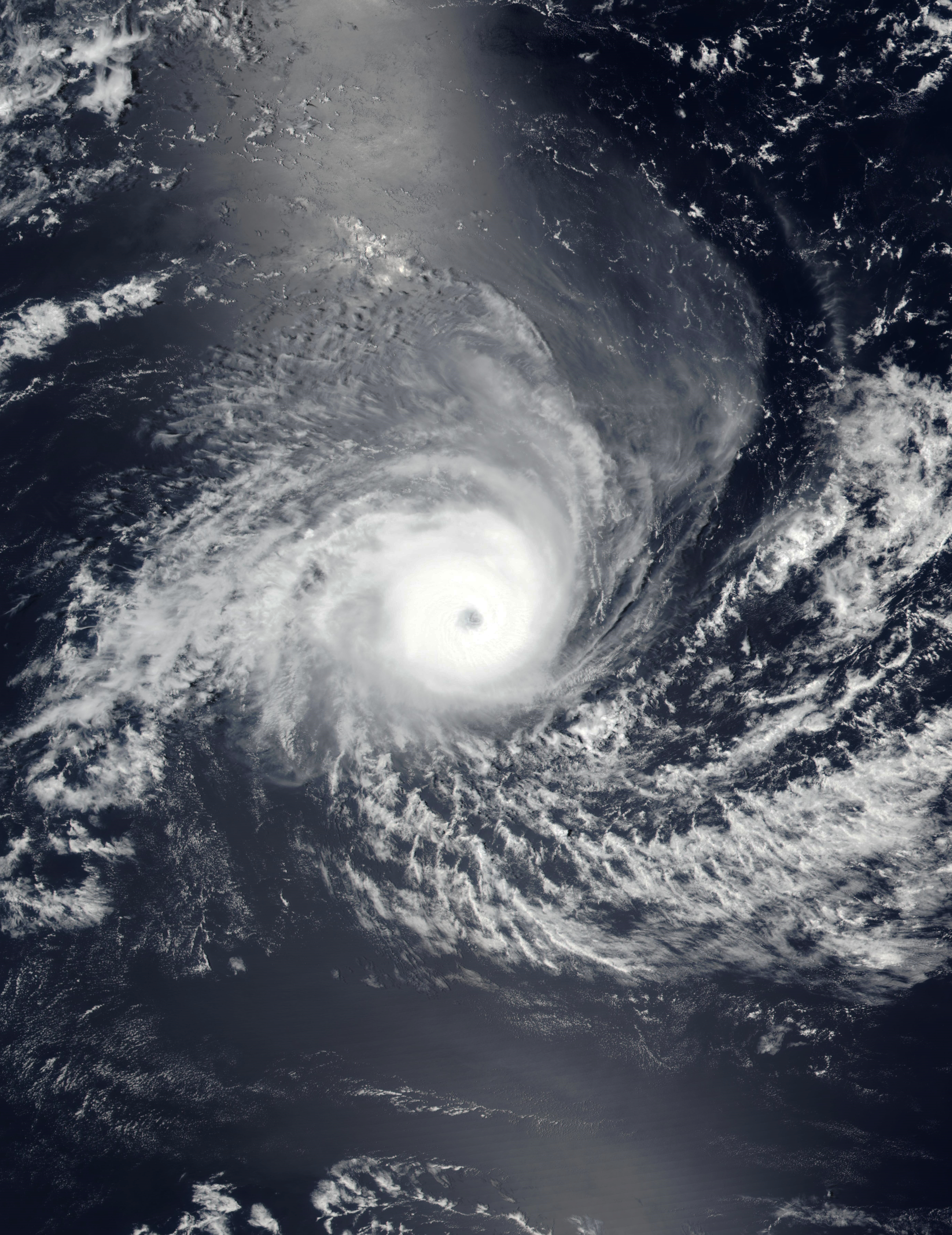
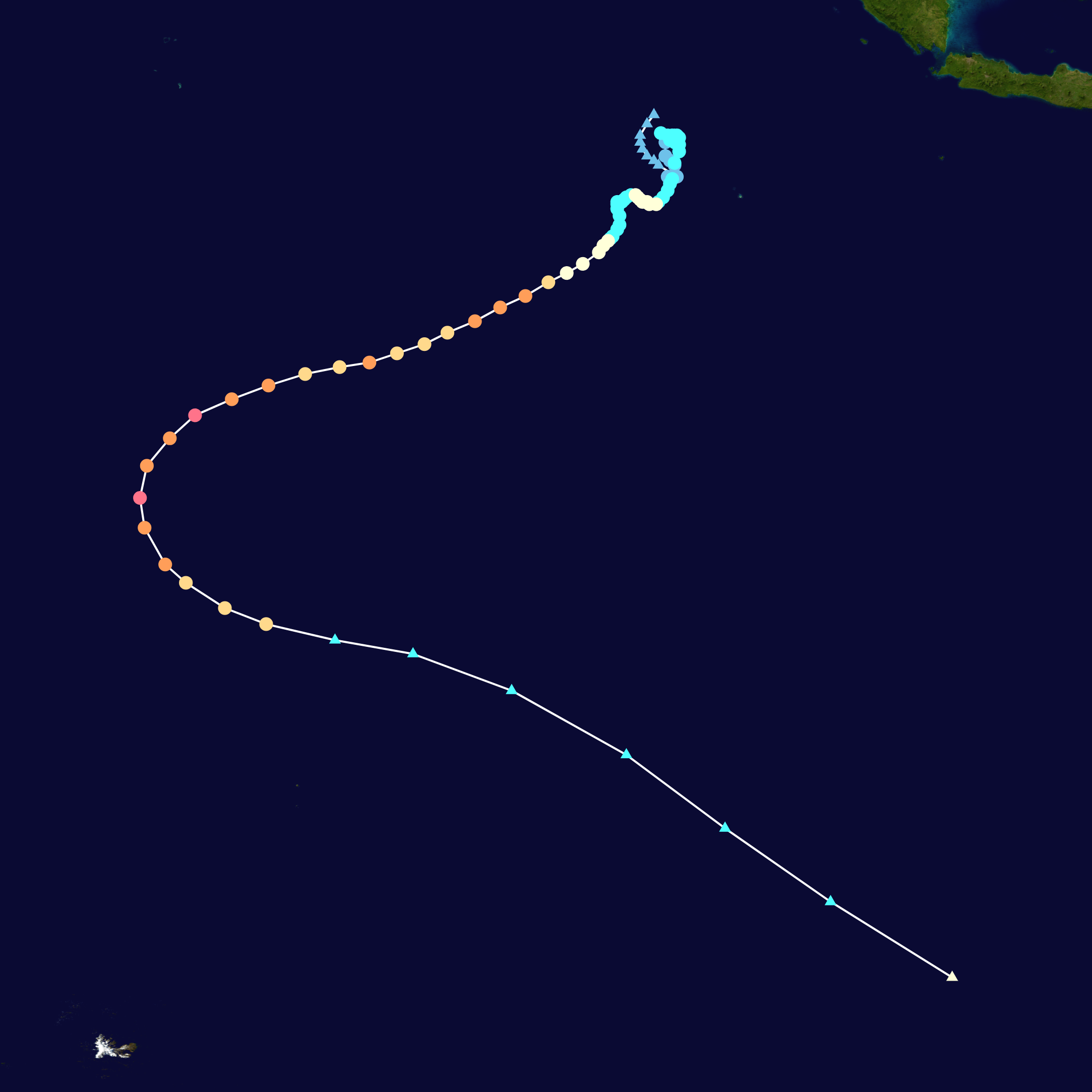
- Duration: 25 January (Entered basin) – 30 January
- Peak intensity: 195 km/h (120 mph) (10-min); 942 hPa (mbar)

On 25 January, Severe Tropical Cyclone Anggrek moved into the basin from the Australian region and was classified as a tropical cyclone. Anggrek strengthened into a Category 3 equivalent cyclone around 09:00 UTC on 26 January, after eye had emerged on satellite imagery, surrounded by a ring of −112 °F (−80 °C) cloud tops. Six hours later, the cyclone maintained a well-defined eye, and the MFR later upgraded the system to an intense tropical cyclone. The cyclone was highly compact, with a distinct eye. The cyclone weakened and bottomed out at 165 km/h (105 mph) on 28 January. Later the next day, the JTWC stated that Anggrek peaked with one-minute sustained winds of 220 km/h (140 mph)—equivalent to a Category 4 hurricane. Around the same time, the convection decreasingly organized and wrapped around the LLCC. The system was moving quickly southeastwards, steered by a ridge to its east. Shortly afterward, Anggrek's cloud pattern slightly deteriorated; it then weakened due to strong wind shear. Soon after, Anggrek's eye gradually disappeared from infrared and visible satellite imagery. The MFR issued its last advisory on the storm as the convective structure weakened further at 18:00 UTC on 30 January. Later the next day, the JTWC discontinued warnings.

=== Tropical Depression 05 ===
- Tropical depression (MFR)
- Tropical storm (SSHWS)
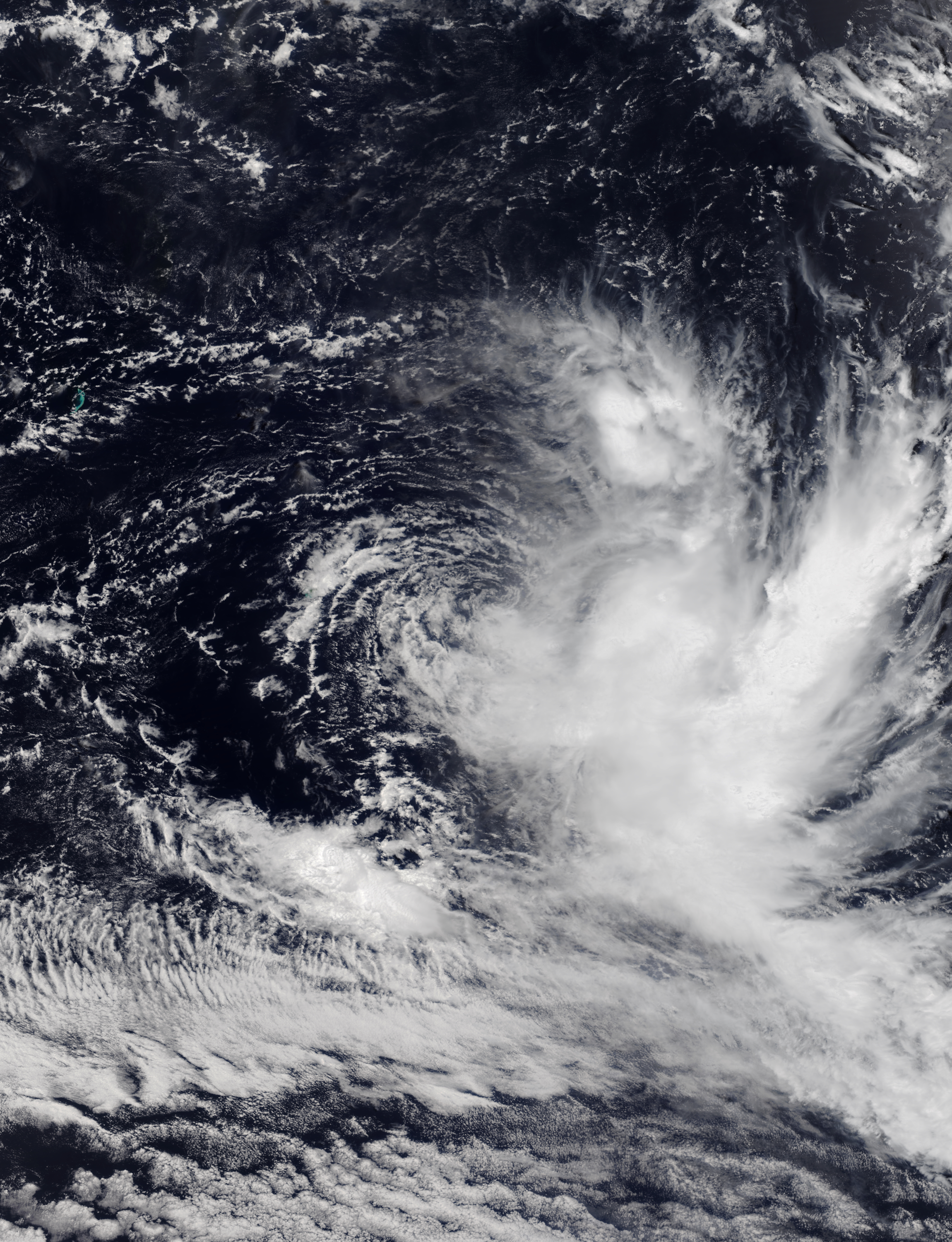
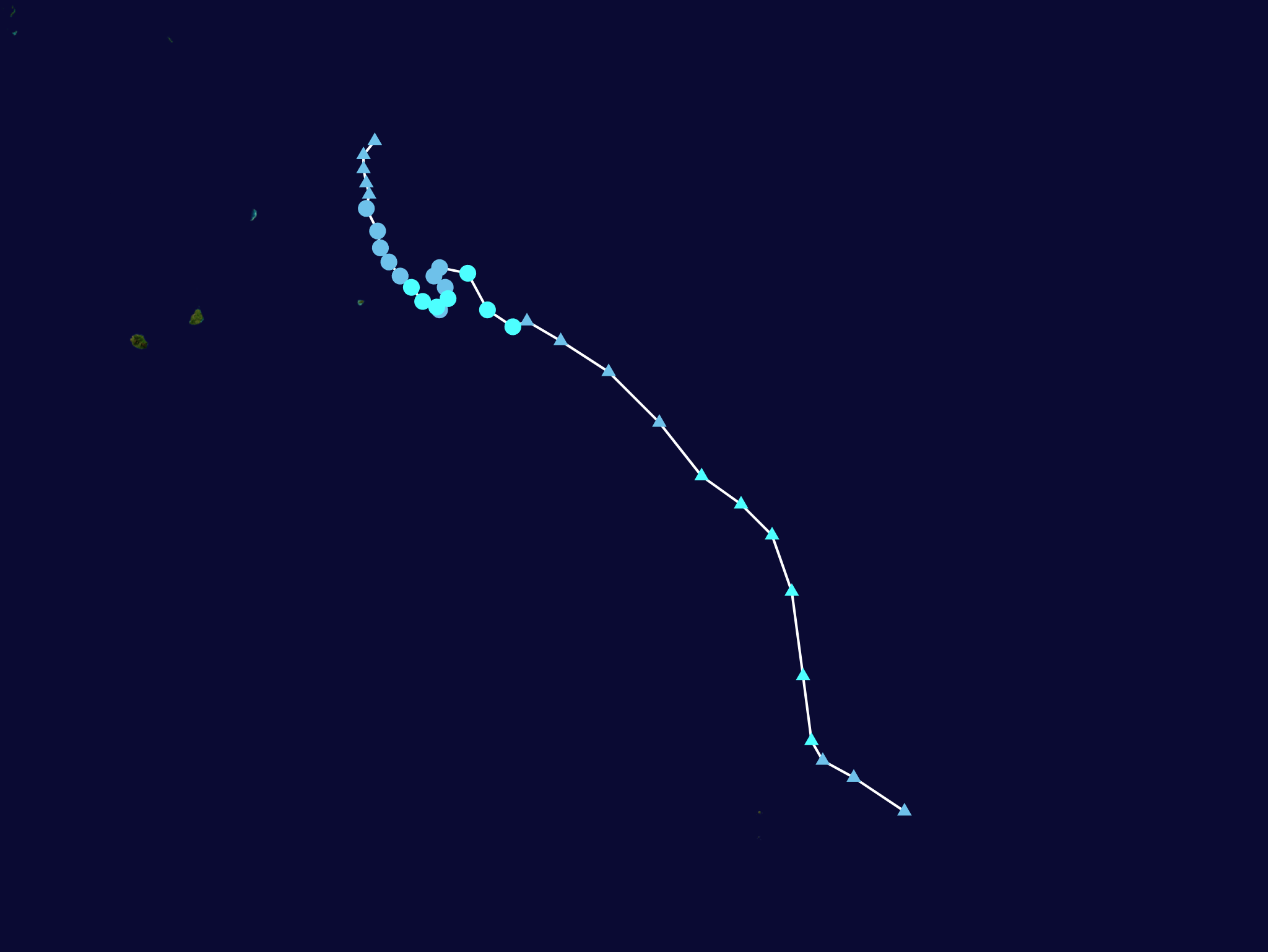
- Duration: 28 January – 2 February
- Peak intensity: 55 km/h (35 mph) (10-min); 999 hPa (mbar)

On 25 January, the MFR began highlighting the potential for tropical cyclone development in their daily bulletins, noting an increase in shower activity northeast of St. Brandon. The monsoon trough began to produce persistent convection over the southwestern Indian Ocean. The disturbance continued organizing, and at 00:00 UTC on 30 January, MFR upgraded the system to a tropical disturbance. The same day, the JTWC issued a TCFA for the system as its circulation consolidated, and the next day, it recognised the system as Tropical Cyclone 09S. Convective activity within the disturbance become better organized, resulting in it strengthening to a tropical depression. However, deep convection eventually dissipated, and the system degenerated into a remnant low at 06:00 UTC on 1 February; however, it resumed an increase in convective activity and organization, prompting the MFR to classify the storm as a tropical depression again by the next day. Six hours later, they released their final advisory due to the system being affected by low to moderate wind shear, with its deep convection displaced from the eastern semicircle. The JTWC subsequently issued their final advisory on the system, as its circulation became fully exposed.

=== Intense Tropical Cyclone Djoungou ===
- Intense tropical cyclone (MFR)
- Category 5 tropical cyclone (SSHWS)
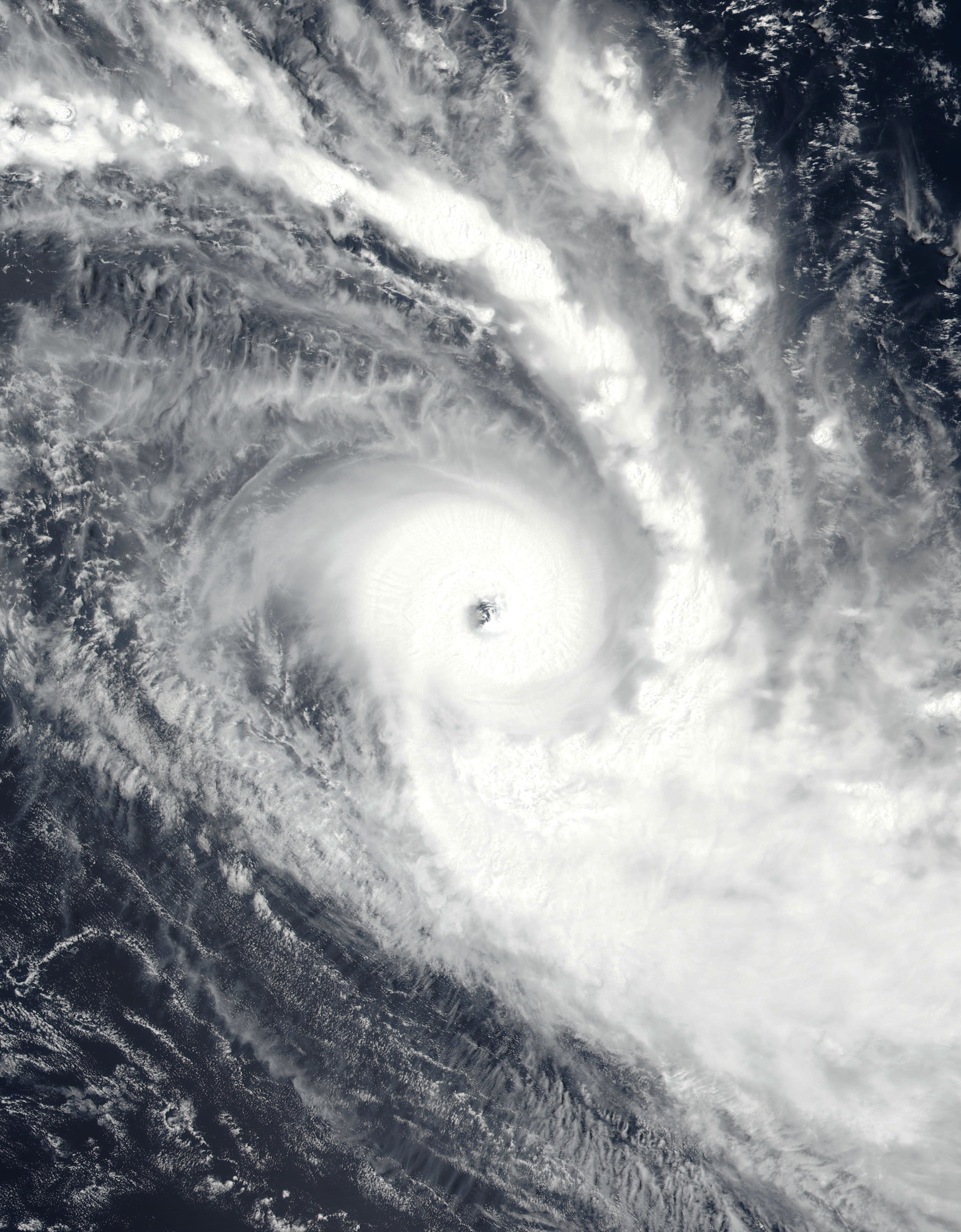
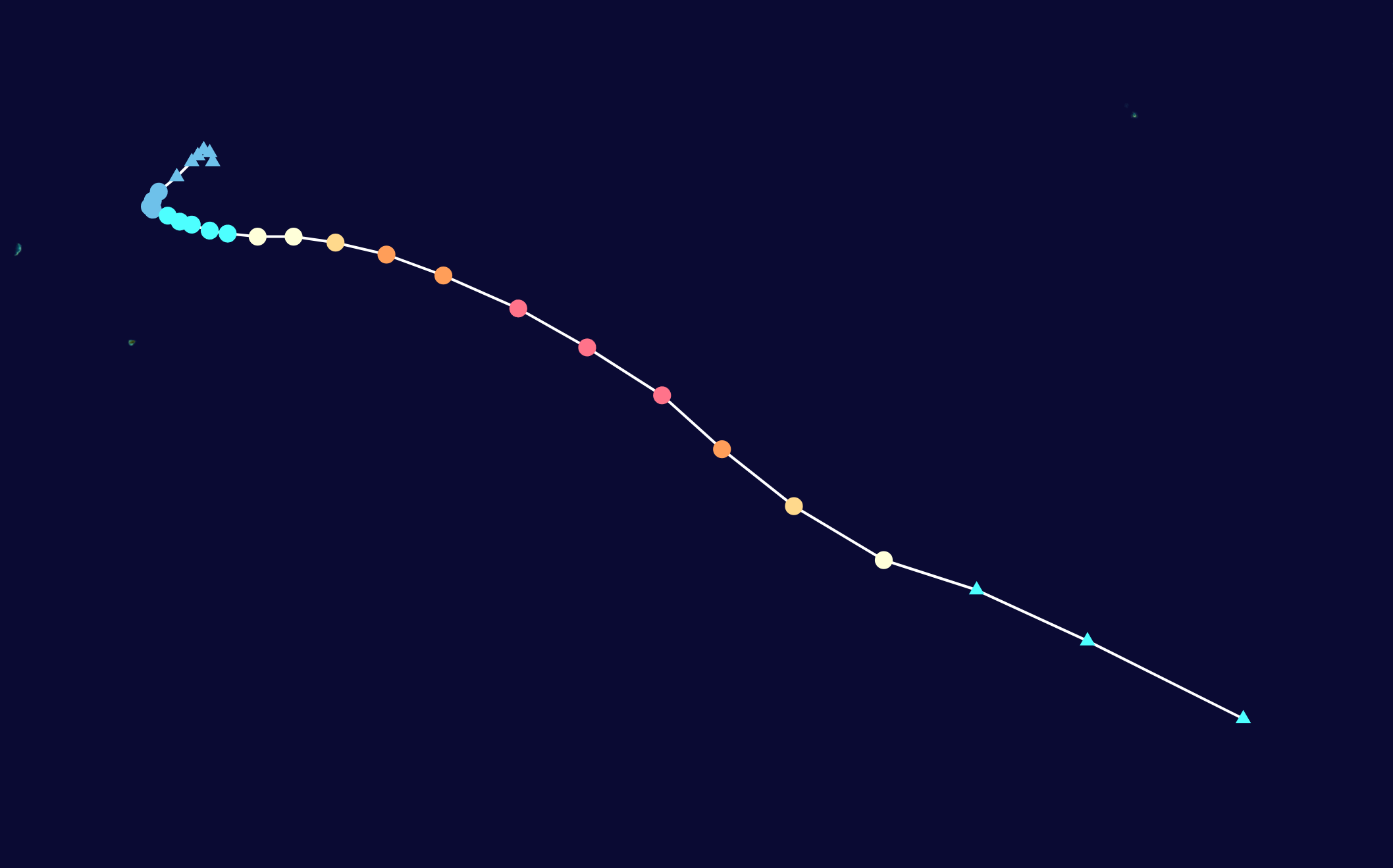
- Duration: 13 February – 19 February (Exited basin)
- Peak intensity: 215 km/h (130 mph) (10-min); 920 hPa (mbar)

On 8 February, MFR's tropical weather discussions began to highlight the possibility of a storm gradually developing in the northeast of the Mascarene Islands. It gradually organized over favorable environmental conditions with very warm sea surface temperatures and low wind shear. At 00:00 UTC on 15 February, the system was classified as a tropical disturbance. A day later, the system was upgraded to a tropical depression following a significant increase in curved banding. Later that day, the JTWC issued a TCFA, noting a deep convection persisting around the center of circulation. The JTWC upgraded the system to Tropical Cyclone 13S, with the MMS naming it Djoungou a few hours later as it rapidly organized with deep flaring convection around the system's LLLC. However, multispectral satellite imagery indicated that the cyclone had developed a banding eye feature. As the eye emerged on visible satellite imagery early on 16 February, and at 18:00 UTC that day, the MFR classified Djoungou as a severe tropical storm. However, a small central dense overcast (CDO) developed over Djoungou; it rapidly developed, becoming a Category 1 equivalent cyclone. Soon afterward, the storm structure evolved the eye pattern and was surrounded by intense convective bursts, becoming a tropical cyclone. Later, Djoungou was upgraded to a Category 4 equivalent major cyclone, with one-minute sustained winds estimated at 230 km/h (145 mph). MFR immediately classified Djoungou as an intense tropical cyclone after the eye gradually improved its convective pattern. However, due to wind shear, the cyclone's increasingly asymmetrical eye disappeared from satellite imagery. Djoungou soon entered into an environment of increasing wind shear, causing its structure to rapidly deteriorate. MFR issued its last advisory on Djoungou as it weakened into a post-tropical depression. On 19 February, Djoungou crossed into the Australian basin to the west-southwest of Learmonth, Western Australia.

=== Severe Tropical Storm Eleanor ===
- Severe tropical storm (MFR)
- Tropical storm (SSHWS)
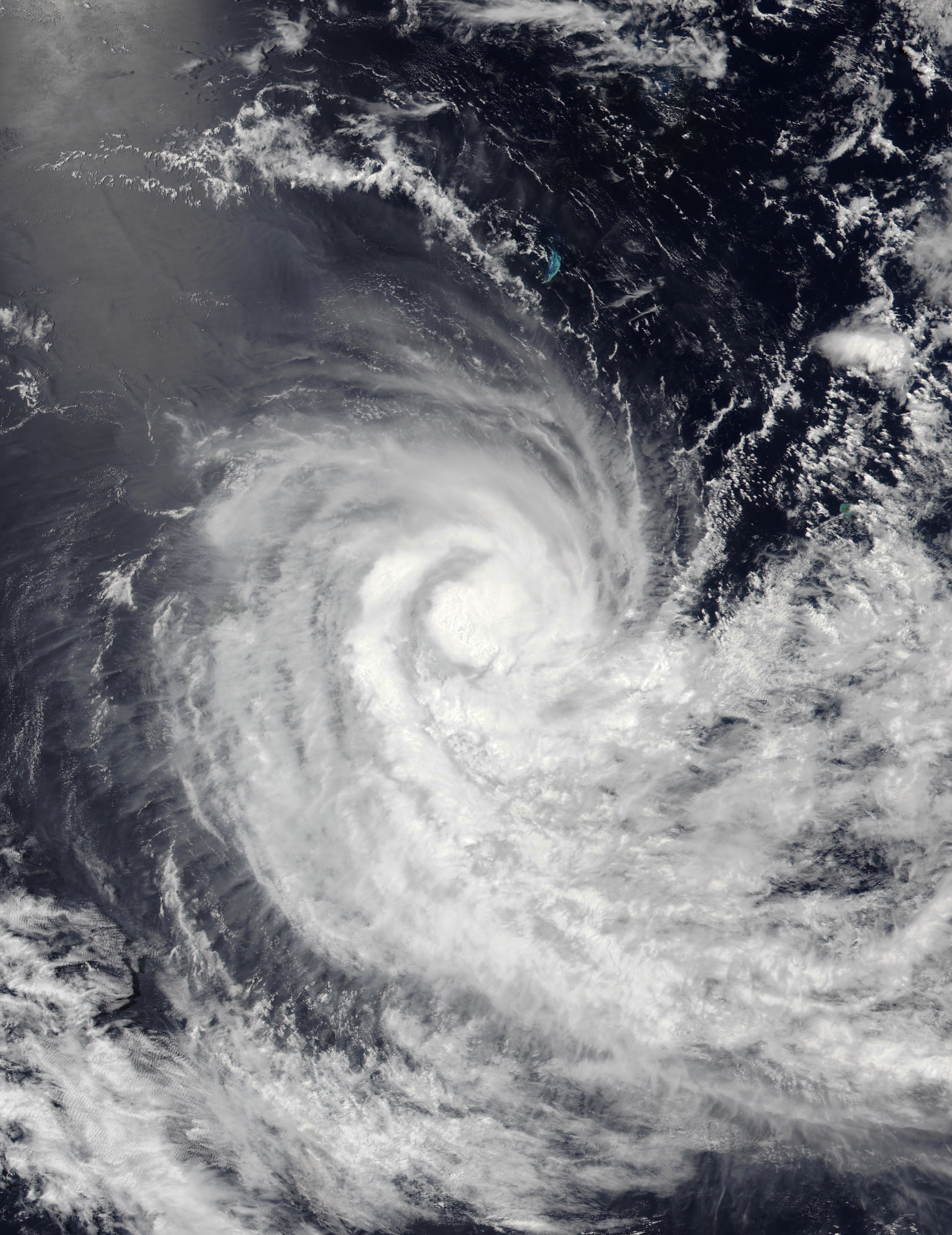
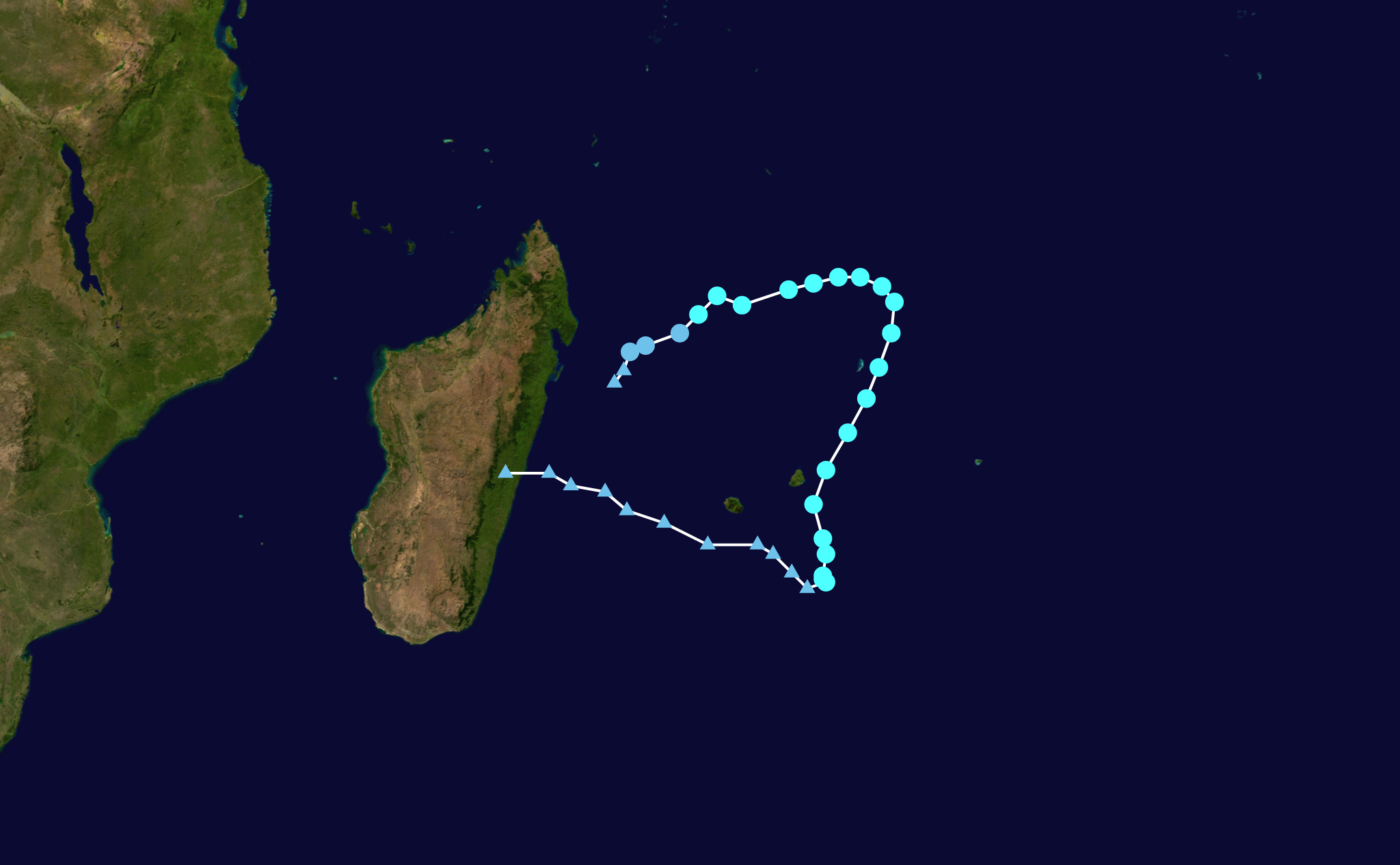
- Duration: 17 February – 24 February
- Peak intensity: 100 km/h (65 mph) (10-min); 987 hPa (mbar)

According to the first reports, the damage was light to moderate in Mauritius and La Reunion. In Mauritius, strong winds and heavy rain left at least 2 people injured, 10,000 customers deprived of electricity, several electricity pylons damaged, and trees toppled which blocked several roads. The northern regions suffered the greatest damage.

=== Severe Tropical Storm Filipo ===
- Severe tropical storm (MFR)
- Tropical storm (SSHWS)
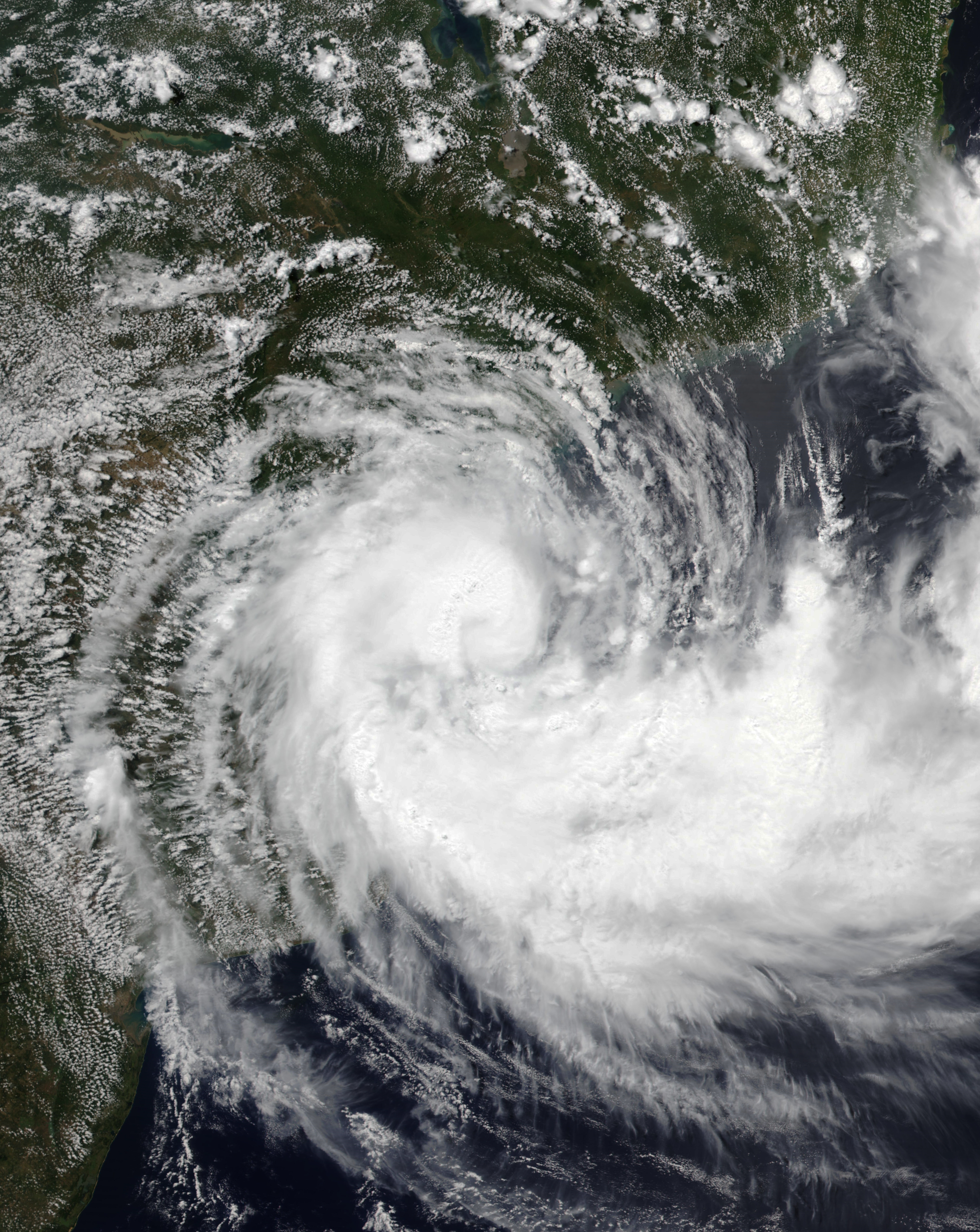
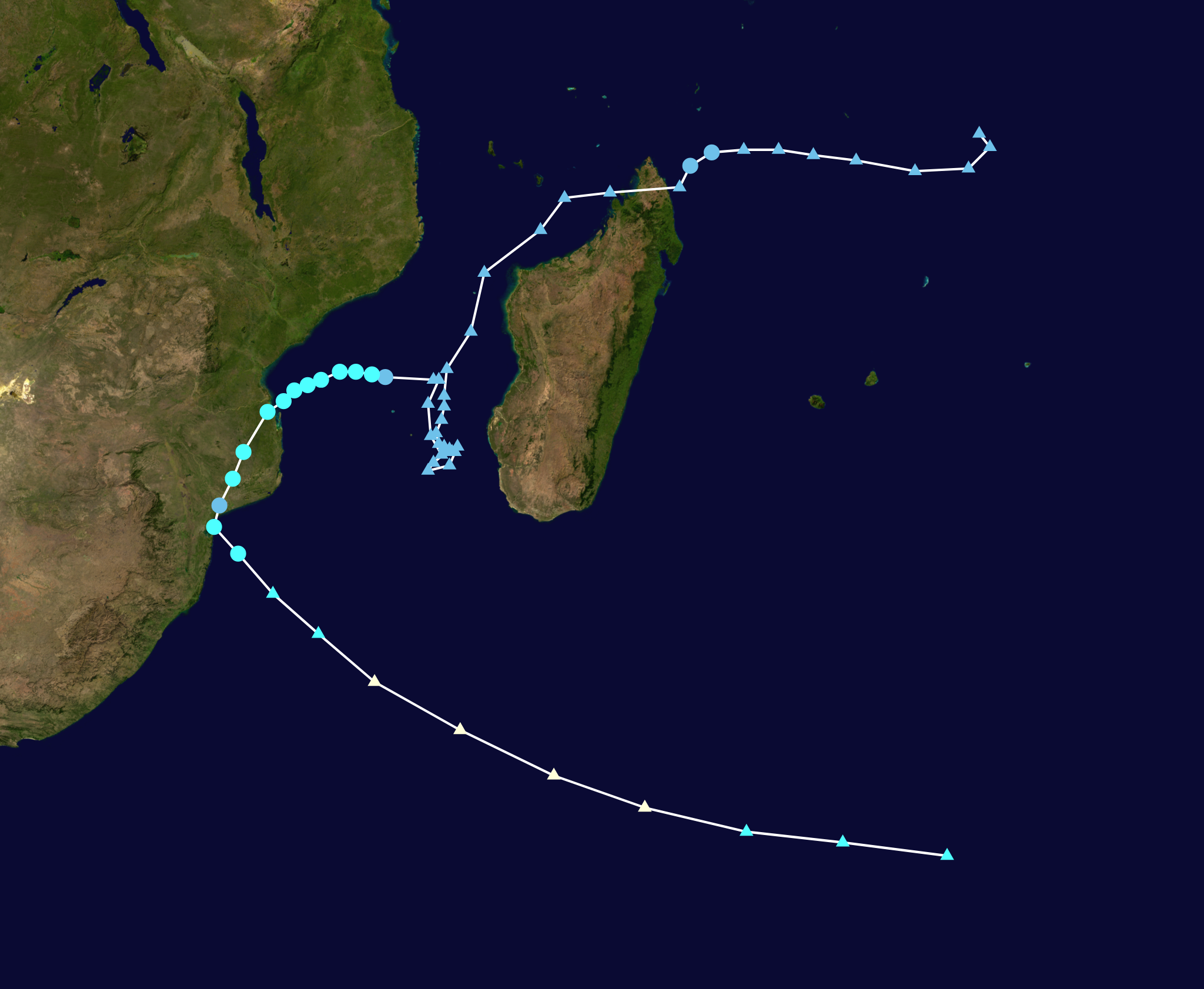
- Duration: 2 March – 14 March
- Peak intensity: 100 km/h (65 mph) (10-min); 989 hPa (mbar)

A report from the National Disasters Management Institute (INGD) on March 15 mentioned 48,000 people affected in the provinces of Gaza, Inhambane, Maputo and Sofala with 2 deaths and 25 injured. It is estimated that 8,000 houses were destroyed or damaged, as well as 51 health centers and 146 schools affected. Rain accumulations were estimated by weather satellite to be of the order of 130 mm in 24 hours, approximately the normal rainfall for the entire month of March. The Electricidade de Moçambique reported a damage of 10 million meticais (US$157,000) due to Filipo.

=== Tropical Cyclone Gamane ===
- Tropical cyclone (MFR)
- Category 2 tropical cyclone (SSHWS)
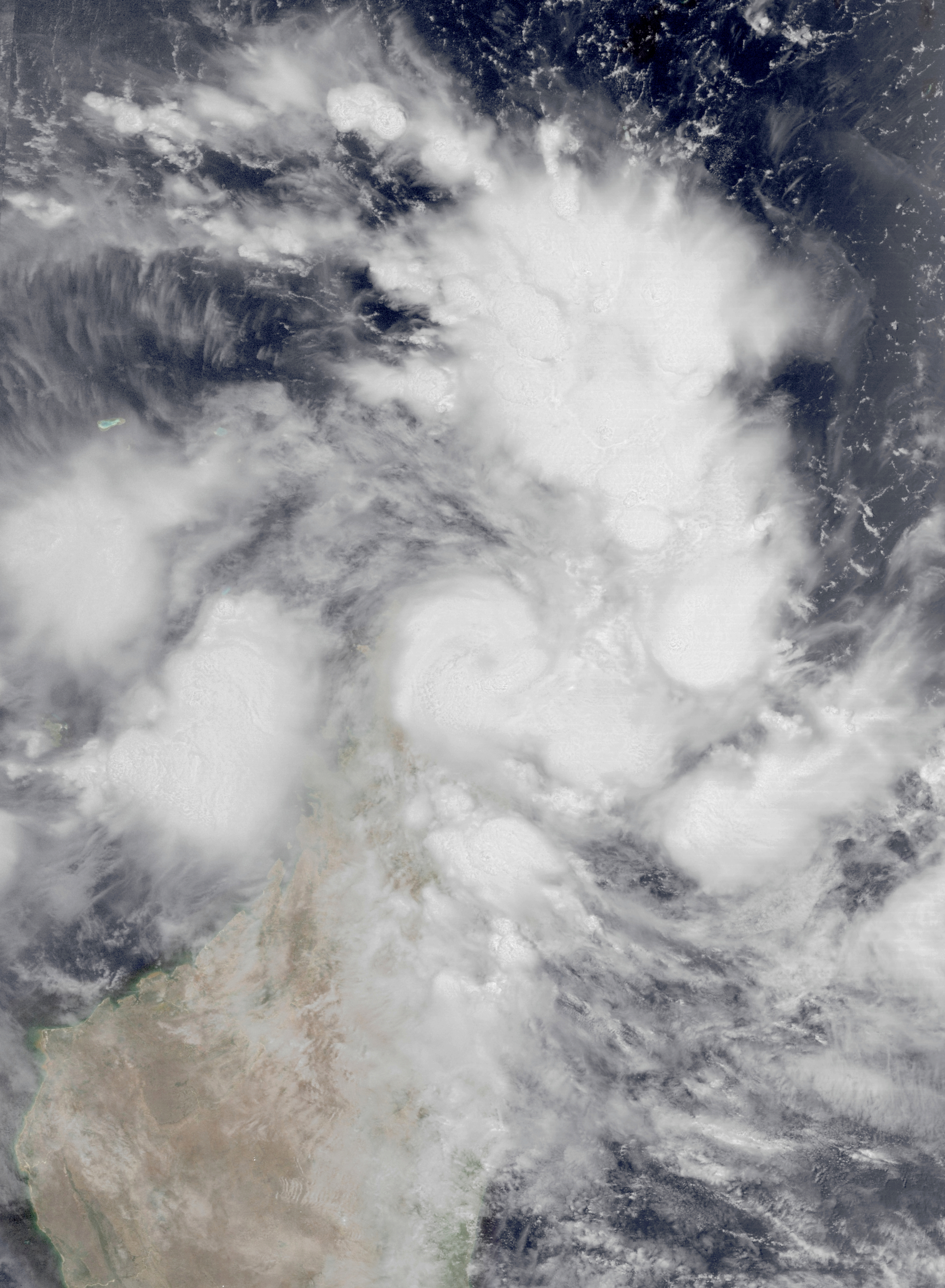
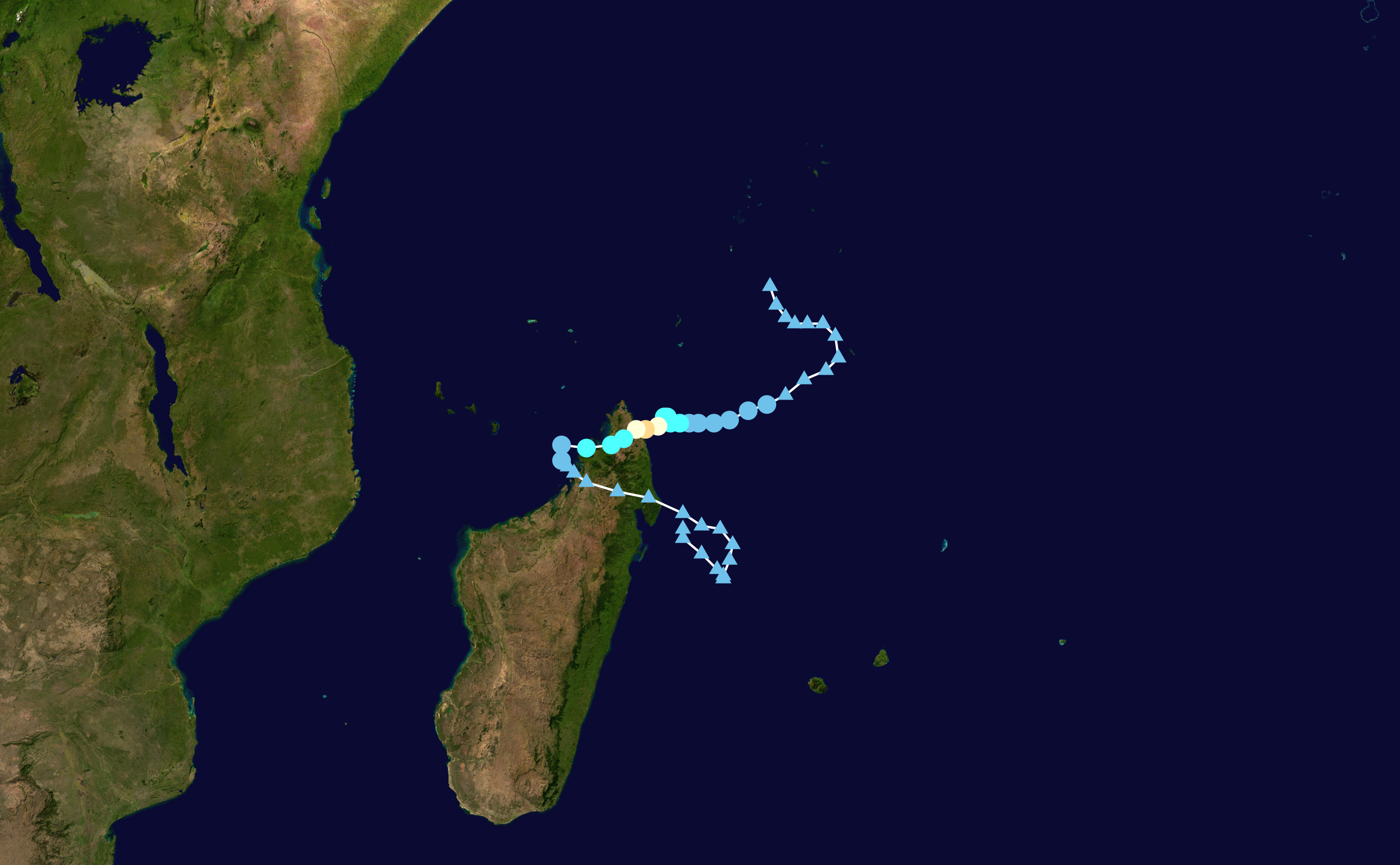
- Duration: 25 March – 28 March
- Peak intensity: 140 km/h (85 mph) (10-min); 972 hPa (mbar)

On 25 March, a zone of disturbed weather emerged 398 nautical miles north-northeast of Toamasina, Madagascar. MFR began issuing bulletins for a potential tropical cyclone that could form in the upcoming days. A few hours later, JTWC followed suit and issued a TCFA, indicating a low-level circulation with a symmetric area of deep persistent convection obscuring the center. On the next day, JTWC designated the disturbance as Tropical Cyclone 20S. A few hours later, 20S rapidly intensified into a severe tropical storm and was assigned the name Gamane by the MMS. On 27 March, Gamane gained additional strength, further intensifying into a Category 2-equivalent tropical cyclone. Its LLCC continued to improve as it moved into more favorable conditions structurally. At 03:00 UTC, Gamane made landfall on the east coast of Madagascar, just north of Vohémar. From this point, land interaction caused Gamane to weaken significantly — in the morning of 28 March, satellite imagery demonstrated that its deep central and feeder band convection had become disorganized as it tracked inland over the mountainous terrain of Northern Madagascar. MFR issued its final warning after Gamane degenerated into a disturbance on March 28 at 12:00 UTC.

According to a preliminary report on 28 March, Gamane generated heavy rains and floods which caused 18 deaths, one missing person, more than 2,500 displaced, and more than 600 houses flooded or damaged in the regions of Sava, Analanjirofo and Diana. The authorities reported that Sambava District received 300 mm of rain in 24 hours. Accessibility to this region is difficult in normal times and the road connecting it to the capital has been cut by the rain, which makes the arrival of aid very slow. On April 3, the total was raised to 19 deaths, 3 people missing and at least 90,000 affected. Overall, the cyclone caused a loss of 339 billion ariary (US$77.4 million) on the island.

=== Tropical Cyclone Hidaya ===
- Tropical cyclone (MFR)
- Category 1 tropical cyclone (SSHWS)
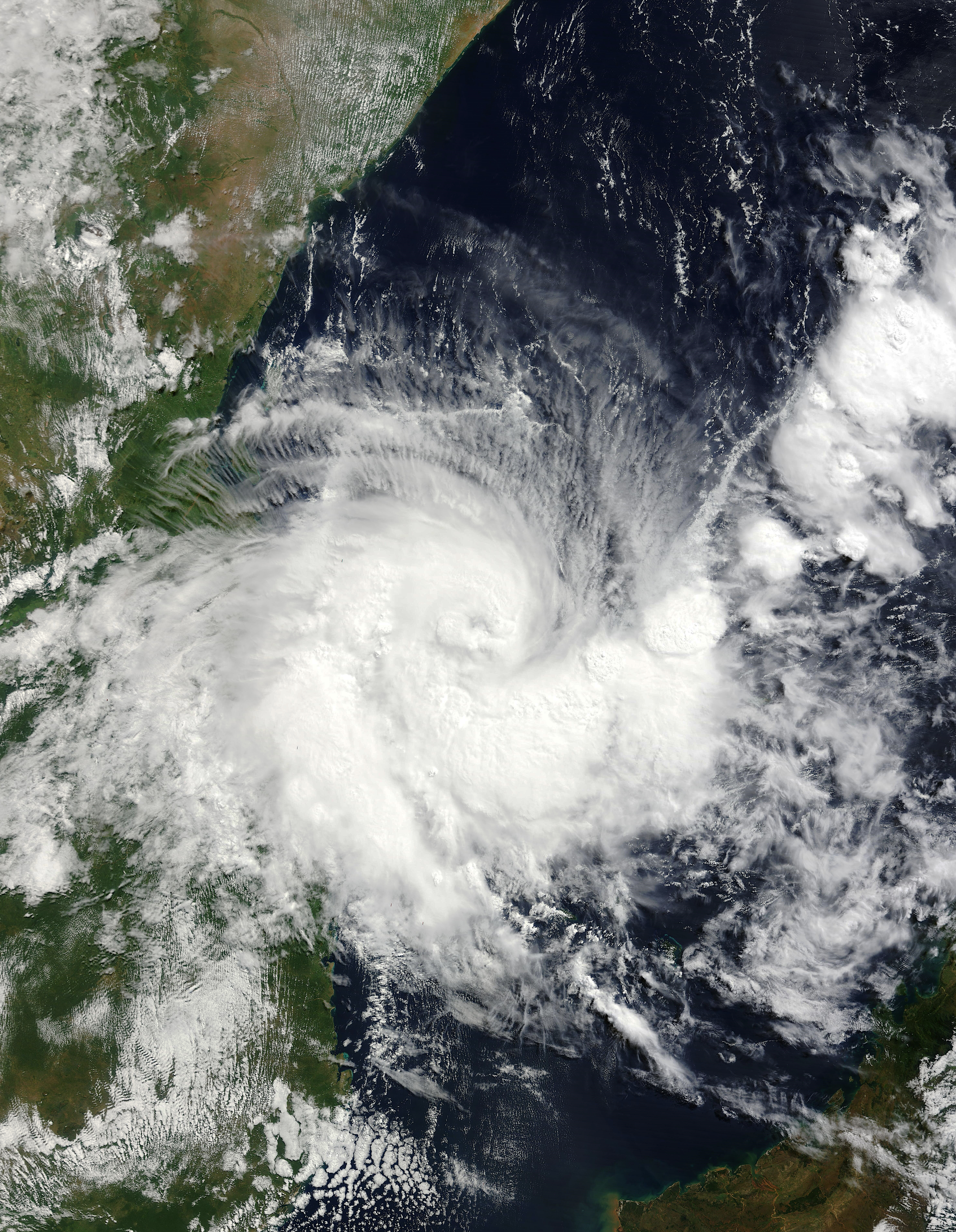
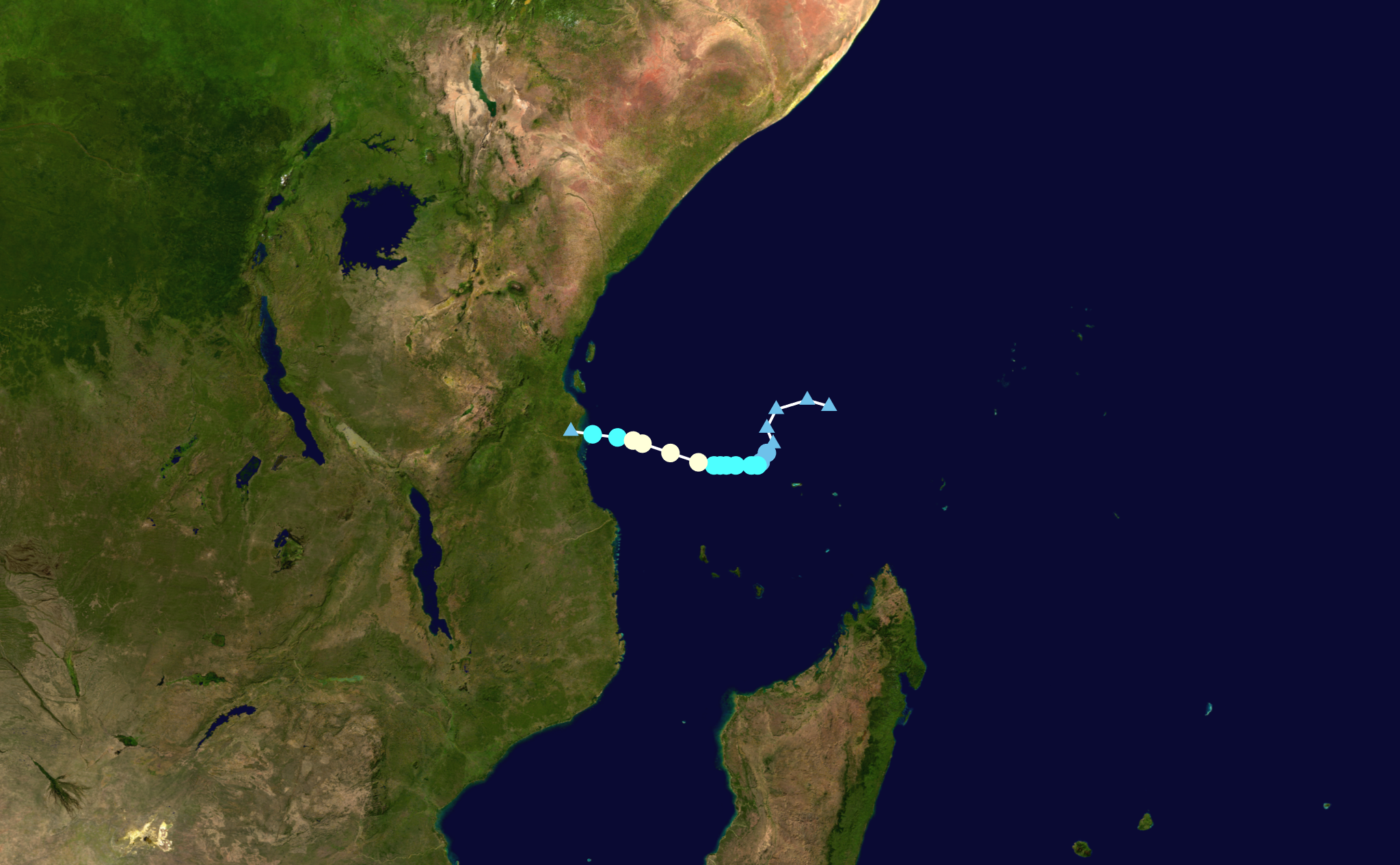
- Duration: 30 April – 4 May
- Peak intensity: 150 km/h (90 mph) (10-min); 967 hPa (mbar)

On 30 April, a zone of disturbed weather was formed near Seychelles. Later, MFR started issuing initial advisories that could form in the following days. JTWC followed suit and also issued a TCFA. On 2 May, its LLCC became organized, which resulted in gaining the name Hidaya from the MMS. JTWC also followed suit and gave its identifier as Tropical Cyclone 23S. Hidaya's low-level circulation center and its deep convective banding began to wrap into the system along the southern semicircle of the system. On 3 May, Hidaya rapidly intensified into a Category-1 cyclone after it drastically symmetrized over the past 12 hours. Later that day, Hidaya peaked with 1-minute sustained winds of 80 knots. As it approached Tanzania, Hidaya was downgraded back into a severe tropical storm. Satellite imagery shows that it began rapidly eroding, with its convective activity diminished, and the cloud tops considerably warmed. At 14:00 UTC, Hidaya made landfall in Kilindoni, Tanzania as a weakening tropical storm. Signs of rapid weakening ensued as it moved inland. All agencies discontinued their advisories on May 4 as Hidaya further moved through landmass.

Hidaya was a rare example in recorded history of a tropical cyclone or depression making landfall in Tanzania, other examples being a cyclone passing over Zanzibar in 1872, an unnamed cyclone in 1952 and Tropical Depression Atang in 2002. Additionally, it was the most intense recorded cyclone to occur in this region in the Indian ocean. Due to the storm, ferry service between Zanzibar and Dar es Salaam was temporarily halted. The cyclone struck after weeks of flooding across the region, adding to the destruction and death toll. Hidaya killed at least five people in Tanzania, including a fisherman from Pemba Island who drowned during the storm. The storm also damaged or destroyed 1,555 houses, while also washing out a portion of the Lindi-Dar es Salaam highway. Hidaya's wind gusts also knocked down trees and also resulted in power outages. According to the World Bank, damage across the nation were about US$184.45 million.

=== Tropical Cyclone Ialy ===
- Tropical cyclone (MFR)
- Category 1 tropical cyclone (SSHWS)
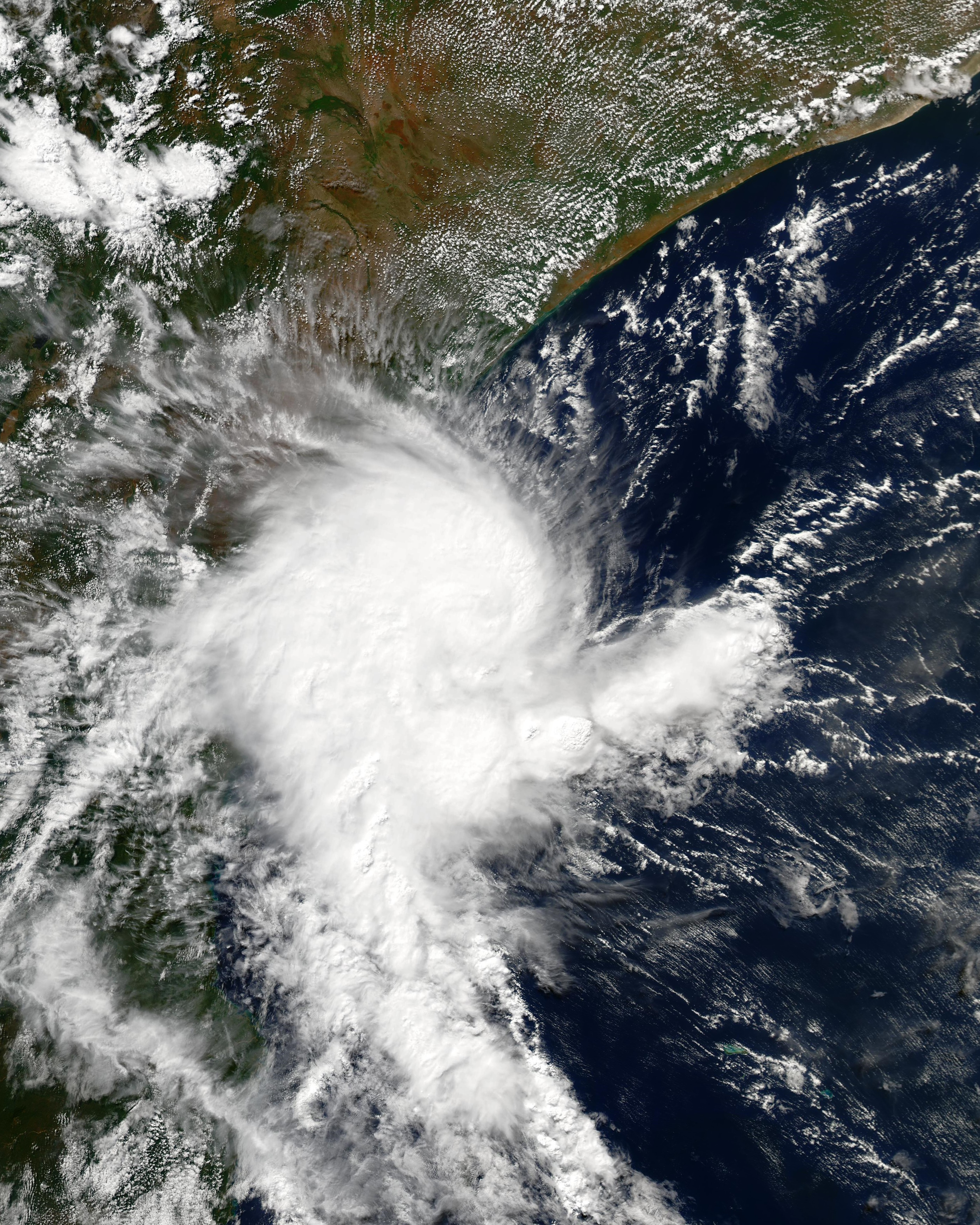
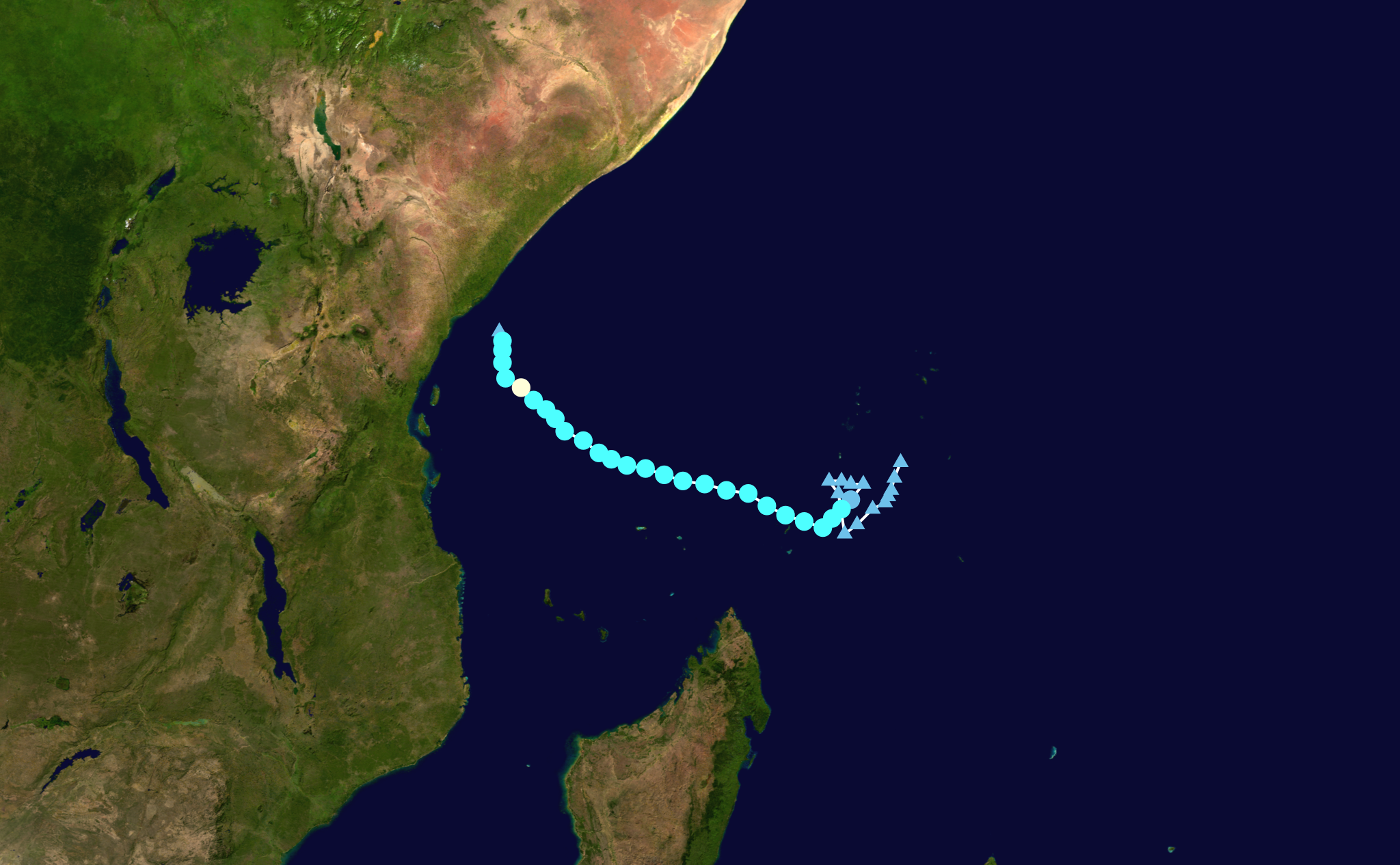
- Duration: 16 May – 22 May
- Peak intensity: 120 km/h (75 mph) (10-min); 981 hPa (mbar)

On 13 May, the Joint Typhoon Warning Center began monitoring a low-level circulation which persisted 588 nm east-northeast of Comoros, stating it was in a favourable environment to intensify. Two days later, the JTWC upgraded its chance of developing to medium as the circulation consolidated. By 16 May, the JTWC issued a TCFA on the burgeoning system, stating that deep convection was occurring on the southern portion of the system. Soon after, the MFR recognized the circulation as a zone of disturbed weather. Soon afterwards, the MMS received the name Ialy after the agency upgraded the system into a tropical storm. The JTWC then also recognised the system as a cyclone, issuing warnings on it as Tropical Cyclone 24S. Steadily intensifying, Ialy reached an initial peak intensity with 1-minute sustained winds of 45 kn (50 mph) the next day before wind shear began eroding the system. On May 19, Ialy was upgraded into a severe tropical storm by the MFR as the system became more compact. Ialy battled through high shear and became a Tropical Cyclone per MFR and a Category 1-equivalent cyclone per JTWC during the afternoon of May 21 local time. However, shear rapidly overcame Ialy, and 24 hours after peaking, Ialy had degenerated into a weak low pressure system per MFR. The JTWC also issued their final warning early on May 22 as Ialy was about to fall below tropical storm strength and was starting to rapidly dissipate just offshore Kenya.

In Kenya, the cyclone killed two people. Strong winds tore off the roof of a school, killing a girl and injuring four others, while another person died due to a fallen wall. Ialy is notable for being the strongest cyclone to have ever affected Kenyan waters and the first to directly affect the country since the beginning of reliable records.

=== Other systems ===
- On 24 March, the remnants of Cyclone Neville entered the area of responsibility of Météo-France (MFR) after crossing the 90th meridian east from the Australian region. At the time, the system was assessed as a filling depression, with maximum 10-minute sustained winds of 75 km/h (45 mph) and a central atmospheric pressure of 1,006 hPa (29.71 inHg). Due to the decreased convective activity, it was agreed that the MFR would not provide official information on the system. The cyclone's convective structure swiftly deteriorated, and Neville's LLLC soon became exposed, causing the United States Joint Typhoon Warning Center (JTWC) to discontinue advisories. Afterwards, the system was last mentioned by the MFR while located approximately 1,371 kilometres (850 mi) to the west of Learmonth, Western Australia.
- On 17 May, a low-level circulation formed north of Diego Garcia. On 19 May, the JTWC declared that the cyclone Invest, designated 25S, had formed abnormally close to the Equator. However, MFR did not recognize this system as a tropical cyclone, and gave it a high chance of developing into a tropical storm. It dissipated due to being in an extremely unfavorable environment by 21 May.

== Storm names ==
Within the South-West Indian Ocean, tropical and subtropical cyclones that are judged to have 10-minute sustained winds of 65 km/h (40 mph) by the Regional Specialized Meteorological Center on Réunion island, France (RSMC La Réunion) are usually assigned a name by the Sub-Regional Tropical Cyclone Advisory Centers in Mauritius and Madagascar. The Sub-Regional Tropical Cyclone Advisory Center (Mauritius Meteorological Services) in Mauritius names cyclones when they intensify into a moderate tropical storm between 55°E and 90°E, while the Sub-Regional Tropical Cyclone Advisory Center (Meteo Madagascar) in Madagascar names cyclones when they intensify into a moderate tropical storm between 30°E and 55°E. Storm names are taken from three pre-determined lists of names, which rotate on a triennial basis, with names used in the season being automatically removed. The new names this season are Alvaro, Belal, Candice, Djoungou, Eleanor, Filipo, Gamane, Hidaya, Ialy, and Jeremy which replaced Alicia, Bongoyo, Chalane, Danilo, Eloise, Faraji, Guambe, Habana, Iman, and Jobo in the 2020–21 season.

- Alvaro
- Belal
- Candice
- Djoungou
- Eleanor
- Filipo
- Gamane
- Hidaya
- Ialy
- Jeremy (unused)
- Kanga (unused)
- Ludzi (unused)
- Melina (unused)
- Noah (unused)
- Onias (unused)
- Pelagie (unused)
- Quamar (unused)
- Rita (unused)
- Solani (unused)
- Tarik (unused)
- Urilia (unused)
- Vuyane (unused)
- Wagner (unused)
- Xusa (unused)
- Yarona (unused)
- Zacarias (unused)

If a tropical cyclone enters the South-West Indian basin from the Australian region basin (west of 90°E), it will retain the name assigned to it by the Bureau of Meteorology (BoM) or the Meteorology, Climatology, and Geophysical Agency (BMKG). The following storms were named in this manner:

- Anggrek
- Neville

After the season, the nine names used were automatically retired and replaced with Agueda, Bertrand, Celiwe, Dira, Emmie, Fikri, Gumbo, Hisna, and Isaura, respectively for the 2026–27 season. The names Pelagie and Wagner were removed from the list despite not being used. They were replaced by Pitsana and Wafula respectively.

== Season effects ==
This table lists all of the tropical and subtropical cyclones that were monitored during the 2023–2024 South-West Indian Ocean cyclone season. Information on their intensity, duration, name, areas affected, primarily comes from RSMC La Réunion, however, death and damage reports come from either press reports or the relevant national disaster management agency. The damage totals are given in 2023 or 2024 USD.

| Name | Dates | Peak intensity | | | Areas affected | Damage (USD) | Deaths | Ref(s). |
| Name | Dates | Category | Wind speed | Pressure | Areas affected | Damage (USD) | Deaths | Ref(s). |
|---|---|---|---|---|---|---|---|---|
| Alvaro | 30 December – 3 January | Tropical cyclone | 120 km/h (75 mph) | 982 hPa (29.00 inHg) | Mozambique, Madagascar | $1 million | 19 | |
| Belal | 11 – 18 January | Tropical cyclone | 140 km/h (85 mph) | 969 hPa (28.61 inHg) | Mascarene Islands | $275 million | 6 | |
| Candice | 22 – 27 January | Severe tropical storm | 100 km/h (65 mph) | 980 hPa (28.94 inHg) | Mauritius | None | None | |
| Anggrek | 25 – 30 January | Intense tropical cyclone | 185 km/h (115 mph) | 950 hPa (28.05 inHg) | None | None | None | |
| 05 | 28 January – 2 February | Tropical depression | 55 km/h (35 mph) | 999 hPa (29.50 inHg) | None | None | None | |
| Djoungou | 13 – 19 February | Intense tropical cyclone | 215 km/h (130 mph) | 920 hPa (27.17 inHg) | None | None | None | |
| Eleanor | 17 – 24 February | Severe tropical storm | 100 km/h (65 mph) | 984 hPa (29.06 inHg) | Mauritius, Réunion | Minimal | None | |
| Filipo | 2 – 14 March | Severe tropical storm | 100 km/h (65 mph) | 989 hPa (29.21 inHg) | Madagascar, Mayotte, Mozambique, Eswatini, South Africa | $157,000 | 2 | |
| Gamane | 25 – 28 March | Tropical cyclone | 150 km/h (90 mph) | 970 hPa (28.64 inHg) | Madagascar | $75 million | 19 | |
| Hidaya | 30 April – 4 May | Tropical cyclone | 140 km/h (85 mph) | 975 hPa (28.79 inHg) | Seychelles, Comoro Islands, Tanzania, Kenya | $185 million | 5 | |
| Ialy | 16 – 22 May | Tropical cyclone | 120 km/h (75 mph) | 983 hPa (29.03 inHg) | Seychelles, Madagascar, Tanzania, Kenya, Somalia | Minimal | 2 | |
Season aggregates
| 12 systems | 30 December 2023 – 22 May 2024 | | 215 km/h (130 mph) | 922 hPa (27.23 inHg) | | $536 million | 53 | |

== See also ==
- Weather of 2023 and 2024
- List of Southern Hemisphere cyclone seasons
- Tropical cyclones in 2023 and 2024
- Atlantic hurricane seasons: 2023, 2024
- Pacific hurricane seasons: 2023, 2024
- Pacific typhoon seasons: 2023, 2024
- North Indian Ocean cyclone seasons: 2023, 2024
- 2023–24 Australian region cyclone season
- 2023–24 South Pacific cyclone season
