= 2024 Atlantic hurricane season =

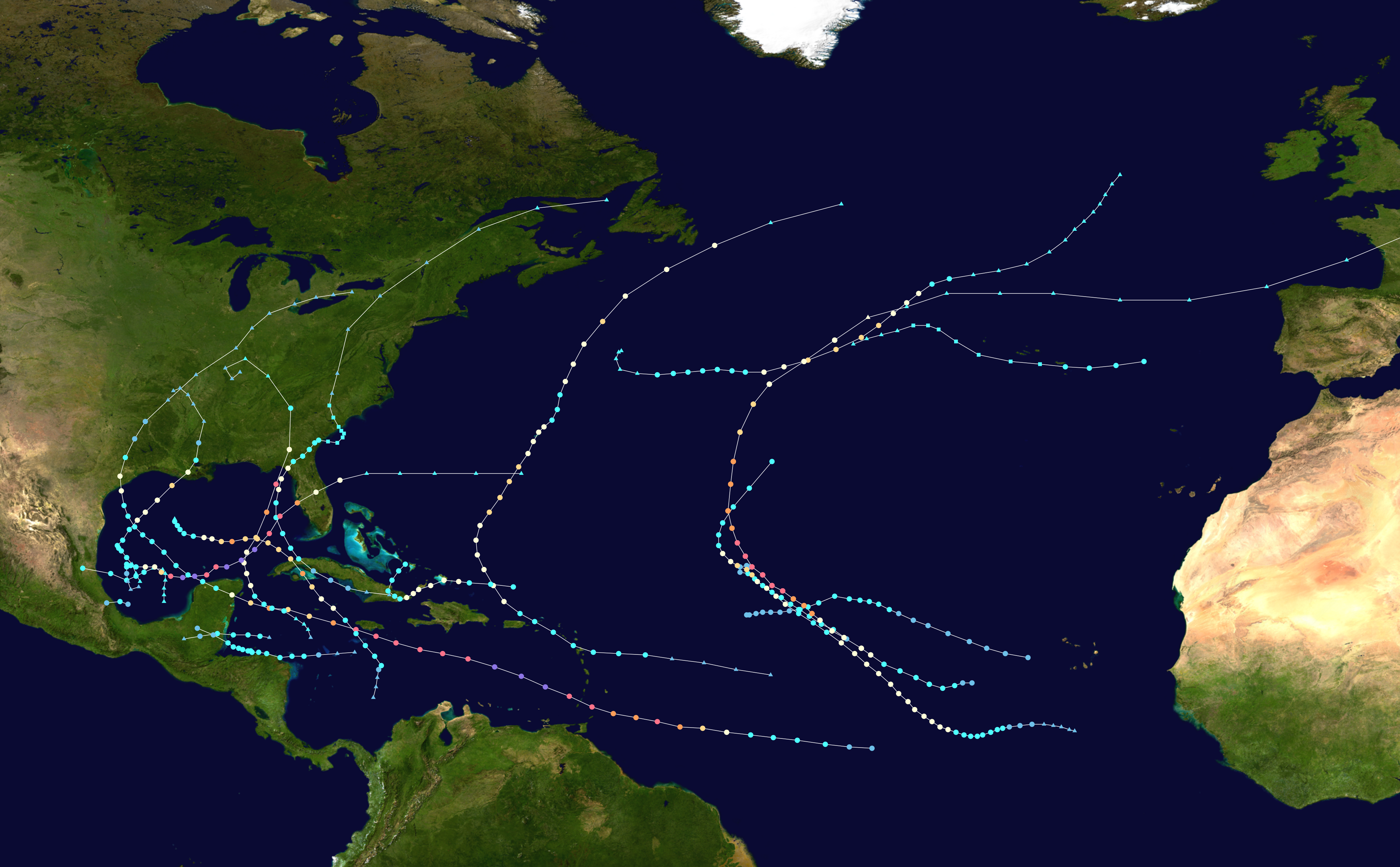
- Season summary map

Seasonal boundaries
- First system formed: June 19, 2024
- Last system dissipated: November 18, 2024

Strongest storm
- Name: Milton
  - Maximum winds: 180 mph (285 km/h) (1-minute sustained)
  - Lowest pressure: 895 mbar (hPa; 26.43 inHg)

Seasonal statistics
- Total depressions: 18
- Total storms: 18
- Hurricanes: 11
- Major hurricanes (Cat. 3+): 5
- ACE: 161.5
- Total fatalities: 442 total
- Total damage: $131 billion (2024 USD) (Third-costliest tropical cyclone season on record)

Related articles
- Timeline of the 2024 Atlantic hurricane season; 2024 Pacific hurricane season; 2024 Pacific typhoon season; 2024 North Indian Ocean cyclone season

The 2024 Atlantic hurricane season was an extremely active and destructive Atlantic hurricane season that became the third-costliest on record, behind only 2017 and 2005. The season featured 18 named storms, 11 hurricanes, and 5 major hurricanes; it was also the first since 2019 to feature multiple Category 5 hurricanes. Additionally, the season had the highest accumulated cyclone energy (ACE) rating since 2020, with a total value of 161.5 units. The season officially began on June 1 and ended on November 30. These dates, adopted by convention, have historically described the period in each year when most subtropical or tropical cyclogenesis occurs in the Atlantic Ocean.

The first system, Tropical Storm Alberto, developed on June 19 and then made landfall near Tampico, Tamaulipas, the next day. Afterward, two storms formed at the end of June, with the first, Hurricane Beryl, being a rare June major hurricane and only the second known Category 5 Atlantic hurricane in July, attaining this status on the earliest recorded date. Beryl caused significant impacts, especially in the Windward Islands and Texas, with over $9 billion in damage and 73 fatalities. (Note: All damage figures are in 2024 USD, unless otherwise noted) Next, Tropical Storm Chris formed on June 30 and quickly moved ashore Veracruz. Activity then went dormant for more than three weeks. In early August, Hurricane Debby developed in the Gulf of Mexico before striking Florida and South Carolina. Shortly thereafter came Hurricane Ernesto, which impacted the Lesser Antilles, Puerto Rico, Bermuda, and parts of Atlantic Canada in mid-August. After an unusual lull in activity in late August and early September, Hurricane Francine formed in the western Gulf of Mexico, then made landfall in Louisiana, inflicting about $1.3 billion in damage.

Activity dramatically increased in late September. Hurricane Helene developed over the western Caribbean and later made landfall in the Big Bend region of Florida at Category 4 strength, leading to disastrous flooding over central Appalachia that caused more than $78.7 billion in damage and 252 deaths. October was also very active, with four named storms developing during the month, all but one of which became hurricanes. The strongest, Hurricane Milton, formed in the Gulf of Mexico and explosively intensified into a Category 5 hurricane; it was also the most intense tropical cyclone worldwide in 2024. Milton later made landfall near Siesta Key, Florida, on October 9, as a Category 3 hurricane. The storm caused at least 39 deaths and $34.4 billion in damage, mostly in Florida. In mid-October, Tropical Storm Nadine and Hurricane Oscar formed in quick succession. The former quickly struck Belize while the latter achieved the smallest hurricane-force wind field on record in the Atlantic. It struck Grand Turk Island and Cuba. In early November, Hurricane Rafael struck western Cuba at Category 3 strength, before moving into the Gulf of Mexico and becoming tied for the strongest November Gulf hurricane. In mid-November, the last system, Tropical Storm Sara, drifted along the north coast of Honduras before striking Belize, while producing widespread heavy rainfall resulting in severe flash flooding and mudslides across northern Central America. Collectively, the cyclones of the 2024 season caused about $131 billion in damage and 442 fatalities.

All forecasting agencies predicted an above-average season, primarily due to expected warmer-than-normal sea surface temperatures and an ongoing La Nina event. Although the season ultimately finished above-average, a heat dome mostly suppressed early activity, while little tropical cyclogenesis occurred from mid-July to mid-September due to the Saharan air layer (SAL), atmospheric stability, strong wind shear, and an unfavorable Madden–Julian oscillation pattern.

== Seasonal forecasts ==
Predictions of tropical activity in the 2024 season
Source	Date	Named storms	Hurricanes	Major hurricanes	Ref
Average (1991–2020)		14.4	7.2	3.2
Record high activity		30	15	7†
Record low activity		1	0†	0†
TSR	December 11, 2023	20	9	4
CSU	April 4, 2024	23	11	5
MFM	April 5, 2024	21	11	N/A
TSR	April 8, 2024	23	11	5
UA	April 8, 2024	21	11	5
MU	April 12, 2024	26	11	5
NCSU	April 16, 2024	15–20	10–12	3–4
UPenn	April 24, 2024	27–39	N/A	N/A
SMN	May 6, 2024	20–23	9–11	4–5
UKMO*	May 22, 2024	22	12	4
NOAA	May 23, 2024	17–25	8–13	4–7
TSR	May 30, 2024	24	12	6
CSU	June 12, 2024	23	11	5
UA	June 23, 2024	23	10	5
TSR	July 5, 2024	26	13	6
CSU	July 10, 2024	25	12	6
TSR	August 6, 2024	24	12	6
CSU	August 6, 2024	23	12	6
NOAA	August 8, 2024	17–24	8–13	4–7
	Actual activity	18	11	5
* June–November only † Most recent of several such occurrences. (See all)

In advance of, and during, each hurricane season, several forecasts of hurricane activity are issued by national meteorological services, scientific agencies, and noted hurricane experts. These include forecasters from the United States National Oceanic and Atmospheric Administration (NOAA)'s Climate Prediction Center, Tropical Storm Risk (TSR), the United Kingdom's Met Office (UKMO), and Colorado State University (CSU). The forecasts include weekly and monthly changes in significant factors that help determine the number of tropical storms, hurricanes, and major hurricanes within a particular year.

According to NOAA and CSU, the average Atlantic hurricane season between 1991 and 2020 contained roughly 14 tropical storms, 7 hurricanes, 3 major hurricanes, and an accumulated cyclone energy (ACE) index of 72–111 units. Broadly speaking, ACE is a measure of the power of a tropical or subtropical storm multiplied by the length of time it existed. It is only calculated for full advisories on specific tropical and subtropical systems reaching or exceeding wind speeds of 39 mph (63 km/h). NOAA typically categorizes a season as above-average, average, or below-average based on the cumulative ACE index, but the number of tropical storms, hurricanes, and major hurricanes within a hurricane season is sometimes also considered.

=== Pre-season forecasts ===
On December 11, 2023, TSR released its extended range forecast for the 2024 season, predicting an above-average season with 20 named storms, 9 hurricanes, and 4 major hurricanes. (Note: Hurricanes reaching Category 3 and higher—1-minute sustained winds higher than 110 miles per hour (178 km/h)—on the Saffir–Simpson scale are described as major hurricanes.) They took into account ongoing warm sea-surface temperatures (SSTs) throughout most of the basin, specifically in the Main Development Region and in the Caribbean Sea on top of the 2023–2024 El Niño event which was predicted to weaken to a neutral phase by August 2024. CSU released its first forecast on April 4, calling for an extremely active hurricane season, with 23 named storms, 11 hurricanes and 5 major hurricanes, with an ACE index of 210 units, citing the extremely warm Atlantic SSTs and the development of a La Niña by the summer. On April 5, Météo-France (MFM) issued a prediction of 21 named storms and 11 hurricanes. They cited warm SSTs, wind patterns, and humidity. TSR updated their forecast on April 8, predicting 23 tropical storms, 11 hurricanes, and 5 major hurricanes, with an ACE index of 217 units. They predicted that moderate La Niña conditions would occur in the summer and persist into fall and above average SSTs would also persist into summer. The University of Arizona (UA) posted their forecast on the same day, calling for a very active season featuring 21 named storms, 11 hurricanes, 5 major hurricanes, and an ACE index of 156 units. On April 12, University of Missouri (MU) issued their prediction of 26 named storms, 11 hurricanes, and 5 major hurricanes. North Carolina State University (NCSU) issued their prediction on April 16, with 15–20 named storms, 10–12 hurricanes, and 3–4 major hurricanes. On April 24, the University of Pennsylvania (UPenn) issued their prediction of a record-breaking season, predicting an unprecedented 33 (±6) named storms. They cited expected moderate La Niña conditions and record-warm SSTs in the tropical Atlantic tied to large-scale warming.

On May 6, the Servicio Meteorológico Nacional (SMN) issued their forecast of 20–23 tropical storms, 9–11 hurricanes, and 4–5 major hurricanes. On May 22, UKMO published their forecast for the 2024 season, calling for 22 named storms, 12 hurricanes, and 4 major hurricanes, and an ACE index of 212 units. One day later, NOAA published their hurricane season prediction, forecasting an above-average season of 17–25 named storms, 8–13 hurricanes, and 4–7 major hurricanes with an 85% chance of being an above-average season. TSR updated their predictions on May 30 with 24 tropical storms, 12 hurricanes, and 6 major hurricanes with an ACE of 226.

=== Mid-season forecasts ===
On June 11, CSU also updated its predictions, continuing to expect an extremely active season, with 23 tropical storms, 11 hurricanes, five major hurricanes, and an ACE of 210. On June 23, UA updated its prediction with 23 named storms, 10 hurricanes, five major hurricanes, and an ACE of 231. TSR updated its predictions on July 5 with 26 tropical storms, 13 hurricanes, and six major hurricanes with an ACE of 240. On July 9, CSU updated its predictions, anticipating an even more active season, with 25 tropical storms, 12 hurricanes, six major hurricanes, and an ACE of 230. On August 8, NOAA updated its prediction of the total number of named storms slightly, while still anticipating a highly active season.

== Seasonal summary ==
=== Background ===
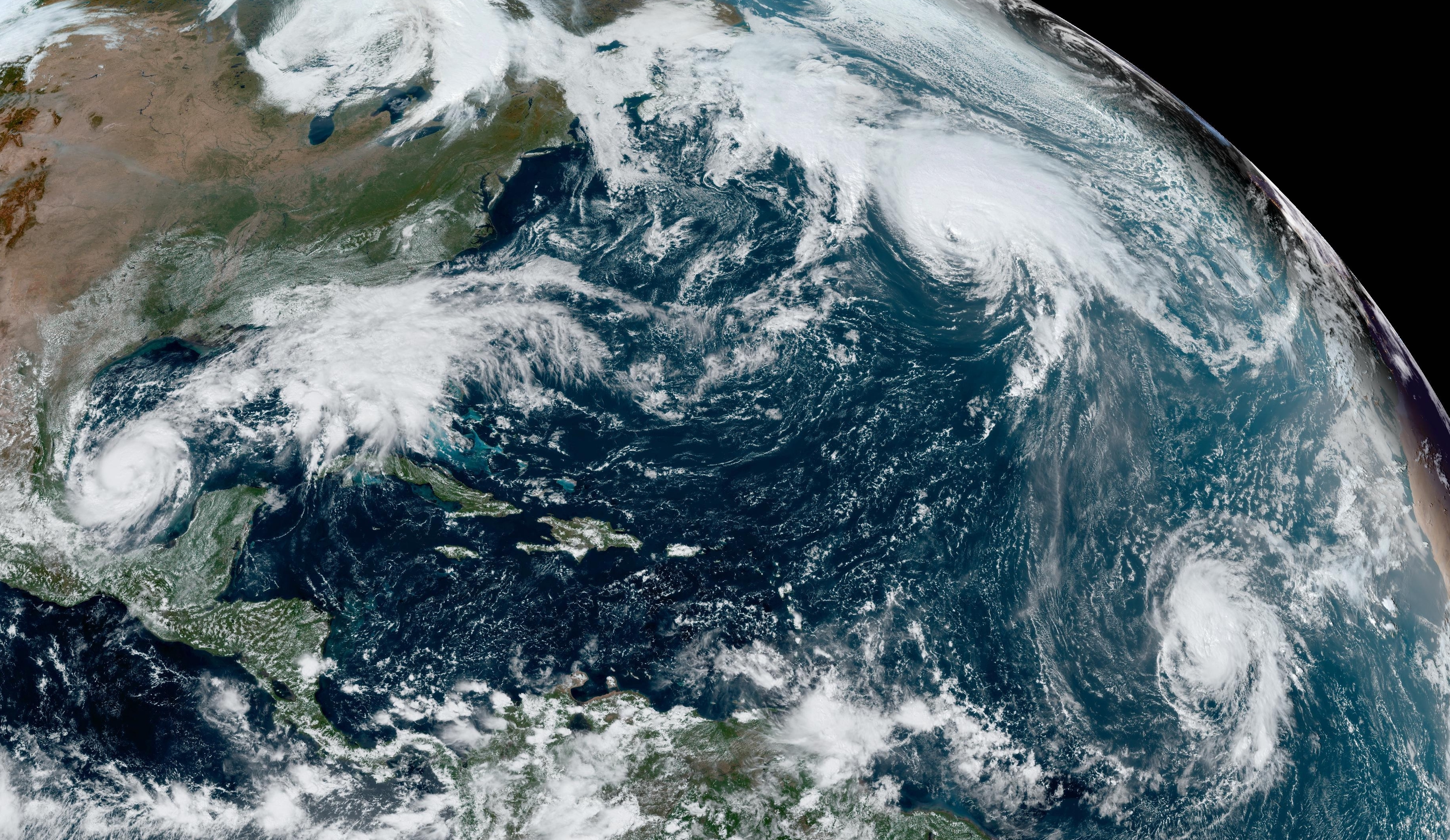
Three hurricanes simultaneously active on October 6, with Milton (left), Kirk (top right), and Leslie (lower right)

Officially, the 2024 Atlantic hurricane season began on June 1 and ended on November 30. In all, 18 tropical cyclones formed, and all of them became named storms. Of those, 11 storms intensified into hurricanes and 5 strengthened into major hurricanes. Additionally, one potential tropical cyclone that was designated did not develop into a tropical cyclone. Three hurricanes made landfall in Florida during the season – only the sixth such occurrence since records began, after 1871, 1886, 1964, 2004, and 2005. Overall, five hurricanes struck the continental United States, tied with 1893, 2004, and 2005 for the second-most. This season's ACE index, as calculated officially by the National Hurricane Center (NHC), was approximately 161.5 units, the highest value recorded since 2020. This number represents the sum of the squares of the maximum sustained wind speed (knots) for all named storms while they are at least tropical storm intensity, divided by 10,000. Overall, the cyclones of the 2024 Atlantic hurricane season collectively caused about 442 fatalities and at least $131 billion in damage, making it the third-costliest on record, behind only 2017 and 2005.

Though the 2024 Atlantic hurricane season officially began on June 1, it had its slowest start since 2014. This was due to a large stationary heat dome over Central America and Mexico, as tropical cyclogenesis in June often occurs over the Gulf of Mexico and northern Caribbean Sea. Despite the unseasonably warm temperatures in the North Atlantic, the equatorial Atlantic cooled rapidly into an "Atlantic Niña" due to upwelling caused by shifts in the trade winds and the Atlantic zonal mode. The effects of an Atlantic Niña is not certain but it is contrary to the assumptions that the NOAA used in their forecast of seasonal activity. CSU associated the quietness of the Atlantic during the month of August and the period after Ernesto dissipated–despite predictions of an extremely active peak period–to tropical waves forming too far north, warm upper-level winds causing destabilization, wind shear in the East Atlantic, and factors associated with the Madden–Julian oscillation.

Throughout the season, NOAA's Hurricane Hunter aircraft conducted flights totaling 392 hours, which included passing through the eye of a cyclone about 80 times and deploying over 1,246 scientific instruments. Among the technology used, NOAA deployed 91 Skyfora StreamSondes and 17 Black Swift Technologies S0 uncrewed aircraft systems to study and research "hard-to-reach areas of the storms." Over 100 gliders recorded ocean conditions, including sea surface temperatures. Additionally, the National Ocean Service, a division of NOAA, surveyed almost 365 mi (585 km) of coastline impacted by hurricanes Debby, Francine, Helene, and Milton, capturing over 26,000 images in the process.

=== Early-season activity ===
The season seen through outlooks from the National Hurricane Center

The season's first named storm, Tropical Storm Alberto, formed in the western Gulf of Mexico on June 19, (Note: The average formation date of the first named Atlantic tropical storm is June 20.) then proceeded to make landfall on the northeastern coast of Mexico the following day. Next came Hurricane Beryl, the earliest-forming Category 4 and Category 5 Atlantic hurricane on record in a season and the strongest June and July hurricane on record in the basin in the main development region (MDR). The storm rapidly intensified as it approached the Windward Islands, peaking as a Category 5 hurricane early on July 2 after reaching the eastern Caribbean. The previous record-holder, Emily in 2005, became a Category 5 hurricane on July 17. Short-lived Tropical Storm Chris developed in the southwestern Gulf of Mexico on June 30, quickly moving ashore in Mexico the following morning. Beryl continued on, impacting Jamaica and striking the Yucatán Peninsula and Texas. After Beryl dissipated on July 11, the Atlantic basin would fall under a period of inactivity due to the Saharan air layer, which suppresses tropical activity, persisting over the open Atlantic alongside dry air typically occurring during this period of the season.

Activity resumed at the start of August, with Hurricane Debby developing in the Gulf of Mexico on August 3, before making landfall in Florida as a Category 1 hurricane two days later. It then slowed down over land afterwards and dropped heavy rain and caused widespread flooding in the Southeastern United States. A few days after Debby dissipated, Hurricane Ernesto formed on August 12 in the Western Main Development Region. Ernesto caused damage to the Lesser Antilles on August 14 as a Category 1 hurricane. Two days later, on August 16, it peaked as a Category 2 hurricane. The next day it made landfall at Bermuda as a weakening Category 1 storm.

=== Peak to late-season activity ===
List of costliest Atlantic hurricane seasons (as of 2026)
Rank	Cost	Season
1	≥ $294.811 billion	2017
2	$179.253 billion	2005
3	$131 billion	2024
4	$118 billion	2022
5	≥ $80.78 billion	2021
6	$72.34 billion	2012
7	$60.4 billion	2004
8	$54.336 billion	2020
9	≥ $50.526 billion	2018
10	≥ $49.53 billion	2008

Starting in mid-August, activity went dormant across the Atlantic for nearly three weeks, the longest in over fifty years at that point in the season. Hurricane Francine formed on September 9. Tropical Storm Gordon followed suit two days later on September 11, with Francine making landfall in Louisiana as a Category 2 system later that day. Four systems developed during the final week of September, starting with Hurricane Helene on September 24. The system affected the Yucatán Peninsula on September 25, before making landfall in the Big Bend region of Florida early on September 27 as a Category 4 hurricane. Helene weakened to a tropical storm over Georgia that day and merged with a cut-off low-pressure area several hours later over Kentucky. Hurricane Isaac formed on September 26 and later peaked as a Category 2 hurricane. On September 27, Tropical Storm Joyce formed just west of the Cabo Verde Islands. Activity in September ended with the formation of Hurricane Kirk on September 29, which reached its peak intensity on October 4.

Early October saw the formations of hurricanes Leslie and Milton, which, along with Kirk, marked the first time on record that there were three simultaneously active hurricanes in the Atlantic basin after September. Kirk and Leslie became the easternmost storms to attain hurricane status after September. Milton notably underwent explosive rapid intensification within the Gulf of Mexico to become the second Category 5 hurricane of the season, making 2024 the first Atlantic hurricane season since 2019 to feature multiple Category 5 hurricanes. It became one of the strongest hurricanes of record in the Atlantic basin, tying Hurricane Rita for the fourth-lowest minimum central pressure for an Atlantic hurricane. Milton was also the strongest tropical cyclone worldwide in 2024. Later in the month, two tropical cyclones formed on October 19. Tropical Storm Nadine formed early in the day near the coast of Belize, where it made landfall a few hours later, while Hurricane Oscar formed near Turks and Caicos, becoming the smallest hurricane on record in the Atlantic basin. On November 2, Tropical Storm Patty developed from a non-tropical gale low just northeast of the Azores. Next came Hurricane Rafael, which formed in the southwestern Caribbean. It made landfall in Cuba at Category 3 strength. Rafael tied 1985's Hurricane Kate as the strongest November hurricane on record in the Gulf of Mexico. Then, in mid-November, the final storm of the season, Tropical Storm Sara formed over the western Caribbean before striking the Yucatán and dissipating on November 18, just under two weeks before the official end of the season.

The season also broke or nearly broke records for activity from late September and beyond, including seven hurricanes after September 25 – the most ever known in the basin – and tying 2005 for named storms after September 23, with 11. The season also had the second-highest number of major hurricanes (4) after September 25 and second-highest ACE value (approximately 100 units) from September 24 onward, behind 2020 and 1878, respectively.

== Systems ==
=== Tropical Storm Alberto ===
- Tropical storm (SSHWS)
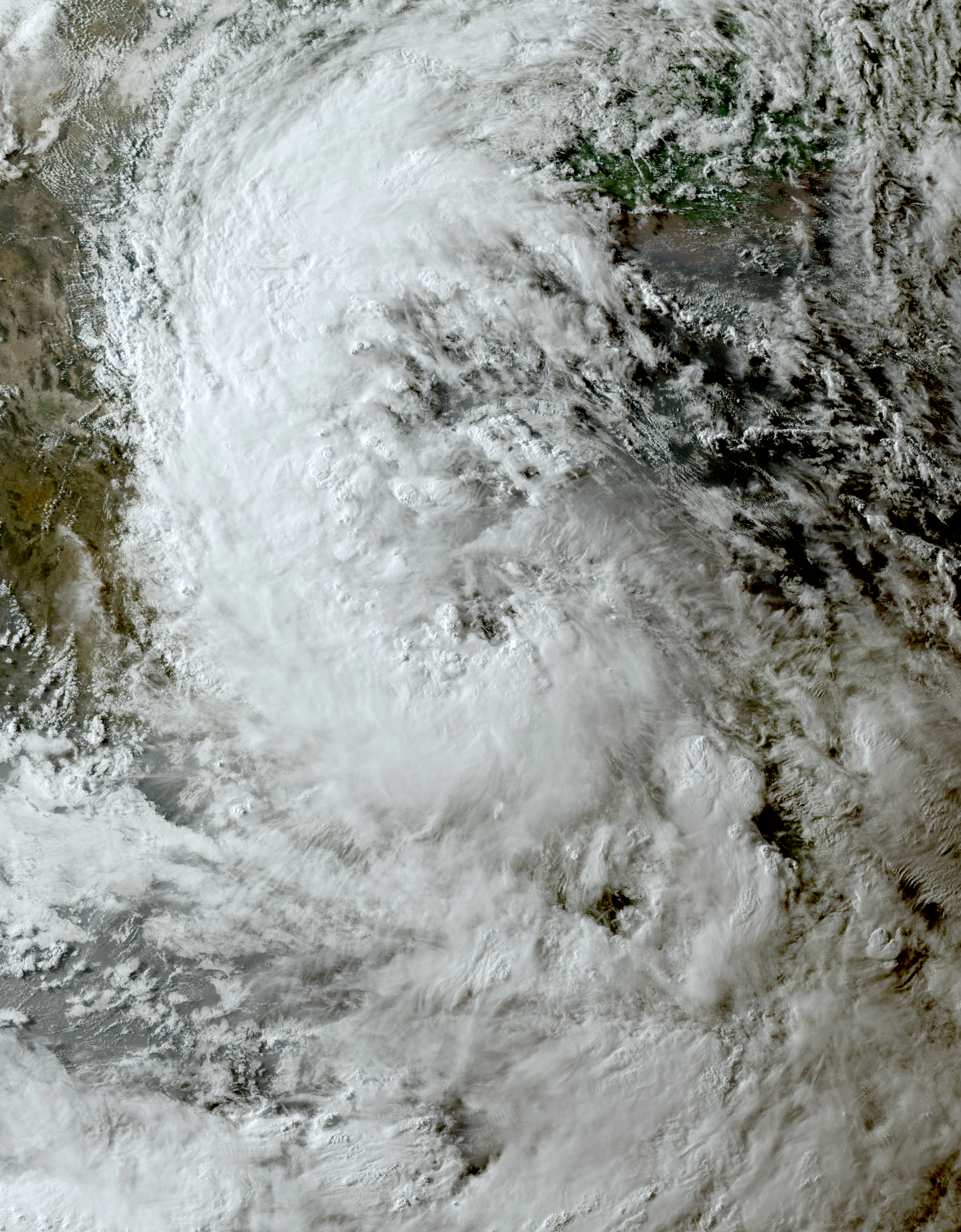
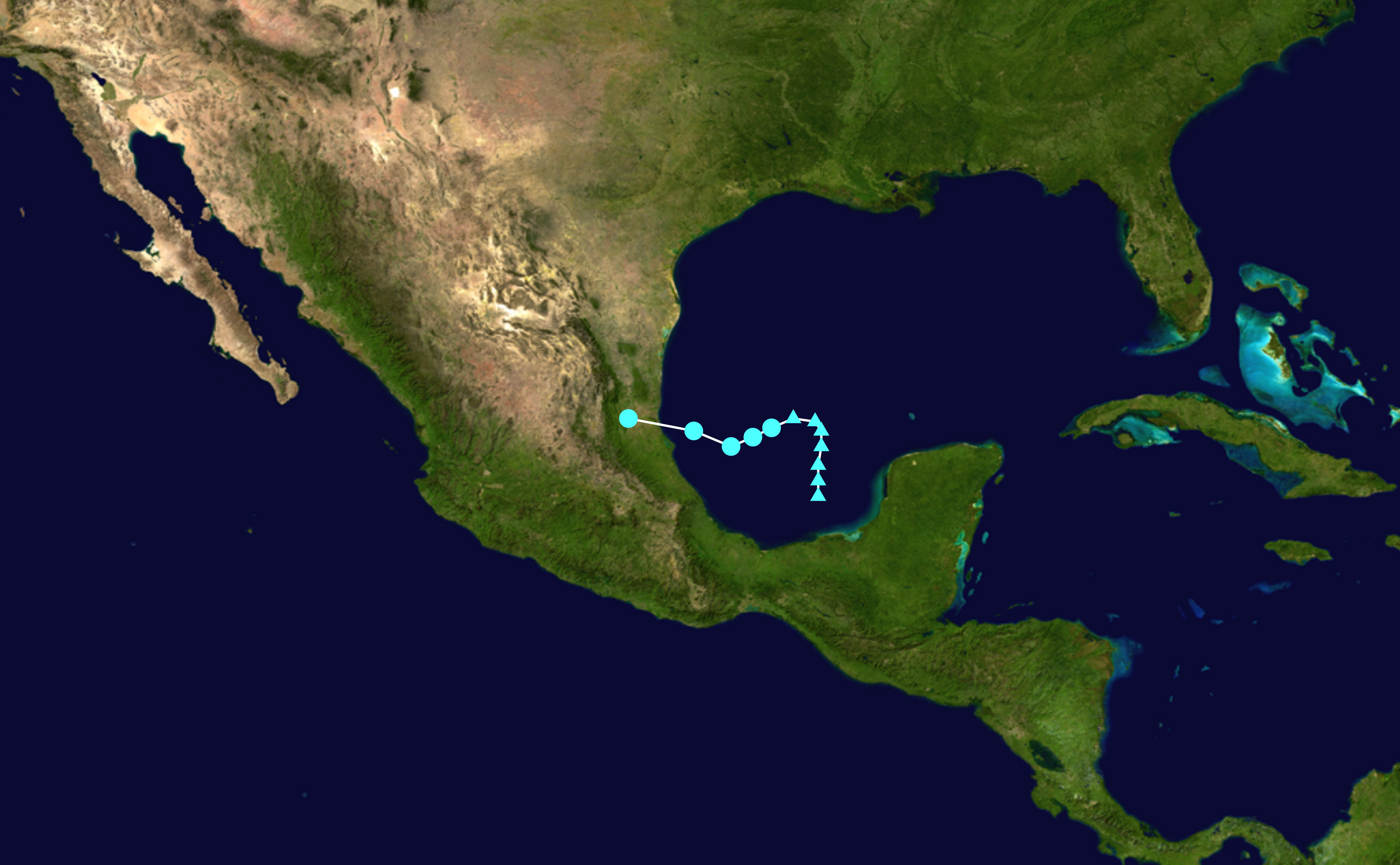
- Duration: June 19 – June 20
- Peak intensity: 50 mph (85 km/h) (1-min); 992 mbar (hPa)

A Central American gyre (CAG) resulted in the formation of convection over the Gulf of Tehuantepec on June 15. As the convective activity progressed northward over southeastern Mexico and exited into the Bay of Campeche, an area of low pressure gradually developed on June 17 about 105 mi (170 km) northwest of Ciudad del Carmen, Mexico. The system gradually became better organized, though it still remained rather broad, developing into Tropical Storm Alberto by 12:00 UTC on June 19. Under the influence of light vertical wind shear and warm waters, Alberto intensified up to landfall, attaining peak winds of 50 mph (85 km/h) and a minimum central pressure of 992 mbar (29.29 inHg) by the morning of June 20. Alberto moved ashore at 09:00 UTC that day near Tampico, Mexico, and rapidly weakened over land, dissipating just nine hours later.

The storm brought heavy rainfall to the states of Coahuila, Nuevo León, and Tamaulipas in northeast Mexico. Alberto resulted in five deaths in Mexico, all in Nuevo León, including one in Monterrey due to river flooding, one in El Carmen, and two in Allende (the latter three were indirect electrocution deaths). Aon estimated that US$140 million in damage occurred in Mexico. Alberto's large wind field produced tropical storm-force winds along the coastline of Texas. A 3–4 ft (0.9–1 m) storm surge inundated coastal communities between Corpus Christi Bay and Galveston, damaging piers, roads, and sand dunes, as well as causing several high-water rescues. One person drowned at Galveston due to rip currents generated by the storm. Alberto brought significant rainfall to the Galveston area, leading to freshwater flooding. Additionally, an EF1 tornado touched down near Bellville, causing some property damage, and two EF0 tornadoes occurred near Rockport. Damage from Alberto in Texas is estimated to be at US$125 million. To the east, coastal communities in Louisiana, especially Grand Isle, also received some flooding. Additionally, several roads became impassable in Hancock County, Mississippi, due to storm surge.

=== Hurricane Beryl ===
- Category 5 hurricane (SSHWS)
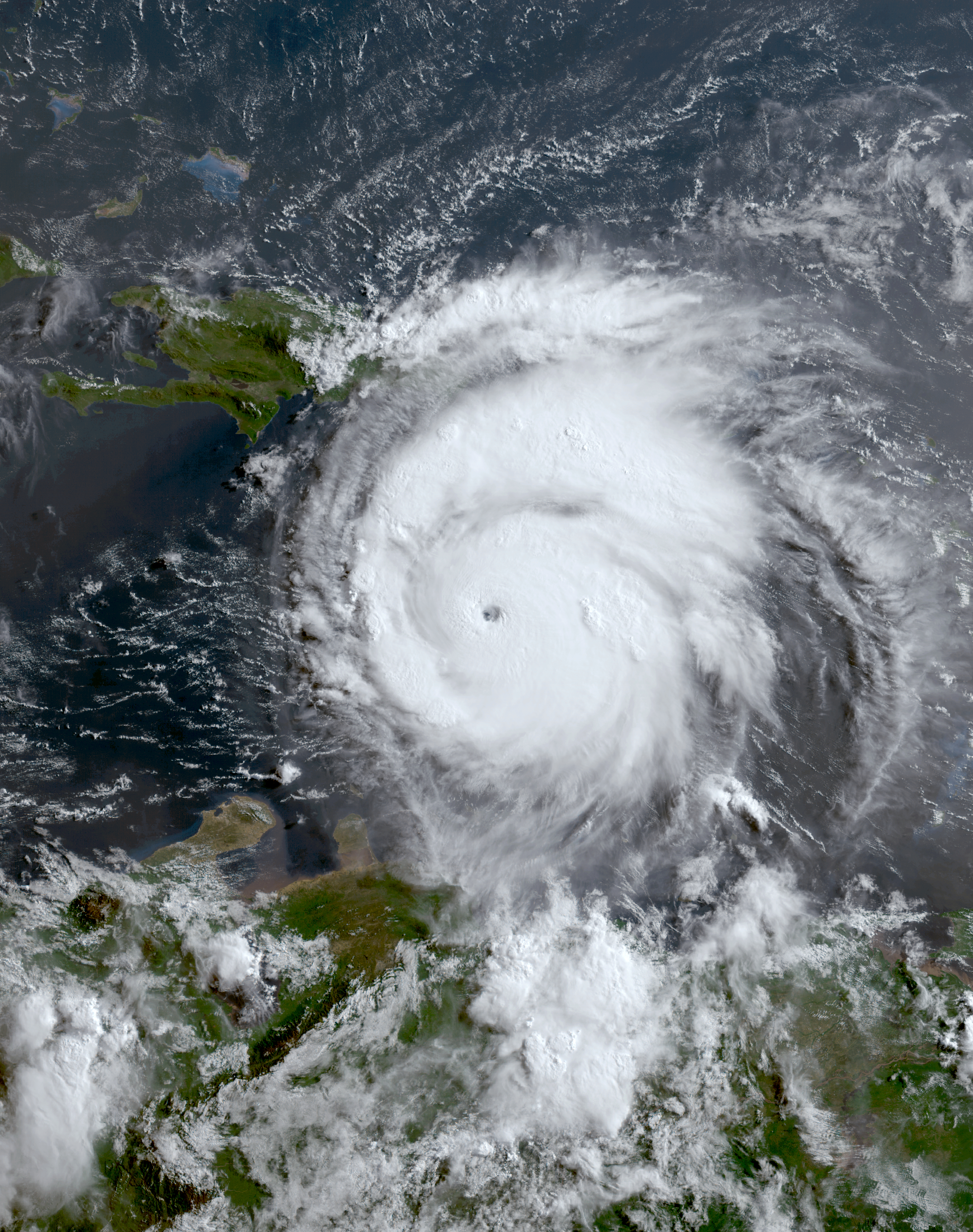
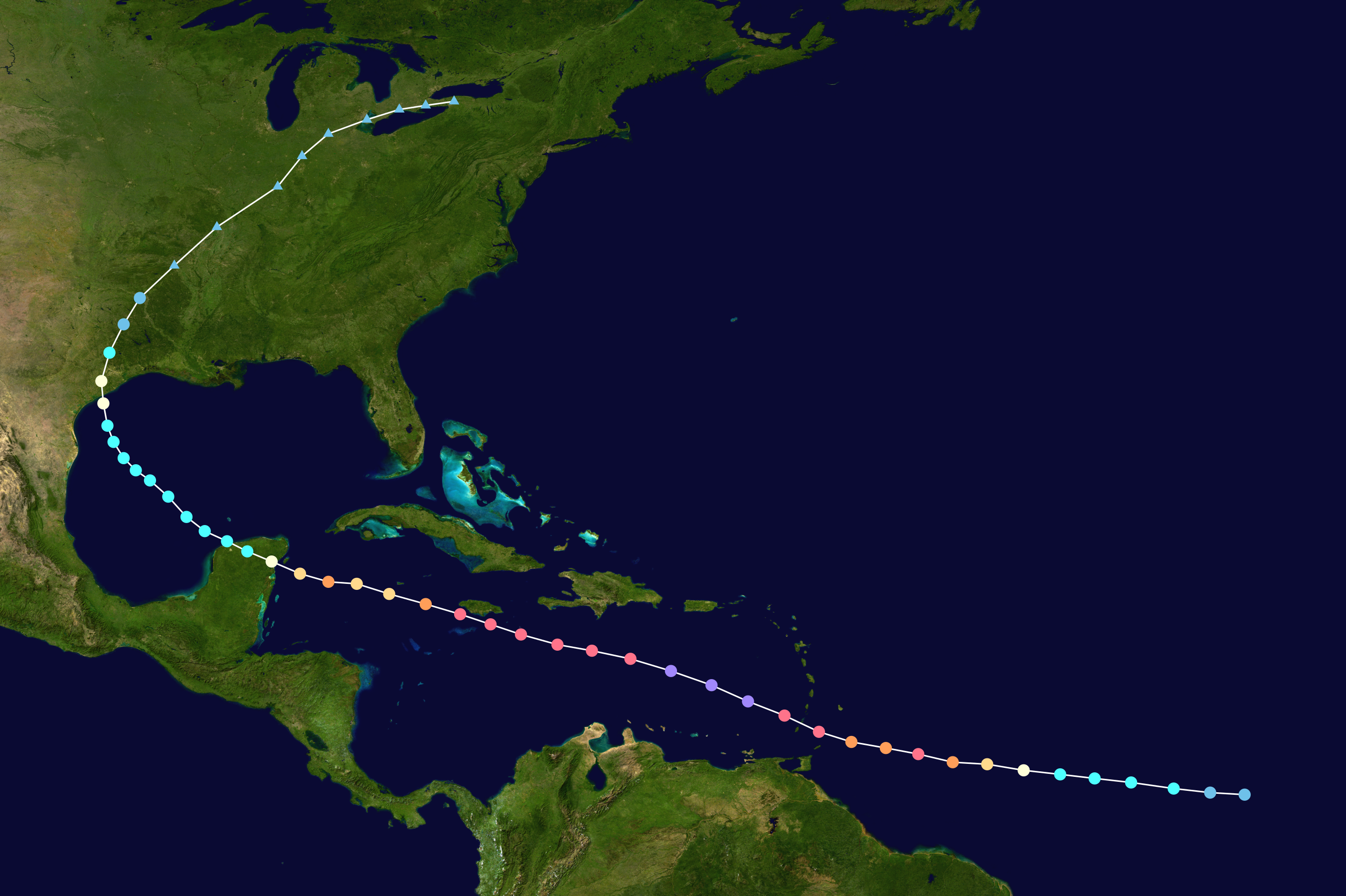
- Duration: June 28 – July 9
- Peak intensity: 165 mph (270 km/h) (1-min); 932 mbar (hPa)

A tropical wave developed into a tropical depression at 12:00 UTC on June 28 about 1,380 mi (2,220 km) east of Barbados. A strong subtropical ridge caused the depression to move generally west-northwestward through an unusually favorable environment for the time of year with warm sea surface temperatures (SST) and minimal wind shear, resulting in rapid intensification. The depression strengthened into Tropical Storm Beryl by 00:00 UTC on June 29 and then into a hurricane about 24 hours thereafter. Beryl intensified into a Category 3 major hurricane around 12:00 UTC on June 30 and a Category 4 hurricane six hours later. An eyewall replacement cycle then weakened Beryl to a Category 3 hurricane early on July 1, but it regained Category 4 strength six hours later once the cycle was completed. At 15:10 UTC the same day, Beryl made landfall in Carriacou, Grenada, with winds of 140 mph (220 km/h). After entering the Caribbean, the hurricane further intensified into a Category 5 hurricane early on July 2 and soon peaked with winds of 165 mph (270 km/h) and a minimum pressure of 932 mbar (27.5 inHg), recorded by a dropsonde.

Increasing wind shear led Beryl to begin weakening later on July 2 as it passed well south of Hispaniola, falling to Category 4 intensity. Beryl passed near southern Jamaica late on July 3 and early on July 4. Around 12:00 UTC on the latter date, the cyclone weakened to a Category 2 hurricane southeast of the Cayman Islands. Beryl briefly regained major hurricane status early on July 5 but quickly weakened back. At 11:00 UTC, the storm struck Mexico near Tulum, Quintana Roo, as a Category 1 hurricane with winds of 90 mph (150 km/h). Beryl fell to tropical storm status before reaching the Gulf of Mexico later on July 5. Turning north-northwestward on July 7 due to a mid-latitude trough, the cyclone re-intensified as wind shear decreased and moisture increased. Early on July 8, Beryl became a Category 1 hurricane before striking near Matagorda, Texas, at 08:40 UTC with winds of 90 mph (150 km/h). While crossing Greater Houston, Beryl weakened to a tropical storm at 18:00 UTC and turned northeastward. Around 00:00 UTC on July 9, the cyclone weakened to a tropical depression, about 12 hours before becoming extratropical over Arkansas. The extratropical remnants crossed the Midwestern United States and southern Ontario before being absorbed near Buffalo, New York, by a frontal system on July 11.

Beryl caused catastrophic impacts on Grenada's northern islands of Carriacou and Petite Martinique, damaging or destroying 99% of buildings on the former and 70% on the latter. Several of Saint Vincent and the Grenadines' southern islands, such as Canouan, Mayreau, and Union Island, had 80%-90% of dwellings damaged to some degree. On Barbados, Beryl damaged more than 200 boats and about 40 homes. Floodwaters more than 6,000 homes in the Venezuelan state of Sucre after the Manzanares River overflowed. Landslides and rough seas destroyed some structures in the Dominican Republic, while the hurricane damaged crops, dwellings, and infrastructure on Jamaica. Sustained damage was also recorded in Mexico's Yucatán Peninsula as well, although it was generally limited to downed trees and power lines and damaged roofs; there was also widespread flooding. In the United States, the state of Texas experienced severe flooding and wind damage, while about 2.7 million people lost electricity. Additionally, the hurricane and its remnants produced a prolific tornado outbreak, with 68 tornadoes confirmed in the United States and 2 in Ontario. Overall, Beryl caused 73 deaths, including 48 in the United States, 8 in Saint Vincent and the Grenadines, 6 each in Grenada and Venezuela, 4 in Jamaica, and 1 in Canada. Additionally, Beryl inflicted at least $9.05 billion in damage, with $7.2 billion in the United States, $995 million in Jamaica, $231 million in Saint Vincent and the Grenadines, about $430 million in Grenada, $96.5 million in Barbados, $90 million in Mexico, $2.1 million in the Cayman Islands, and $2 million in Saint Lucia.

=== Tropical Storm Chris ===
- Tropical storm (SSHWS)
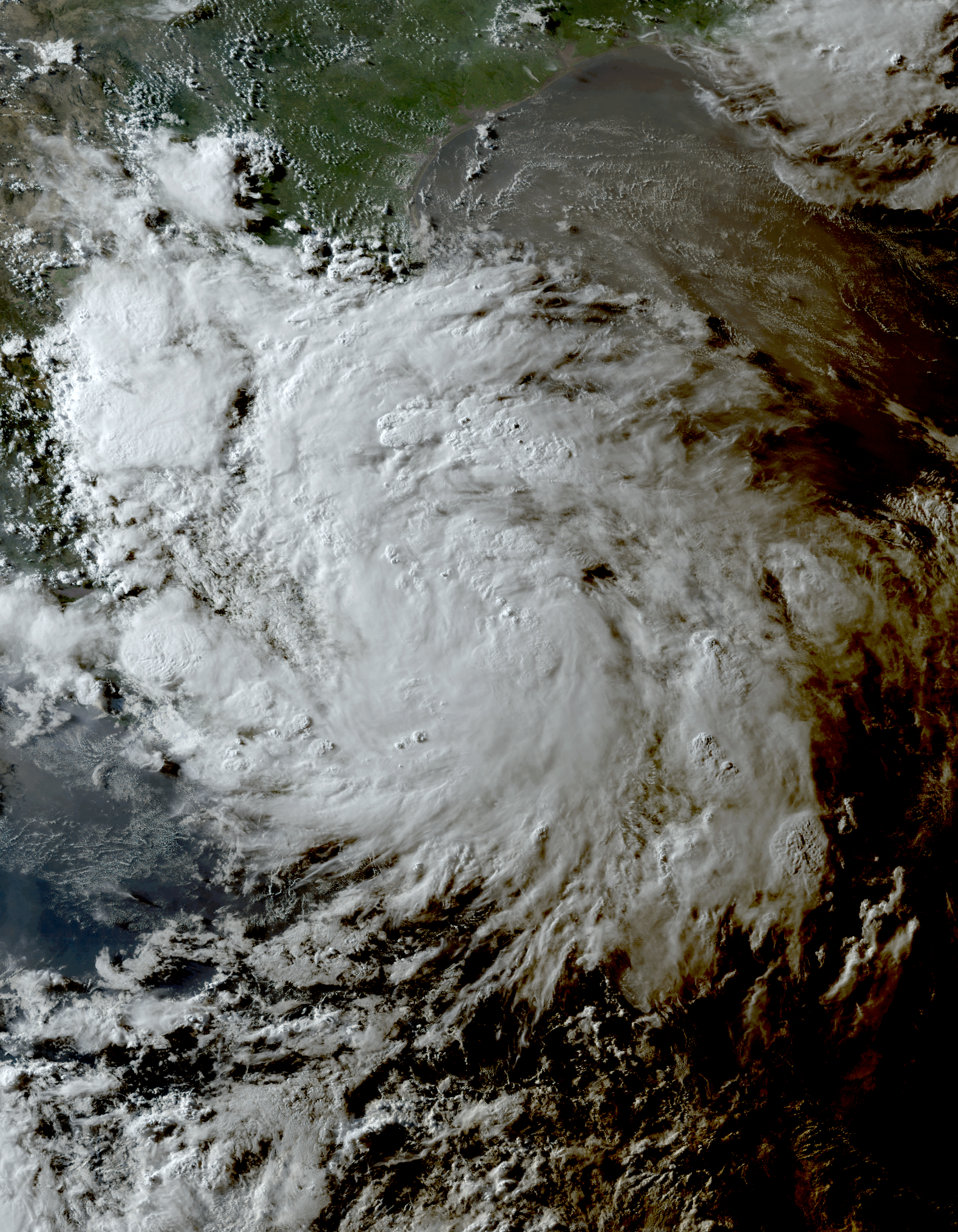
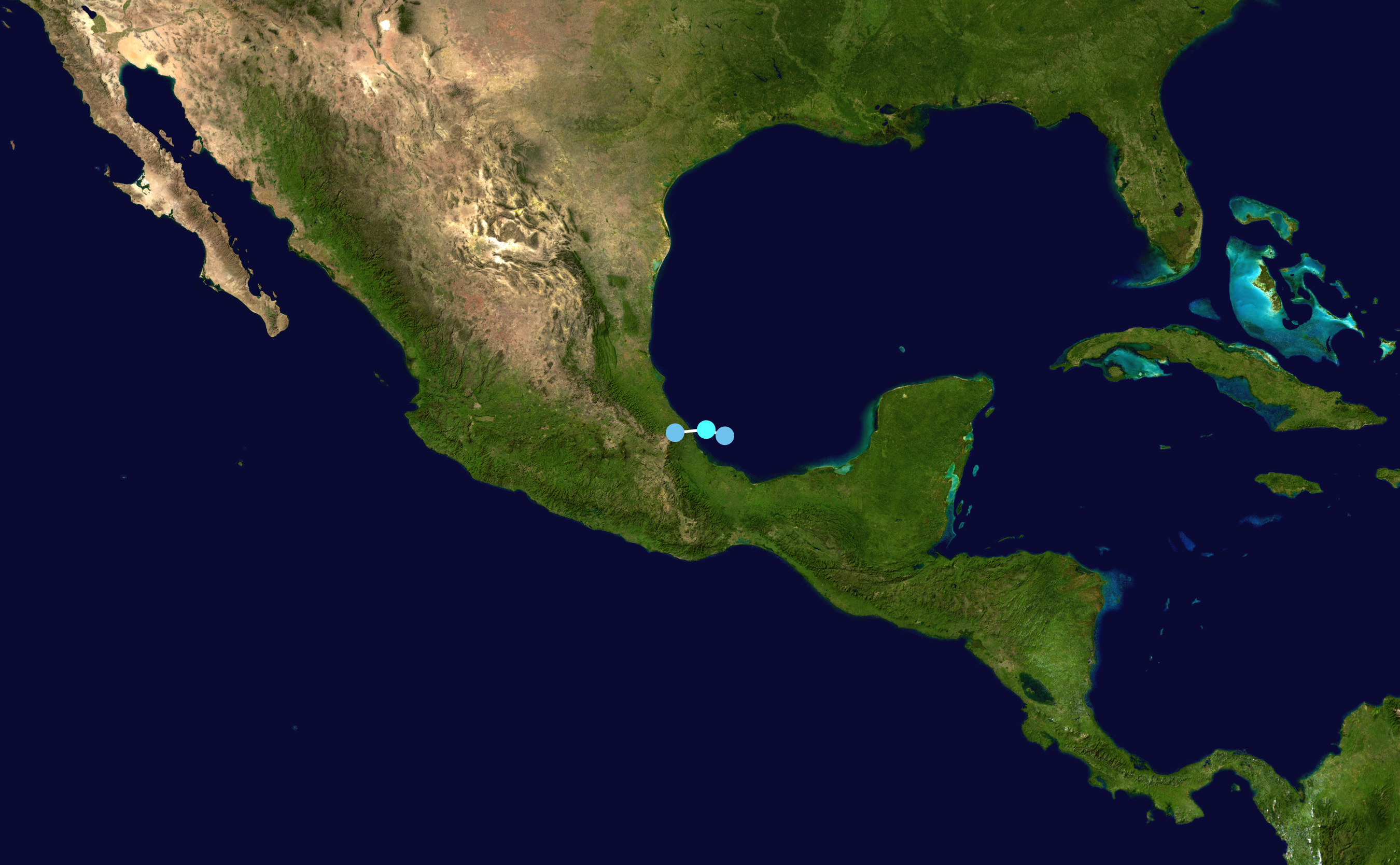
- Duration: June 30 – July 1
- Peak intensity: 45 mph (75 km/h) (1-min); 1005 mbar (hPa)

A tropical wave emerged into the Atlantic from Africa's west coast on June 20. Moving generally westward for several days, the wave crossed the Windward Islands on June 25 and then traversed the Caribbean through June 28. By then, the wave slowed and an area of low pressure had developed, one day before striking the Yucatán Peninsula. After entering the Bay of Campeche on June 30, the low organized into a tropical depression around 18:00 UTC about 65 mi (105 km) northeast of Veracruz, Veracruz. Warm seas allowed the depression to intensify into Tropical Storm Chris at 00:00 UTC on July 1. However, just three hours later, Chris made landfall in Alto Lucero, Veracruz, with winds of 45 mph (75 km/h) and a minimum pressure of 1,005 mbar (29.7 inHg). The cyclone rapidly weakened and dissipated late on July 1.

Chris generated heavy rains in the states of Chiapas, Hidalgo, Morelos, San Luis Potosí, and Veracruz, causing flooding, overflowing rivers, and mudslides. Consequently, local authorities in Veracruz closed schools in 41 municipalities and opened 9 temporary shelters, which housed 86 people. Flooding also damaged numerous homes, including almost 2,000 in Huiloapan alone. In Hidalgo, flooding forced the evacuation of around 200 families in Yahualica. More than 20,000 people were affected by flooding in Xochiatipan, which inundated homes and a clinic. An elderly man in Tlanchinol, Hidalgo, was killed after being buried by a mudslide, while four police officers in Tepetlán, Veracruz, were killed after being swept away by an overflowing stream while surveying storm damage. The state governments of Veracruz and Tamaulipas spent Mex$143.987 million (US$7.06 million) and Mex$800 million - 1 billion (US$39.2 - 48.9 million), respectively, on repairing the damage caused by Chris.

=== Hurricane Debby ===
- Category 1 hurricane (SSHWS)
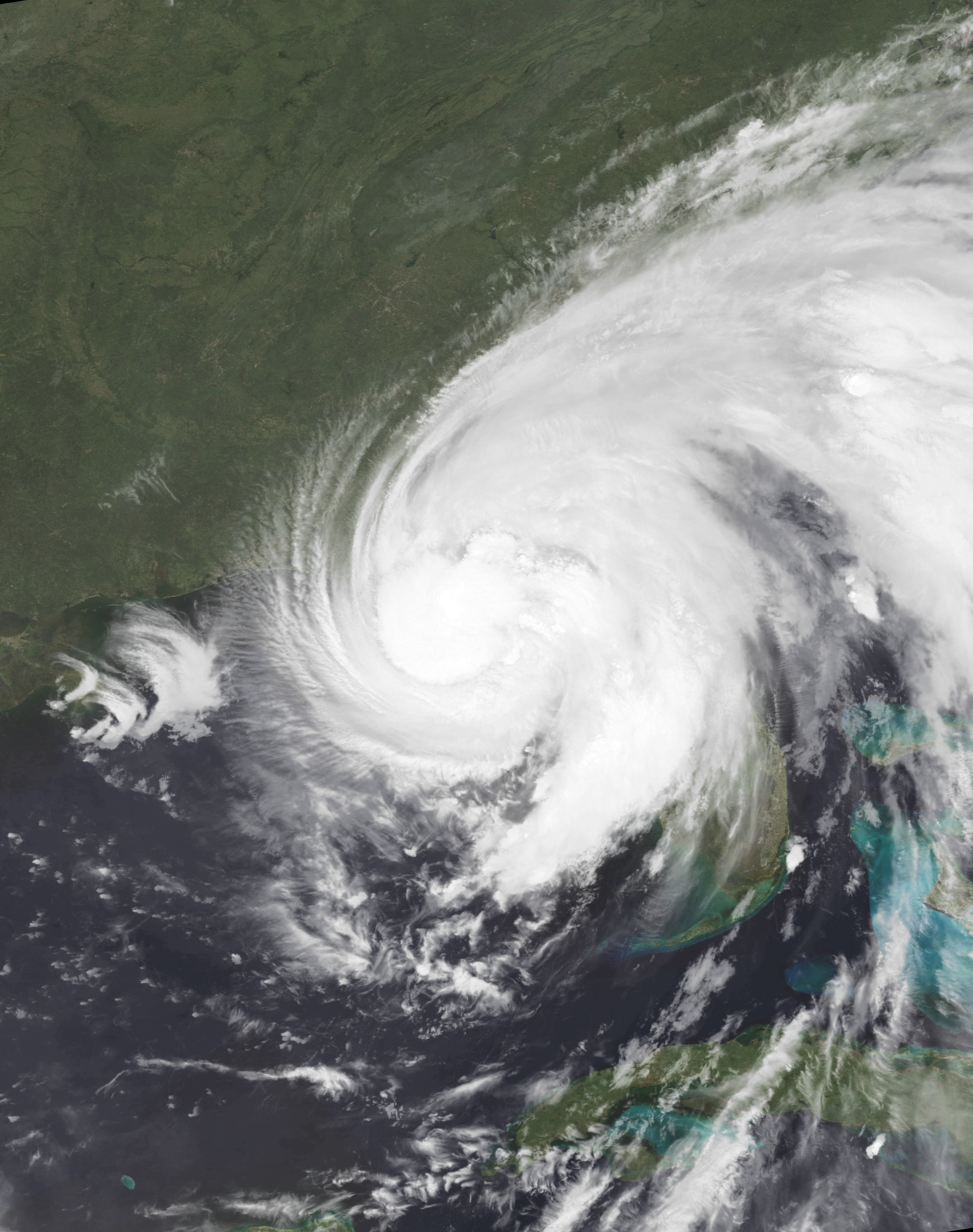
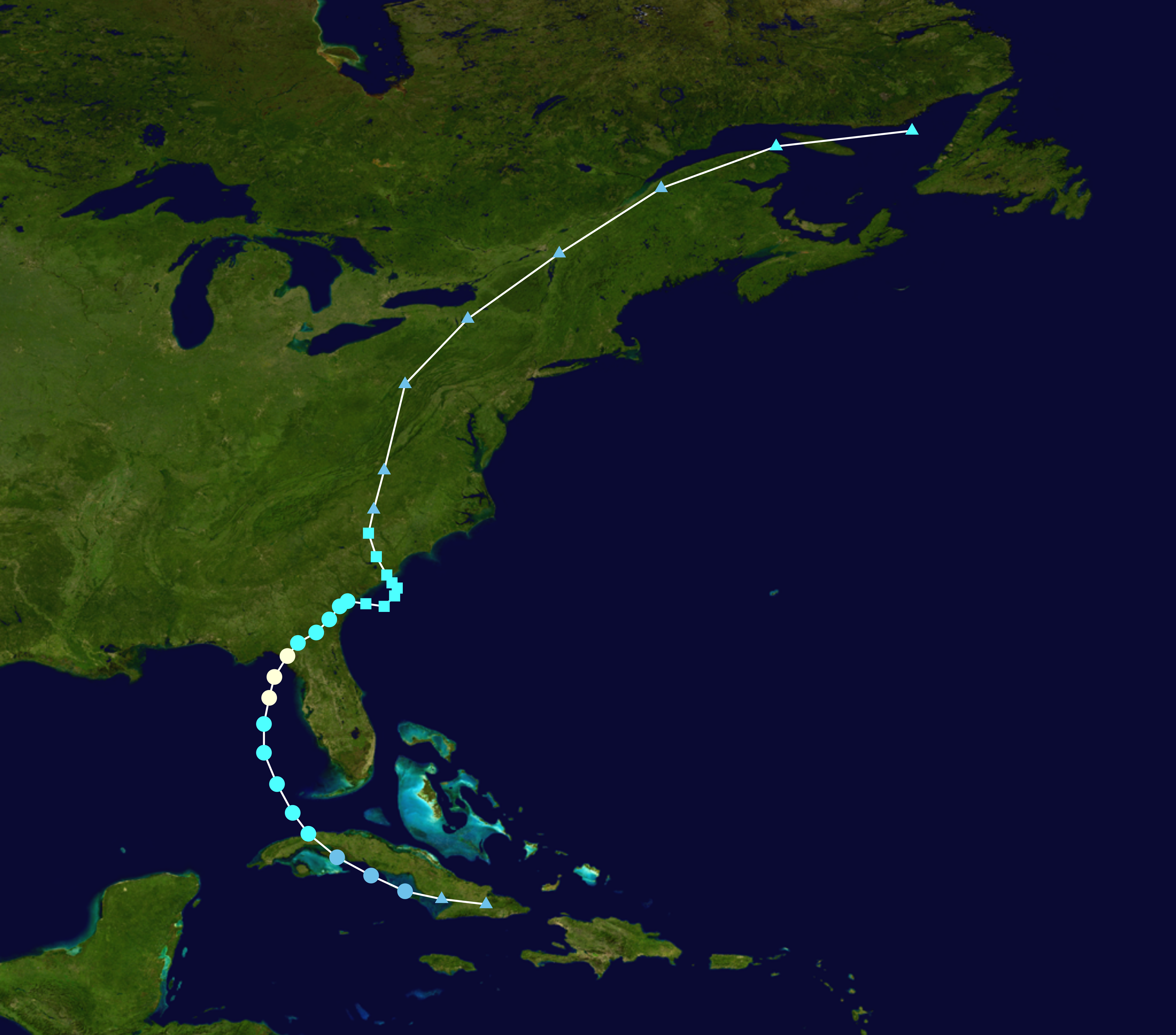
- Duration: August 3 – August 8
- Peak intensity: 80 mph (130 km/h) (1-min); 979 mbar (hPa)

A tropical wave that exited the west coast of Africa between July 25 and July 26 developed into a tropical depression early on August 3 over the Caribbean near Cuba, about 60 mi (95 km) west of Santa Cruz del Sur, Camagüey Province. Striking Ciénaga de Zapata in Matanzas Province several hours later, the system strengthened into Tropical Storm Debby that day after emerging into the Straits of Florida near Havana. Moving northwestward and then northward due to a western Atlantic subtropical ridge, Debby strengthened into a hurricane early on August 5. Around 11:00 UTC, the cyclone struck near Steinhatchee, Florida, with winds of 80 mph (130 km/h) and a minimum pressure of 979 mbar (28.9 inHg). Debby quickly weakened to a tropical storm and turned northeastward. Upon reaching the Atlantic early on August 7, Debby transitioned into a subtropical storm. After meandering slowly southeastward and then northwestward, the system struck Bulls Bay, South Carolina, with winds of 45 mph (75 km/h). Late on August 8, Debby became extratropical while merging with a front over North Carolina. The remnant low crossed the Eastern United States and parts of Atlantic Canada before being absorbed over the Gulf of St. Lawrence by another frontal system associated with a new area of low pressure.

Debby and its precursor produced heavy rains across the Caribbean, especially Cuba and Puerto Rico. As the storm moved slowly around Florida, precipitation peaked around 20 in (510 mm) near Sarasota. Flooding occurred across the state's west coast and north-central interior, including more than 1,000 structures suffering damage in Sarasota County and another 160 receiving major impacts in Manatee County. Winds in north-central Florida downed many trees, some of which struck cars and homes. Parts of some states as far north as Vermont reported flooding and isolated wind damage, with a peak total of 22.02 in (559 mm) of precipitation near Moncks Corner, South Carolina. Approximately 520,000 customers lost electricity in North Carolina alone. Rain also severely impacted Quebec, with Debby causing the heaviest one-day rain in the 380-year history of Montreal and becoming the most costly climate event in Quebec history. Overall, 18 fatalities and about $4.25 billion in damage occurred throughout the United States and Canada.

=== Hurricane Ernesto ===
- Category 2 hurricane (SSHWS)
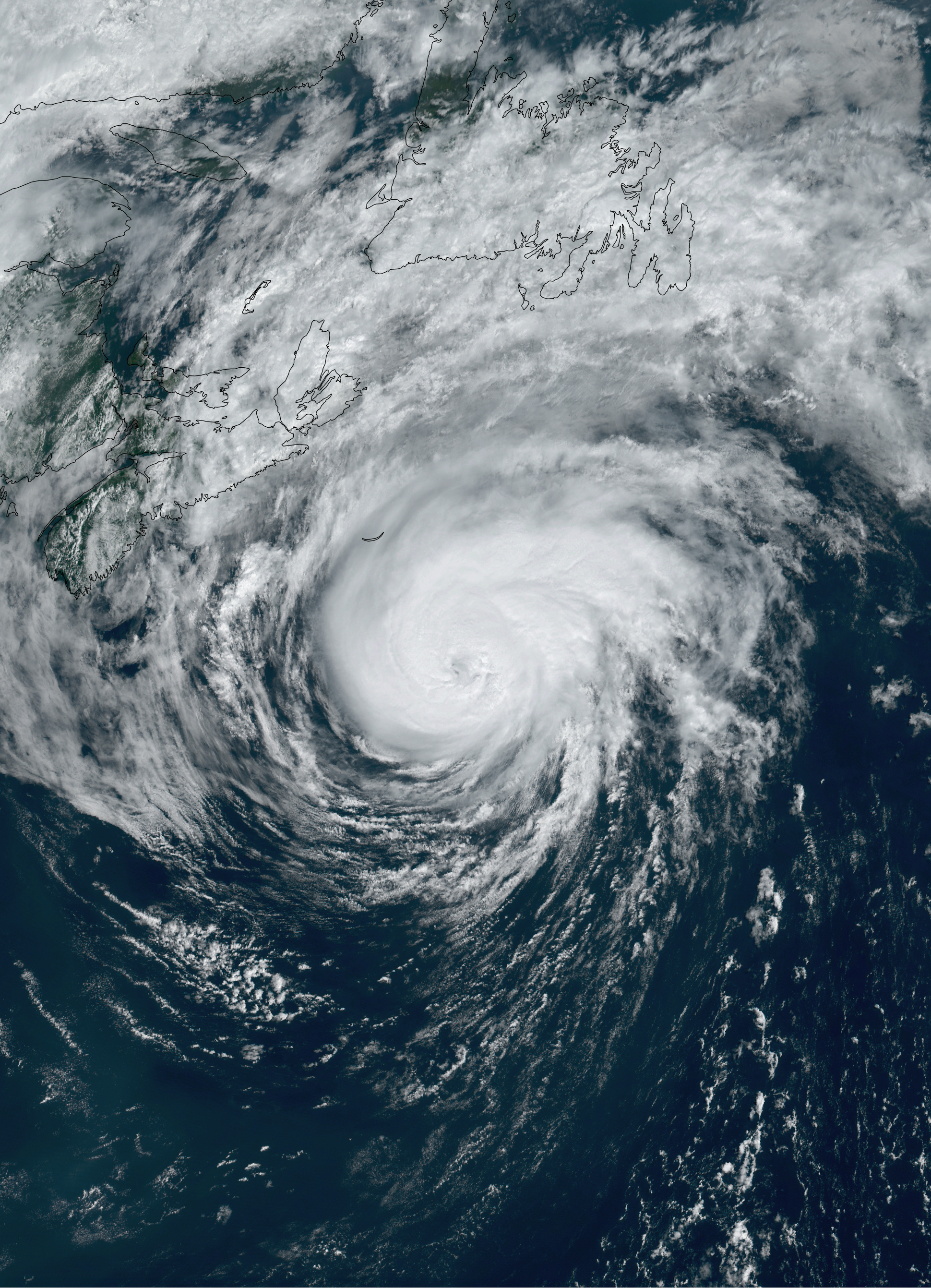
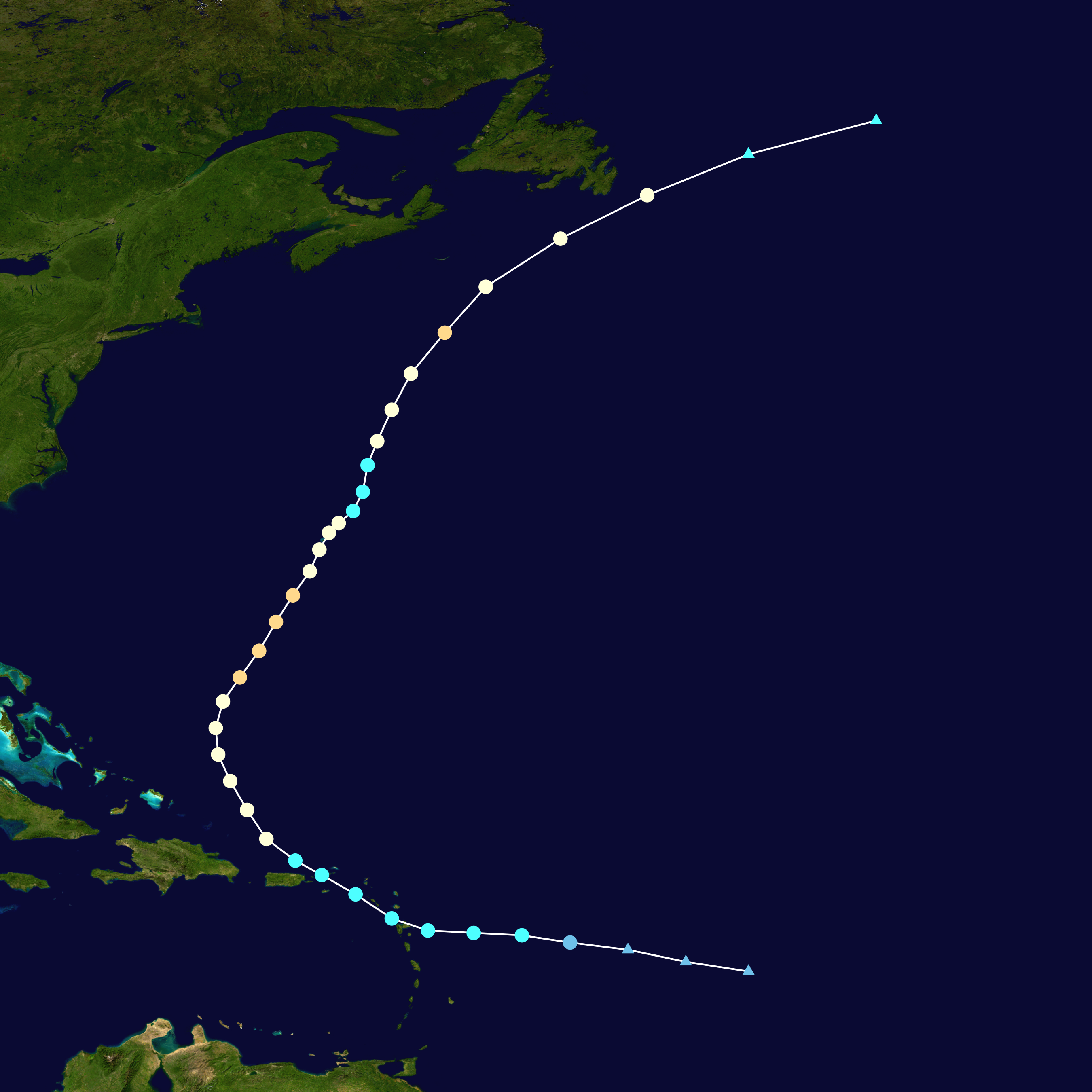
- Duration: August 12 – August 20
- Peak intensity: 100 mph (155 km/h) (1-min); 967 mbar (hPa)

On August 7, a tropical wave emerged into the Atlantic from the west coast of Africa. The wave gradually acquired more convection and organized as it moved generally westward over the next several days, developing into a tropical depression roughly 450 mi (725 km) east of Guadeloupe at 12:00 UTC on August 12. The depression continued moving westward due to a large subtropical ridge and intensified into Tropical Storm Ernesto within six hours. Ernesto turned northwestward on August 13 and struck Guadeloupe, Montserrat, and Saint John that day while strengthening under favorable conditions. After passing northeast of Puerto Rico on the next day, Ernesto became a hurricane, although the storm initially struggled to intensify much further due to dry air. A weakness in the subtropical ridge caused the cyclone to turn northward and then northeastward. Early on August 16, Ernesto intensified into a Category 2 hurricane and peaked with winds of 100 mph (155 km/h) and a minimum pressure of 967 mbar (28.6 inHg). However, increasing wind shear weakened Ernesto to a Category 1 hurricane on August 17, before striking Bermuda at 08:30 UTC. The system weakened further to a tropical storm early on the following day but restrengthened into a Category 1 hurricane several hours later. Ernesto briefly re-intensified into a Category 2 hurricane on August 19. Accelerating northeastward, Ernesto transitioned into an extratropical cyclone at 12:00 UTC on August 20 about 260 mi (420 km) east-northeast of St. John's, Newfoundland, several hours before opening into a trough.

Several main roads on the island of Guadeloupe were closed due to the storm. More than 45,000 customers lost power in the Virgin Islands as a result of hurricane-force wind gusts, including all of Saint Croix and Saint Thomas. Over 728,000 households in Puerto Rico lost power, around half of the island. An additional 235,000 households suffered water outages. Wind gusts on the island of Culebra reached 86 mph (138 km/h), where downed trees blocked roads and roofs were blown off. In Bermuda, power outages were recorded as well. Large swells and rip currents generated by Ernesto along the East Coast of the United States caused three deaths, two in South Carolina and one in North Carolina. Waves also swept away one home on Hatteras Island in the latter. Swells predicted to reach 6 ft (1.8 m) in New York City led Mayor Eric Adams to order all beaches in Brooklyn and Queens to close. According to Aon, total damages were estimated to be at $520 million. In Ireland, the remnants of Ernesto, combined with a supermoon event, led to flooding on roads and wharfs along waterways in Galway.

=== Hurricane Francine ===
- Category 2 hurricane (SSHWS)
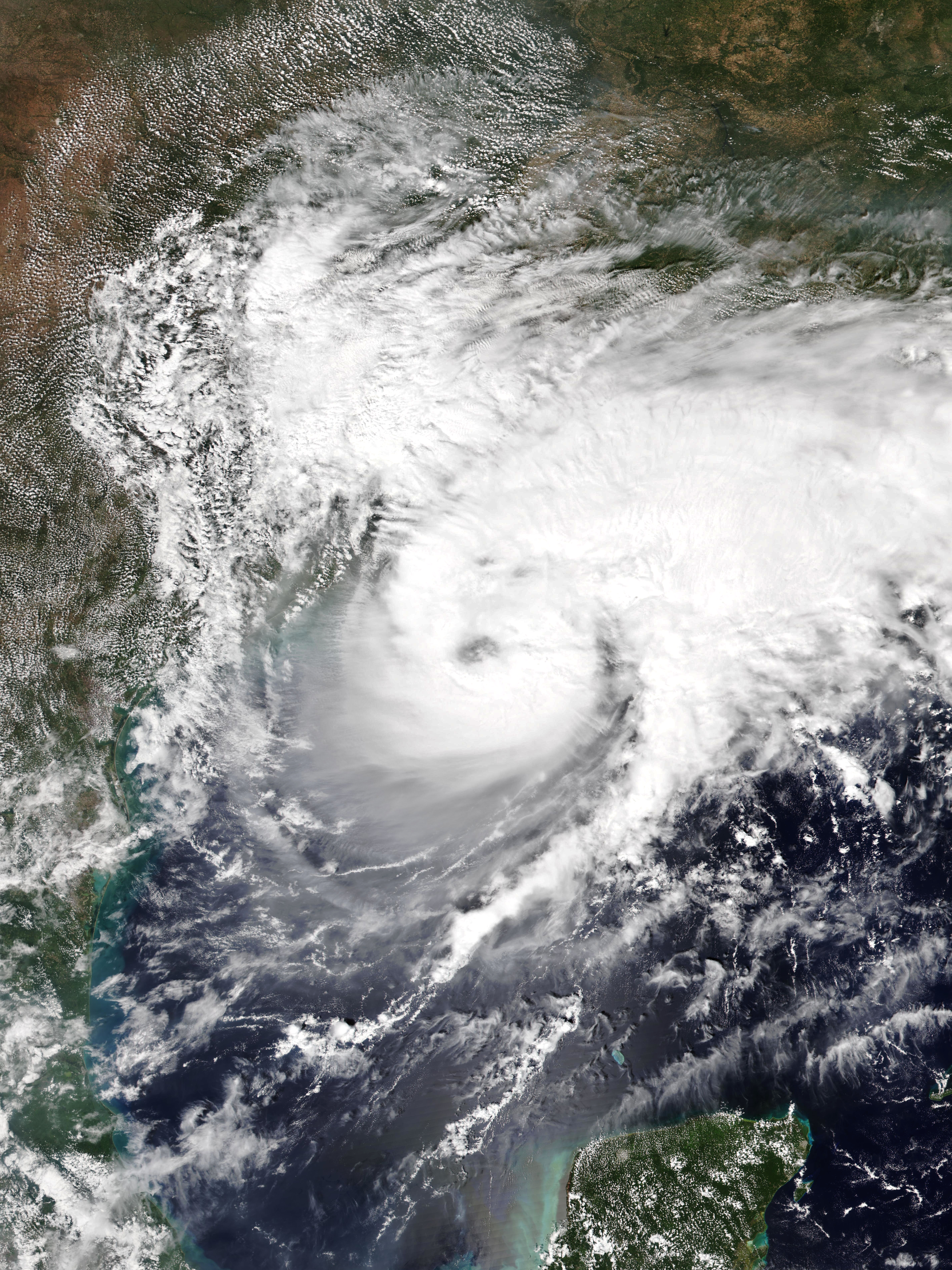
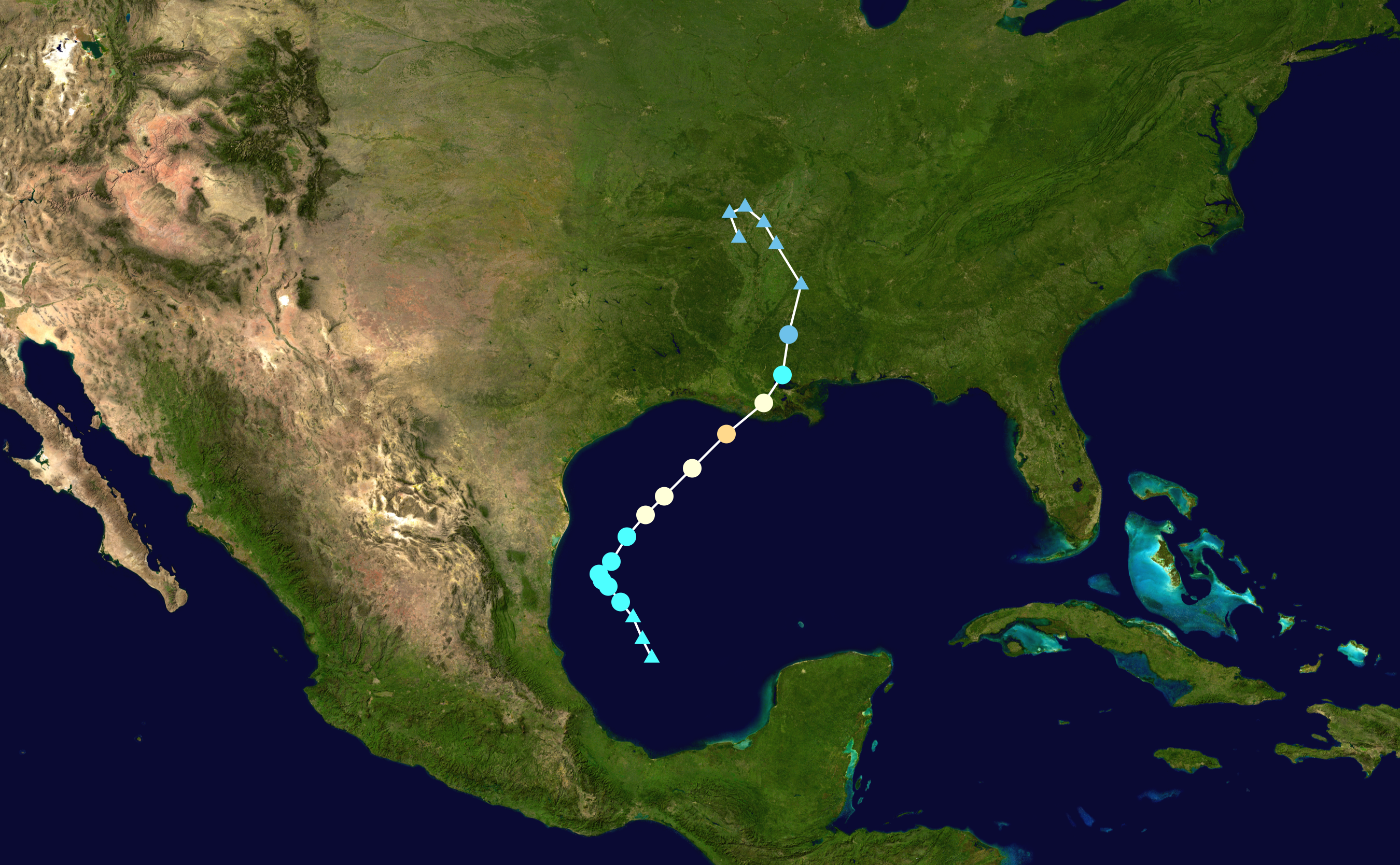
- Duration: September 9 – September 12
- Peak intensity: 105 mph (165 km/h) (1-min); 972 mbar (hPa)

Between August 25 and August 26, a tropical wave emerged into the Atlantic from the west coast of Africa. After crossing the Atlantic and Caribbean for more than a week, deep convection began increasing on September 5 as the wave moved over the Yucatán Peninsula. Emerging into the Bay of Campeche on September 7, the wave interacted with a frontal system and non-tropical low, leading to the formation of a separate low, which developed into Tropical Storm Francine on September 9 about 160 mi (255 km) northeast of Tampico, Tamaulipas. Higher wind gusts in the system were enhanced by a barrier jet near the Sierra Madre Oriental. Francine initially moved northwestward due to a mid-level ridge over Florida but turned northeastward on September 10 as a short-wave trough crossed the Southeastern United States. The storm strengthened into a hurricane early on September 11. Significant intensification ensued despite increasing wind shear, with Francine peaking as a Category 2 hurricane with winds of 105 mph (165 km/h) and a minimum pressure of 972 mbar (28.7 inHg) as it struck Terrebonne Parish, Louisiana, at 22:00 UTC. Rapid weakening then commenced, and at 06:00 UTC on September 12, Francine weakened into a tropical storm and then a tropical depression at 12:00 UTC, six hours before becoming extratropical over Mississippi. The extratropical low dissipated over Arkansas on September 14.

Heavy precipitation fell in northeastern Mexico, causing flooding in Matamoros area neighborhoods. Oil and natural gas production in the Gulf of Mexico was also disrupted. South Texas reported heavy rainfall, including 7.44 in (189 mm) in Brownsville, leaving the roads to SpaceX Starbase impassable and flooding parts of the facility itself. Approximately 500,000 people lost electricity in Louisiana, Mississippi, and Alabama combined, with Francine downing numerous power lines and trees in those three states, blocking many roads. In Louisiana, flooding, high winds, and falling trees damaged hundreds of structures in Jefferson and St. Charles parishes. Precipitation from the cyclone peaked at 14.61 in (371 mm) near Navarre, Florida. The National Centers for Environmental Information estimated that Francine caused about $1.3 billion in damage.

=== Tropical Storm Gordon ===
- Tropical storm (SSHWS)
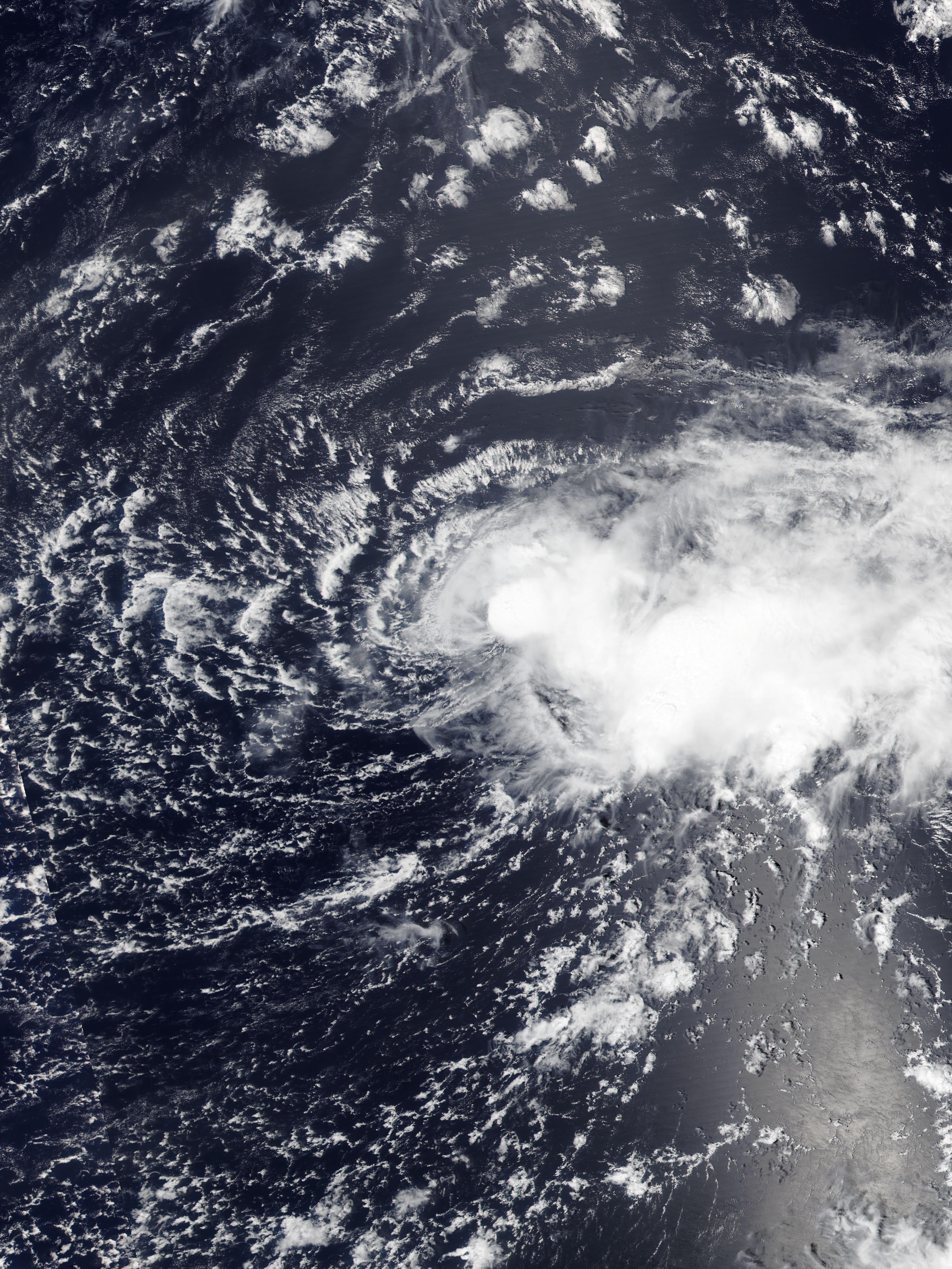
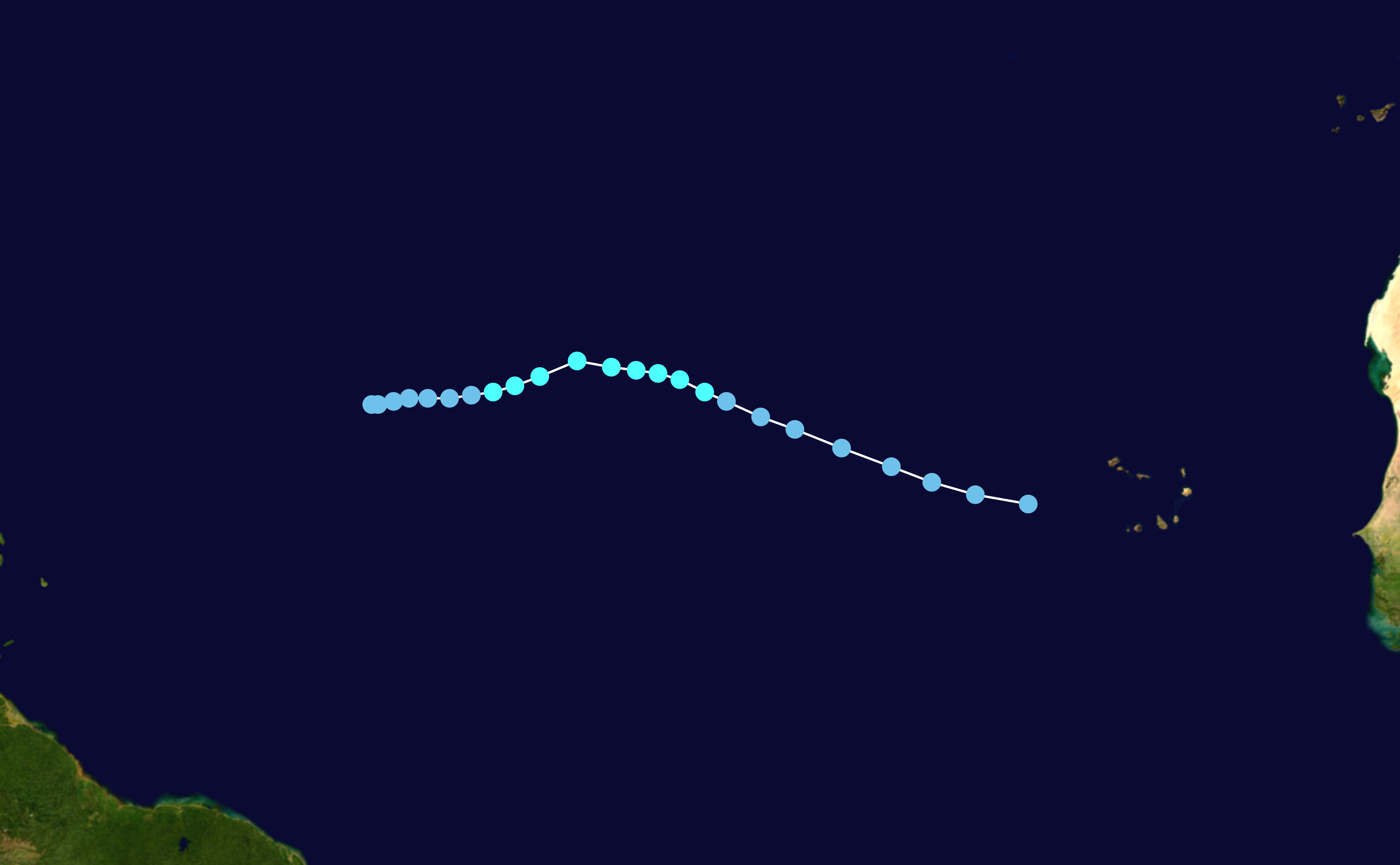
- Duration: September 11 – September 17
- Peak intensity: 45 mph (75 km/h) (1-min); 1004 mbar (hPa)

A tropical wave emerged into the Atlantic from the west coast of Africa on September 9. Heavy rains and gusty winds impacted the Cabo Verde Islands as the wave passed through on the next day. Being in a favorable environment for development, showers and thunderstorms quickly began showing signs of organization in the disturbance, with a tropical depression developing around 12:00 UTC on September 11 approximately 230 mi (370 km) west of the islands. Further intensification occurred slowly, with the depression not becoming Tropical Storm Gordon until about 48 hours later. The center of the system remained to the west of its deep convection, and persistent wind shear prevented Gordon from significantly strengthening. Early on September 14, Gordon peaked with winds of 45 mph (75 km/h) and a minimum pressure of 1,004 mbar (29.6 inHg). Gordon weakened back to a tropical depression late on September 15 and dissipated on September 17 about 840 mi (1,350 km) east of the Leeward Islands. The NHC continued to monitor the system for potential redevelopment until September 21, though strong wind shear kept any convection away from the center of circulation.

=== Hurricane Helene ===
- Category 4 hurricane (SSHWS)
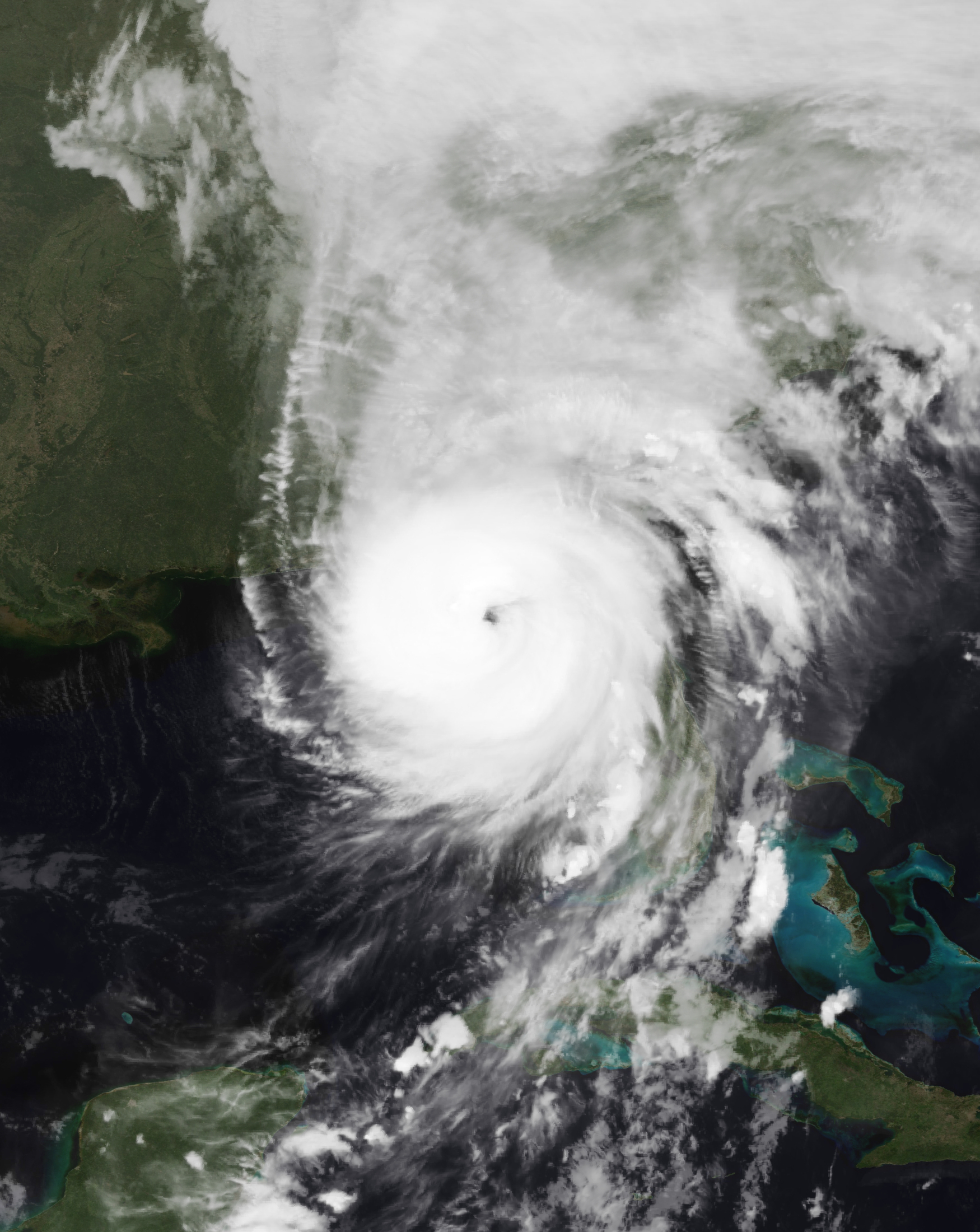
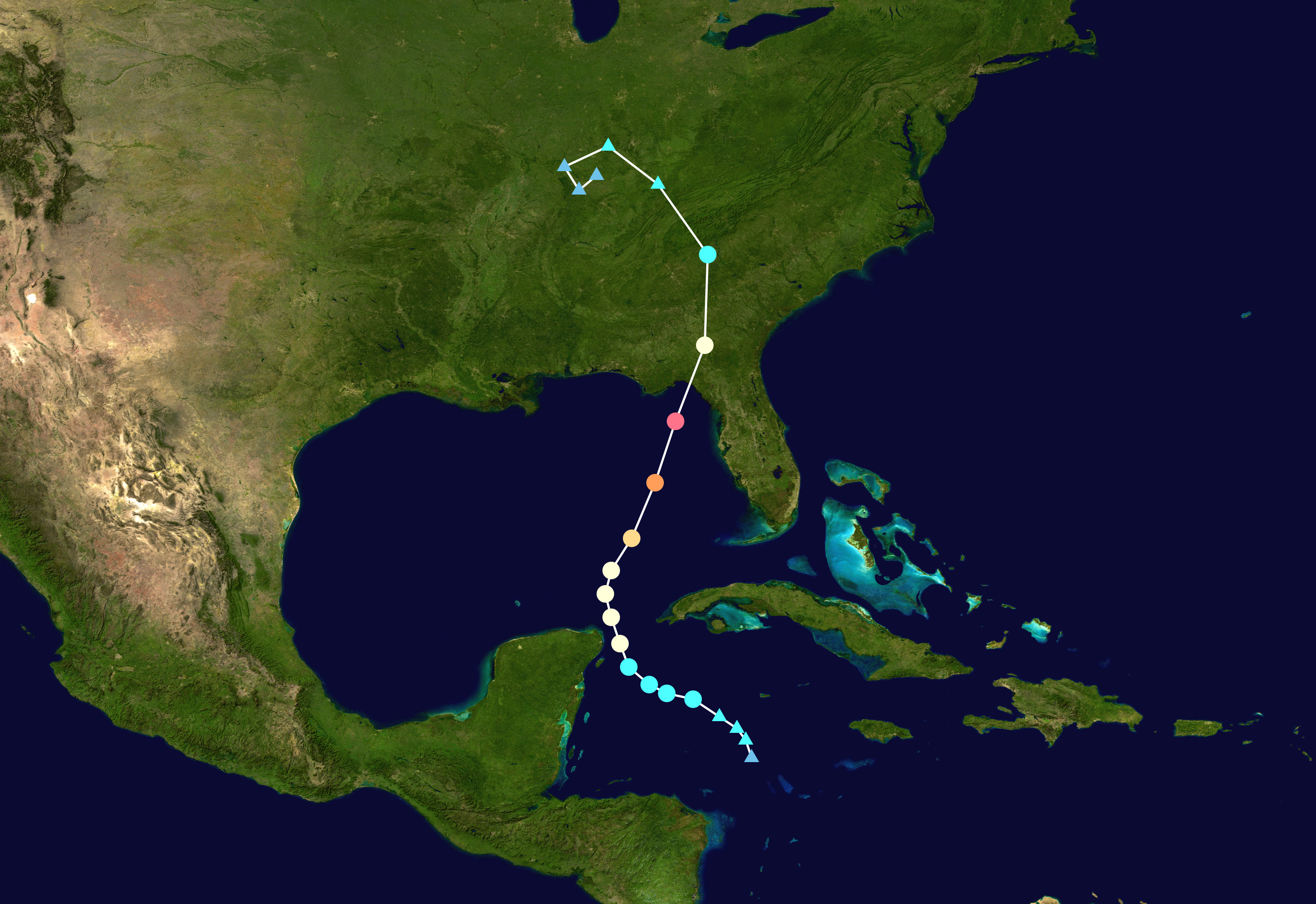
- Duration: September 24 – September 27
- Peak intensity: 140 mph (220 km/h) (1-min); 939 mbar (hPa)

A Central American gyre developed on September 20 over Central America and gradually organized, acquiring more deep convection over the next few days while traversing an environment conducive for development. By 12:00 UTC on September 24, the disturbance became Tropical Storm Helene roughly 200 mi (320 km) south of Cape San Antonio, Cuba. Continuously favorable conditions allowed the storm to intensify into a hurricane about 24 hours later as it moved northwestward and passed just offshore the Yucatán Peninsula. Helene then accelerated northeastward across the Gulf of Mexico due to a ridge and a deep-layer cut-off low-pressure area situated over the Tennessee Valley while expanding significantly and reaching major hurricane status late on September 26. At 03:10 UTC on the following day, Helene peaked as a Category 4 hurricane with maximum sustained winds of 140 mph (220 km/h) and a minimum pressure of 939 mbar (27.7 inHg) as it struck Florida just east of the mouth of the Aucilla River, based on data from a Texas Tech StickNet observation site located about halfway between the landfall point and Perry. Thus, the cyclone became the most intense to make landfall in the Big Bend region of Florida since reliable records began. Helene quickly weakened as it moved quickly inland before degenerating into a post-tropical cyclone over Kentucky while merging with a cut-off low on September 27. The system then stalled over the state before dissipating on September 29.

Helene's precursor and early stages caused flooding in Nicaragua, Honduras, the Cayman Islands, and the Yucatán Peninsula, where high winds left more than 120,000 customers without electricity in Quintana Roo. Storm surge in Florida caused significant damage from the Tampa Bay area northward. Hillsborough and Pinellas counties combined reported the destruction of at least 419 residences, major damage to at least 18,512 structures, and minor to moderate damage to 13,909 others. Several counties in or near the Big Bend suffered extensive wind impacts. Heavy crop and timber losses occurred over southern Georgia, totaling about $5.5 billion. Tens of thousands of homes and buildings suffered wind damage as far north as the Augusta area, while floodwaters entered at least 200 structures and a number of vehicles in the Atlanta area. Catastrophic flooding and more than 2,000 landslides occurred over the southern Appalachian Mountains, especially North Carolina, due to rainfall totals up to 30.78 in (782 mm) in Busick, North Carolina. In North Carolina, over 125,000 housing units and approximately 822,000 acres (333,000 ha) of timberland suffered some degree of damage. Thousands of miles of bridges and roads were damaged by floodwaters. At least 106 fatalities occurred in North Carolina, far more than any other state. Helene and its remnants also spawned thirty-nine tornadoes across the United States, one of which killed two people in Wheeler County, Georgia. Flooding also impacted Virginia, West Virginia, and Ohio, leaving 12 homes destroyed and 104 others damaged in Pulaski County, Virginia, alone. More than 7.4 million customers lost electricity across the United States. At least 252 deaths and $78.7 billion in damages have been attributed to Helene, making it the second-deadliest hurricane to strike the continental United States in fifty years, after Katrina in 2005, and the deadliest overall since Maria in 2017, as well as being the seventh costliest hurricane in the United States.

=== Hurricane Isaac ===
- Category 2 hurricane (SSHWS)
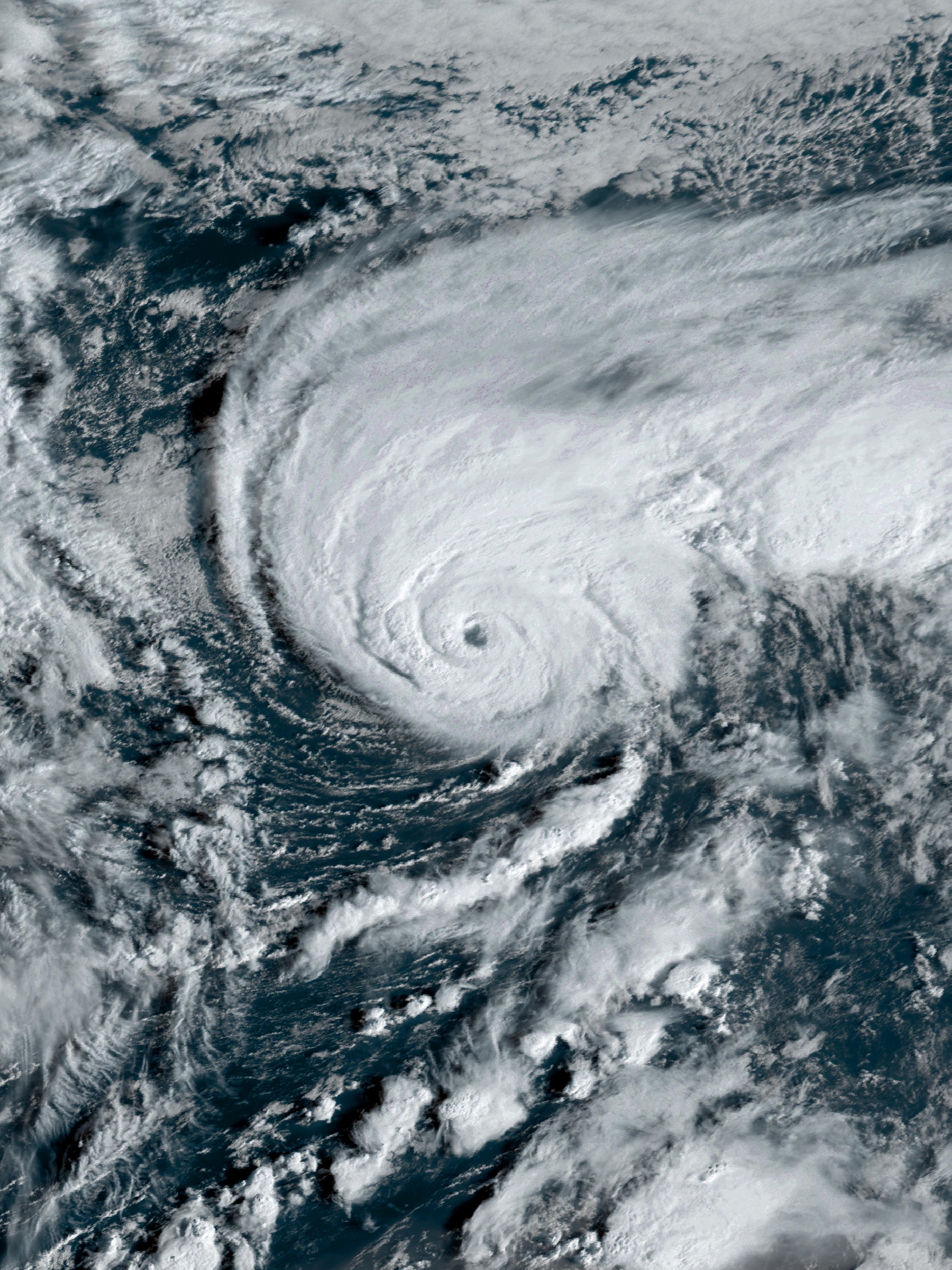
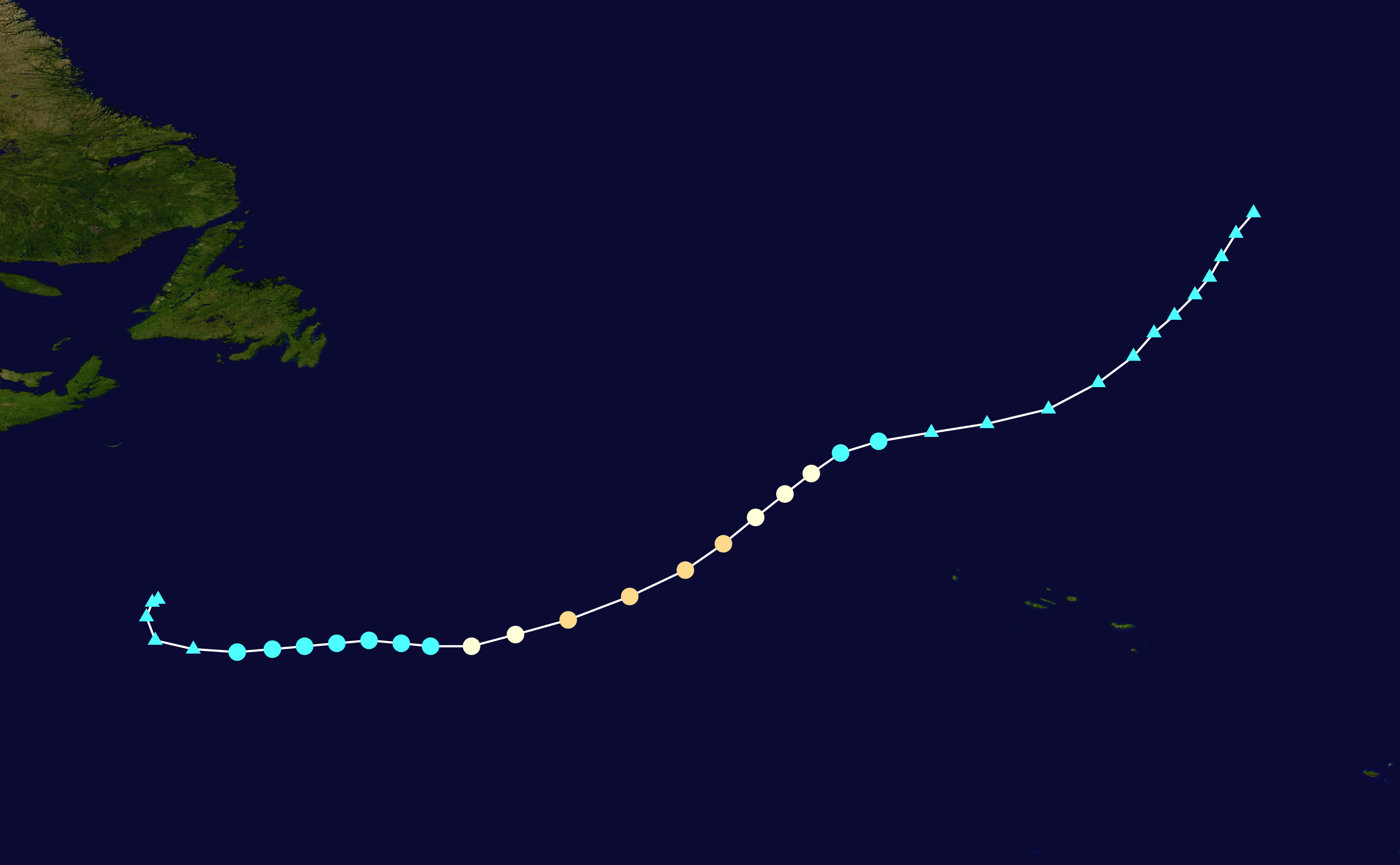
- Duration: September 25 – September 30
- Peak intensity: 105 mph (165 km/h) (1-min); 963 mbar (hPa)

On September 24, a non-tropical low formed along a frontal boundary over the North Atlantic. The low detached from the frontal boundary and acquired organized convection, transitioning into a tropical storm late on September 25 about 590 mi (955 km) northeast of Bermuda. Operationally, the NHC began issuing advisories early on September 26, naming the storm Isaac. While moving generally eastward, the storm steadily became better organized and became a Category 1 hurricane on September 27. As it turned toward the northeast, Isaac continued to strengthen into the next day, intensifying to a Category 2 hurricane. It later reached its peak intensity, with maximum sustained winds of 105 mph (165 km/h) and a minimum barometric pressure of 963 mbar (28.44 inHg). Isaac's intensification then leveled off under the influence of increasingly unfavorable ocean temperatures, wind shear, and dry air, weakening back to a tropical storm late on September 29. Isaac then began extratropical transition, which it completed early on September 30 approximately 315 mi (505 km) north-northwest of the Azores.

Swells from the system reached Bermuda's coast. Another extratropical system absorbed moisture from Isaac, which brought heavy rain to the Iberian Peninsula.

=== Tropical Storm Joyce ===
- Tropical storm (SSHWS)
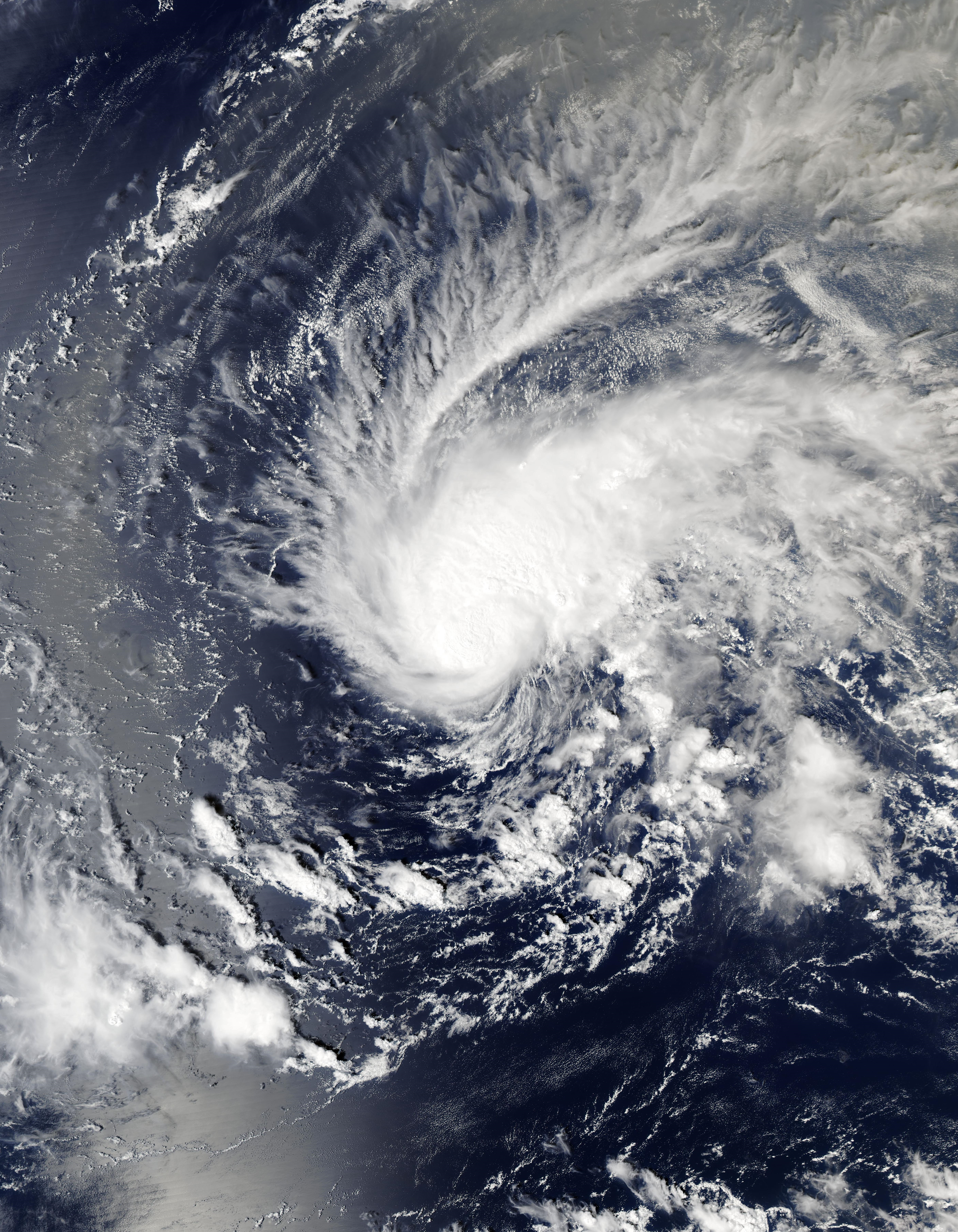
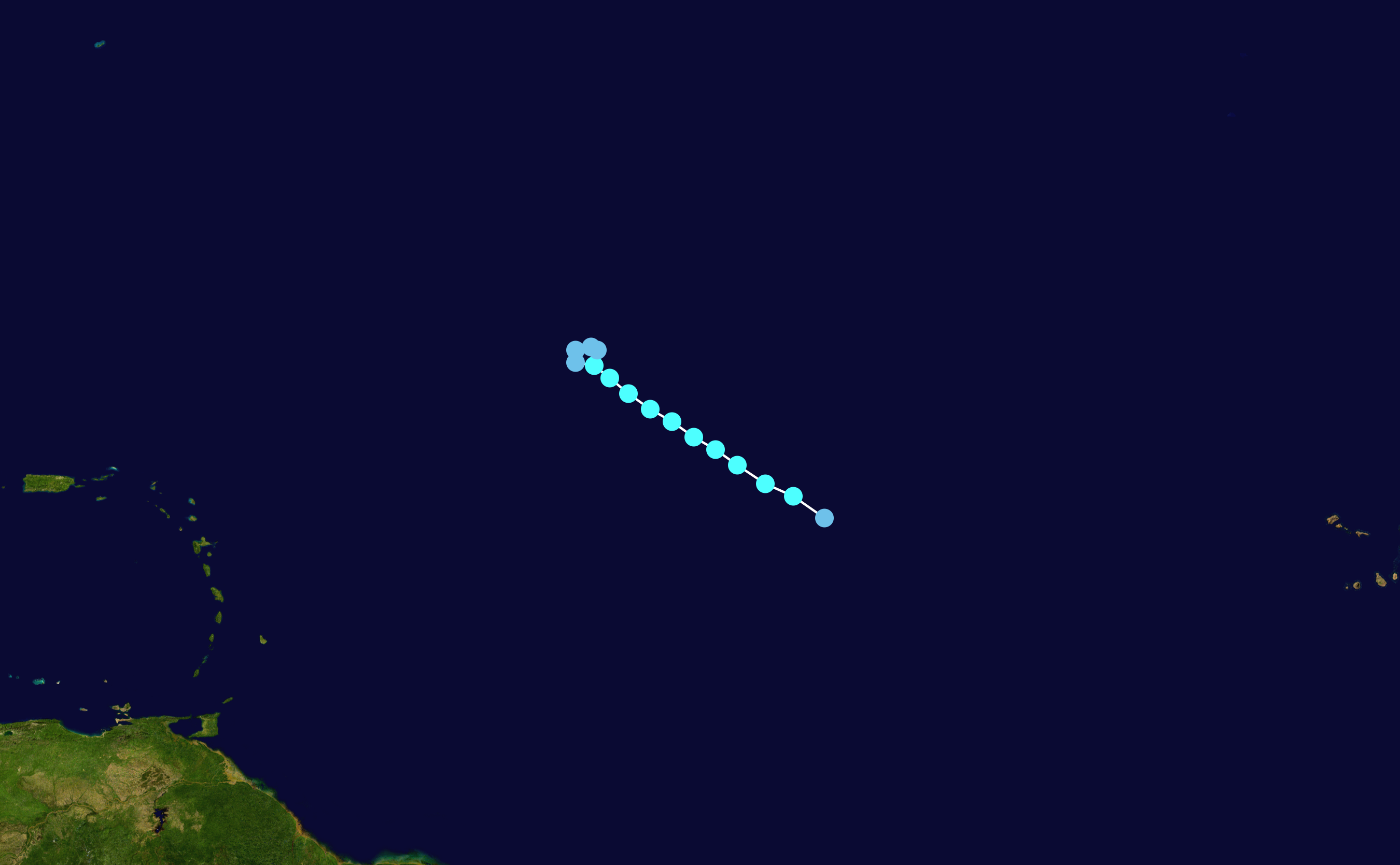
- Duration: September 27 – September 30
- Peak intensity: 50 mph (85 km/h) (1-min); 1001 mbar (hPa)

On September 22, a tropical wave moved off the coast of West Africa. After passing through the Cabo Verde Islands on September 24, thunderstorm activity increased as the wave moved to the west-northwest. The low became condensed and deepened, forming into a tropical depression at 06:00 UTC on September 27 about 1,345 mi (2,165 km) east of the Leeward Islands. Joyce reached its peak intensity at 18:00 UTC with winds of 50 mph (80 km/h) and a minimum pressure of 1,001 mbar (29.6 inHg). By September 28, Joyce began to weaken as southerly wind shear displaced convection away from its center, weakening to a tropical depression the next day. Joyce degenerated into a remnant low by September 30.

=== Hurricane Kirk ===
- Category 4 hurricane (SSHWS)
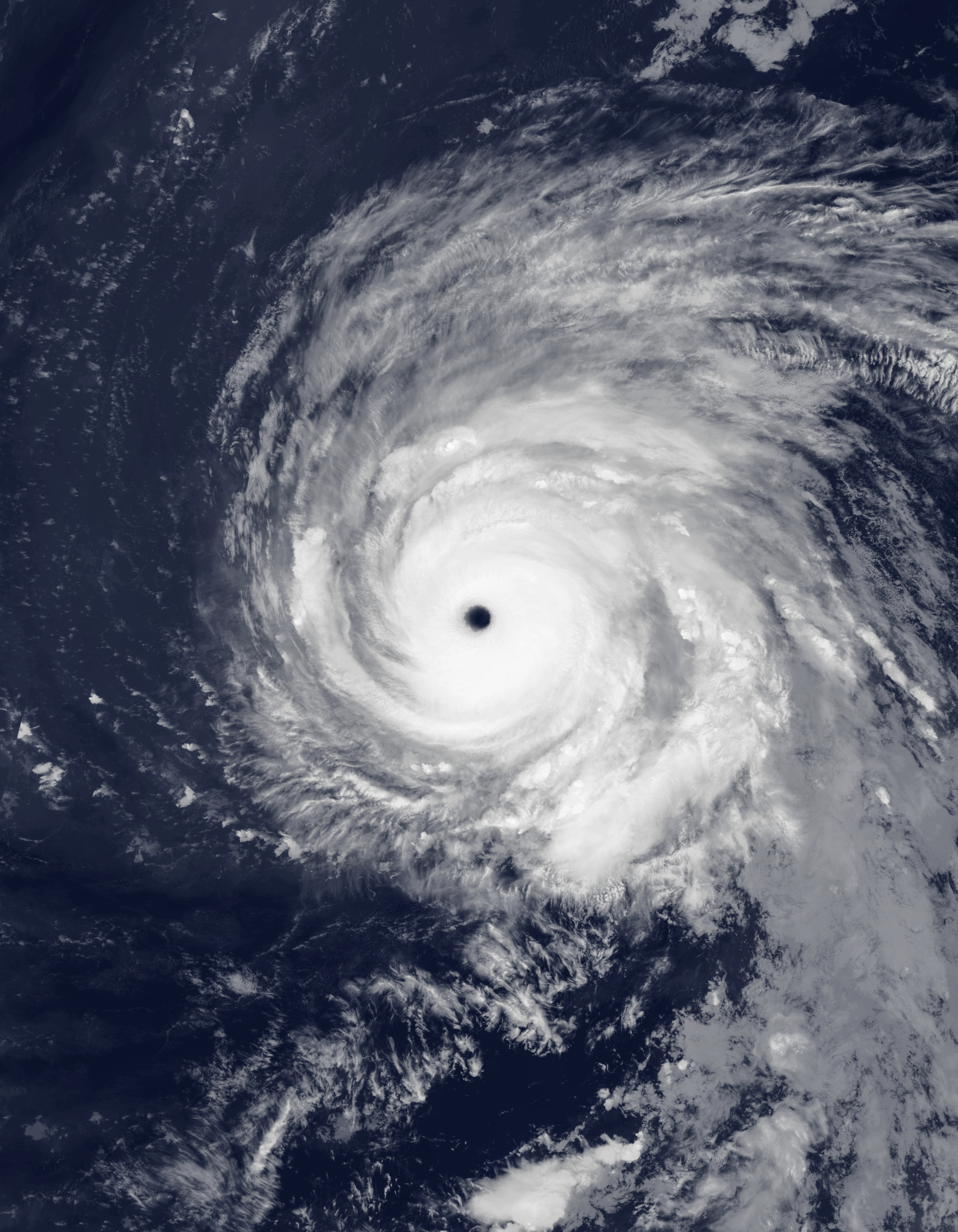
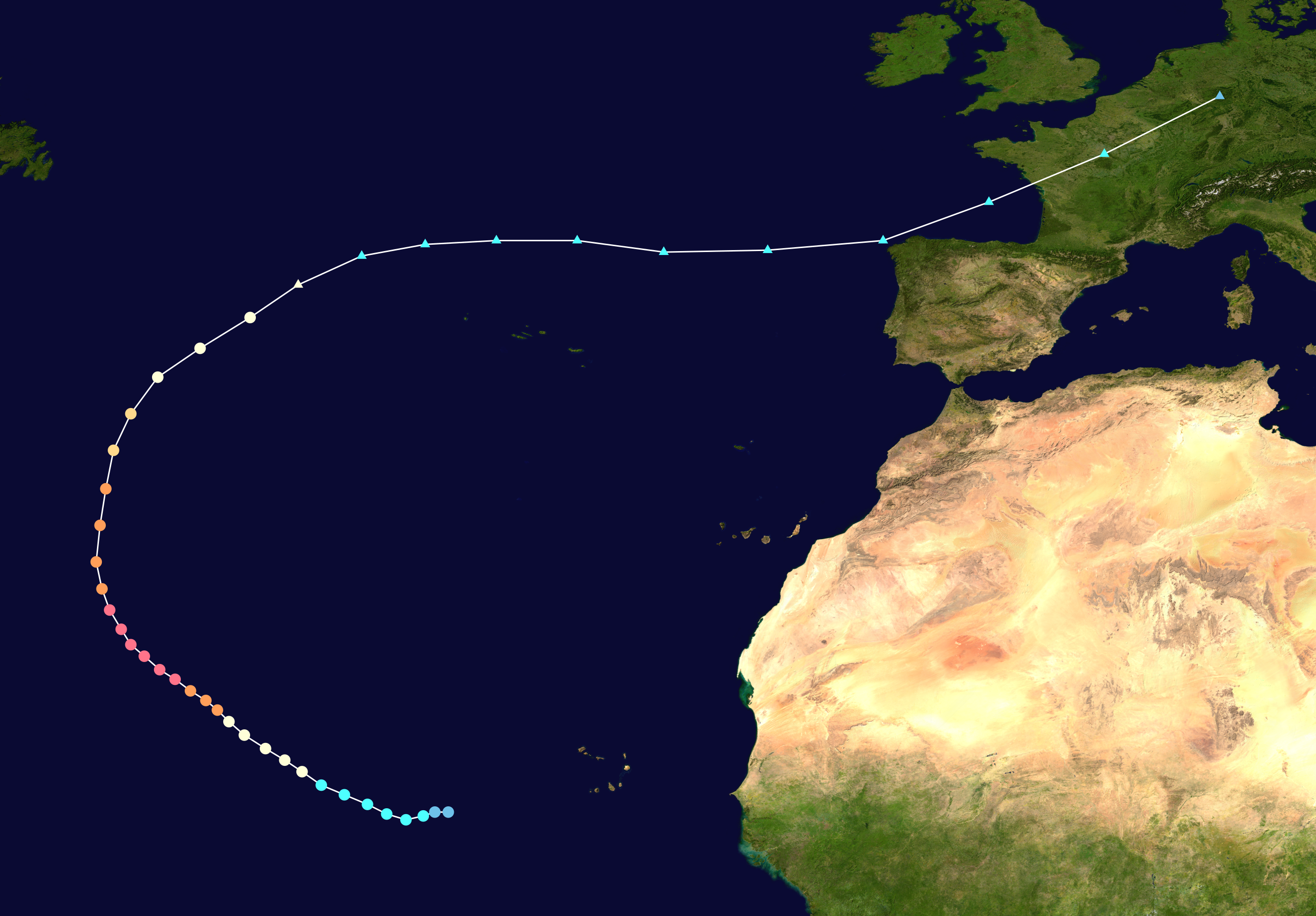
- Duration: September 29 – October 7
- Peak intensity: 150 mph (240 km/h) (1-min); 928 mbar (hPa)

On September 25, a tropical wave crossed the west coast of Africa and entered the Atlantic. After the wave passed through the Cabo Verde Islands on September 27, its associated convection began to organize. By late on September 29, a well-defined circulation formed, indicating that Tropical Depression Twelve developed about 520 mi (835 km) west of the islands. The depression strengthened into Tropical Storm Kirk around 06:00 UTC the next day, nine hours before satellite imagery indicated a partial eyewall. Favorable environmental conditions allowed Kirk to intensify into a hurricane by late on October 1 while it moved west-northwestward. Kirk underwent rapid intensification over the following two days, and at 00:00 UTC on October 4, the storm peaked as a Category 4 hurricane with winds of 150 mph (240 km/h) and a minimum pressure of 928 mbar (27.4 inHg). An eyewall replacement cycle, increasing wind shear, and drier air caused Kirk to begin weakening as it turned northward, falling to Category 3 status at 06:00 UTC on October 5. The storm then weakened below major hurricane intensity about 24 hours later and then to a Category 1 late on October 6 while heading northeastward. Kirk became extratropical about 475 mi (765 km) west-northwest of the Azores on October 7, but the remnants crossed western Europe before dissipating over western Germany on October 10.

Kirk brought high surf to the East Coast of the United States. Numerous downed trees were reported in Portugal and Spain. The hardest hit city was Porto, where numerous cars suffered damage and train services were disrupted. At the height of the storm, more than 300,000 households lost power. Strong winds from Kirk severely affected Portugal's apple and chestnut crops. In Spain, 2.76 in (70.1 mm) of rain fell in 12 hours, and gusts up to 80 mph (130 km/h) and 127 mph (205 km/h) were reported. Mudslides were reported in Galicia, prompting road closures. Agricultural losses in Spain are estimated to be at €69 million (US$71.9 million). In France, over 64,000 people lost power, and many roads were closed due to floodwaters. A strong swell capsized three boats in Sète, killing one person and injuring another. Kirk caused widespread flooding in France with 2.8–2.9 in (72–74 mm) of rain of Noirmoutier and 2.8 in (71 mm) of rain in Paris. Gusts up to 70 mph (113 km/h) and 86 mph (139 km/h) were reported in Villard-de-Lans. Aon estimated that the extratropical remnants of Kirk caused about US$110 million in damage.

=== Hurricane Leslie ===
- Category 2 hurricane (SSHWS)
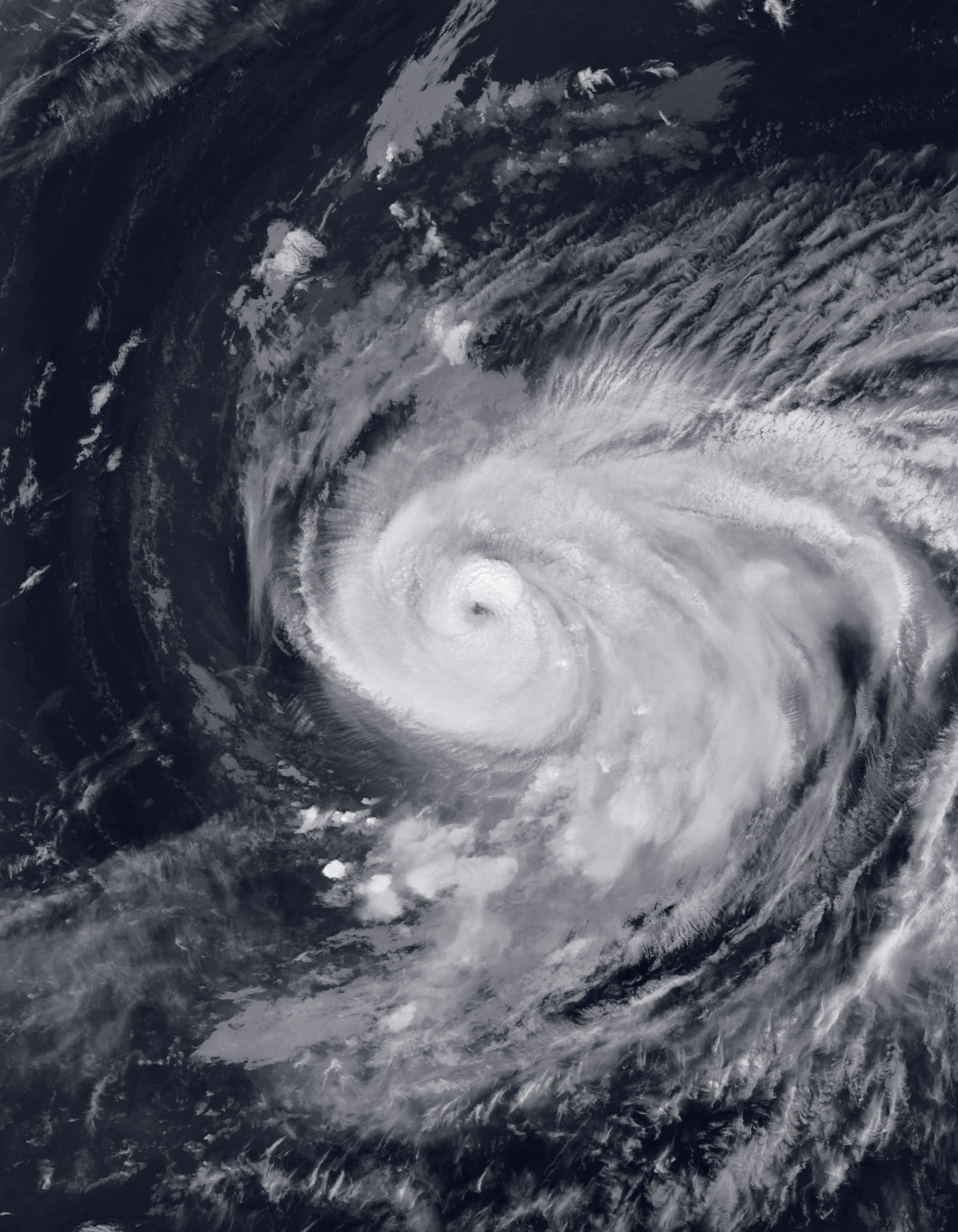
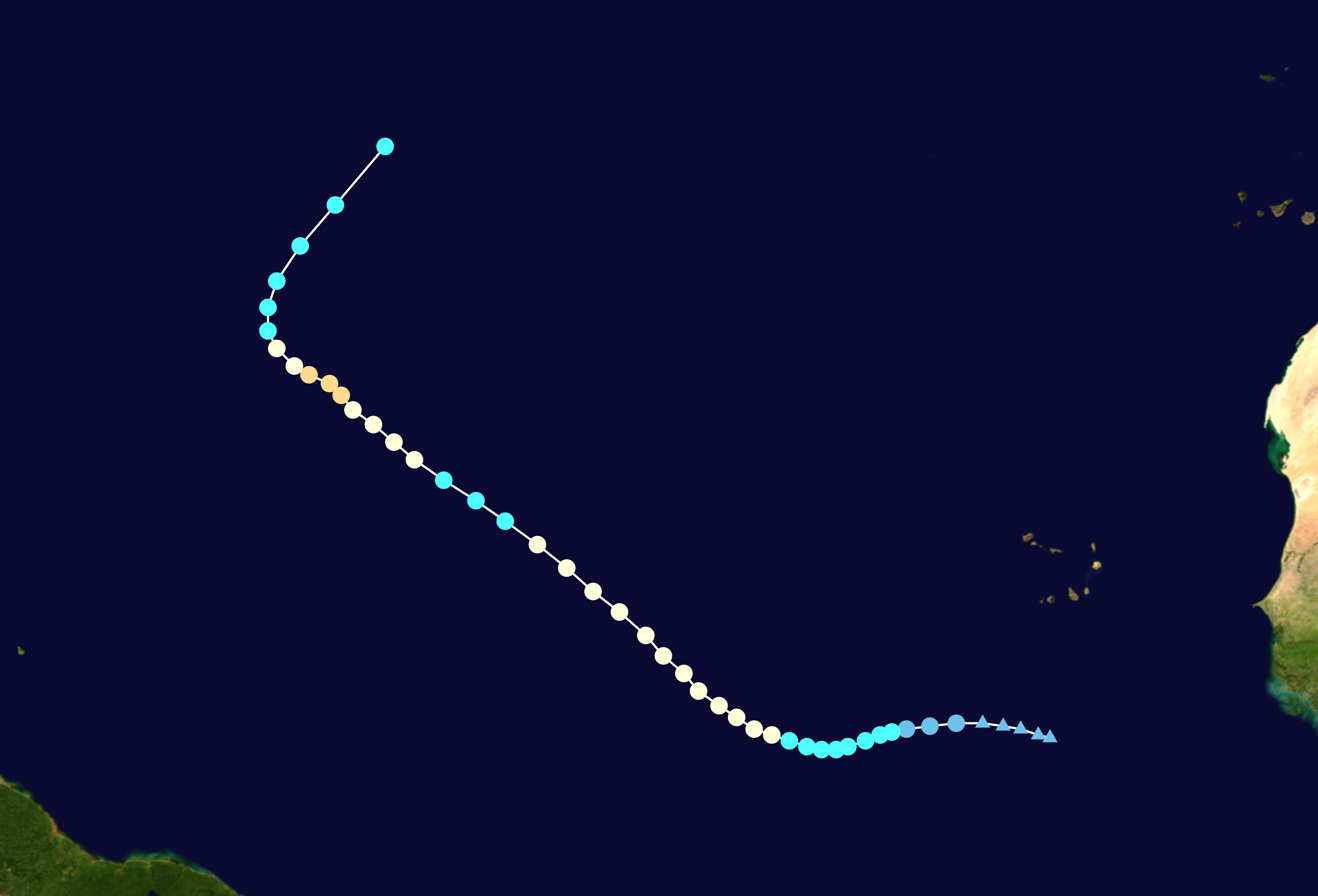
- Duration: October 2 – October 12
- Peak intensity: 105 mph (165 km/h) (1-min); 970 mbar (hPa)

A tropical wave moved off the west coast of Africa and into the Atlantic on September 28, initially with limited shower activity. On October 1, a well-defined low formed, although it had disorganized convection. Because deep convection organized closer to the center on the following day, Tropical Depression Thirteen developed at 06:00 UTC approximately 345 mi (555 km) south-southeast of the Cabo Verde Islands. Later on October 2, the system strengthened, becoming Tropical Storm Leslie, despite moving slowly westward within a moderate wind shear environment due to the outflow from Hurricane Kirk to its northwest. On October 5, Leslie intensified into a Category 1 hurricane and reached sustained winds as high as 90 mph (150 km/h) on the next day, before weakening back to a tropical storm on October 8. Leslie restrengthened into a hurricane later that day after moving over warmer waters, becoming a Category 2 hurricane early on October 10, peaking with winds of 105 mph (165 km/h) and a minimum pressure of 970 mbar (29 inHg). At 00:00 UTC the next day, Leslie weakened to a tropical storm as northerly wind shear displaced most of the storm's convective activity to the south of the center, leaving the center exposed. The storm then turned northeastward and accelerated in advance of an approaching trough before being absorbed by the aforementioned trough on October 12 about 1,040 mi (1,675 km) east of Bermuda.

The trough and subsequent extratropical low that absorbed Leslie's remnant moisture brought significant flooding to France and Italy.

=== Hurricane Milton ===
- Category 5 hurricane (SSHWS)
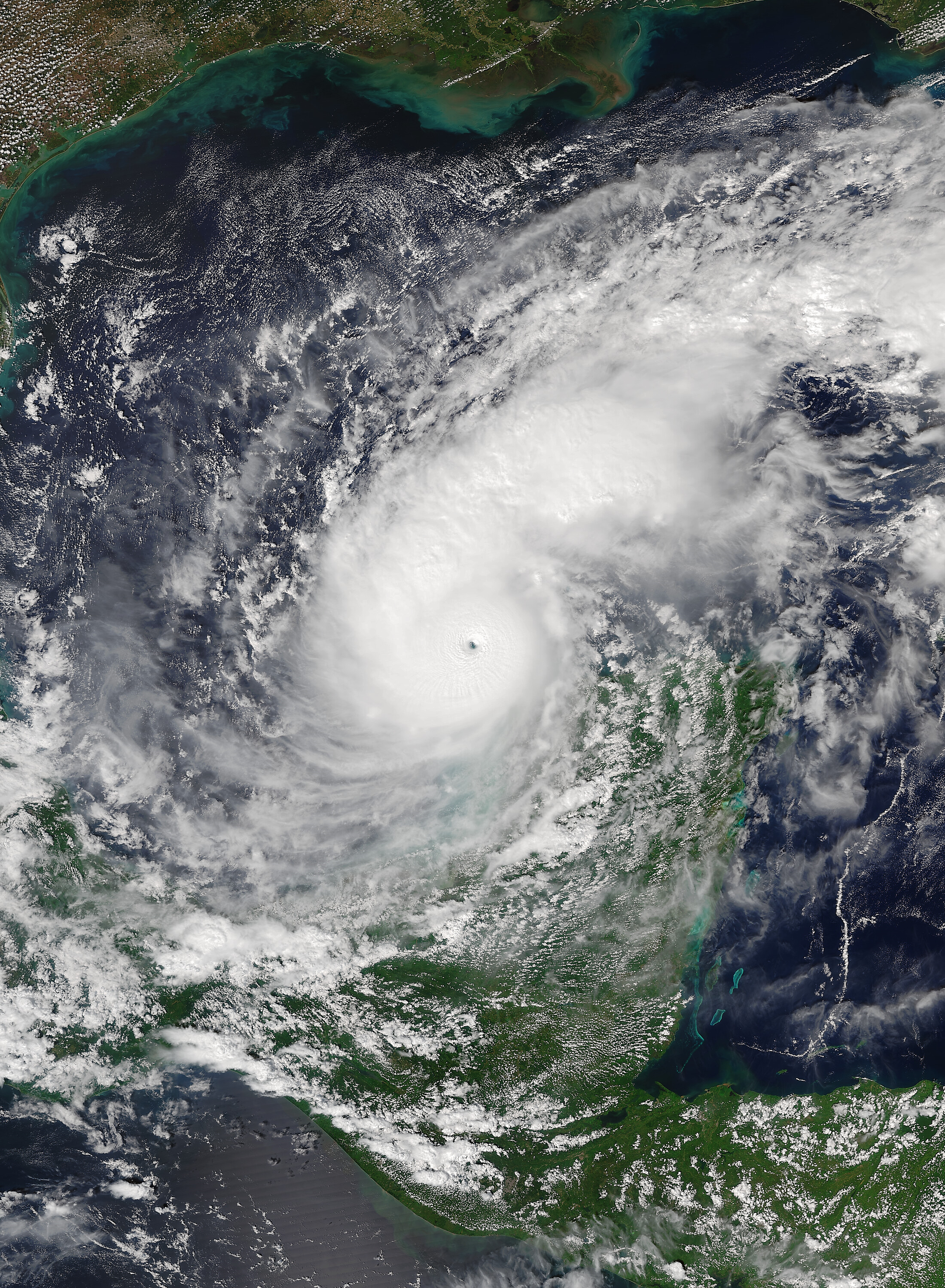
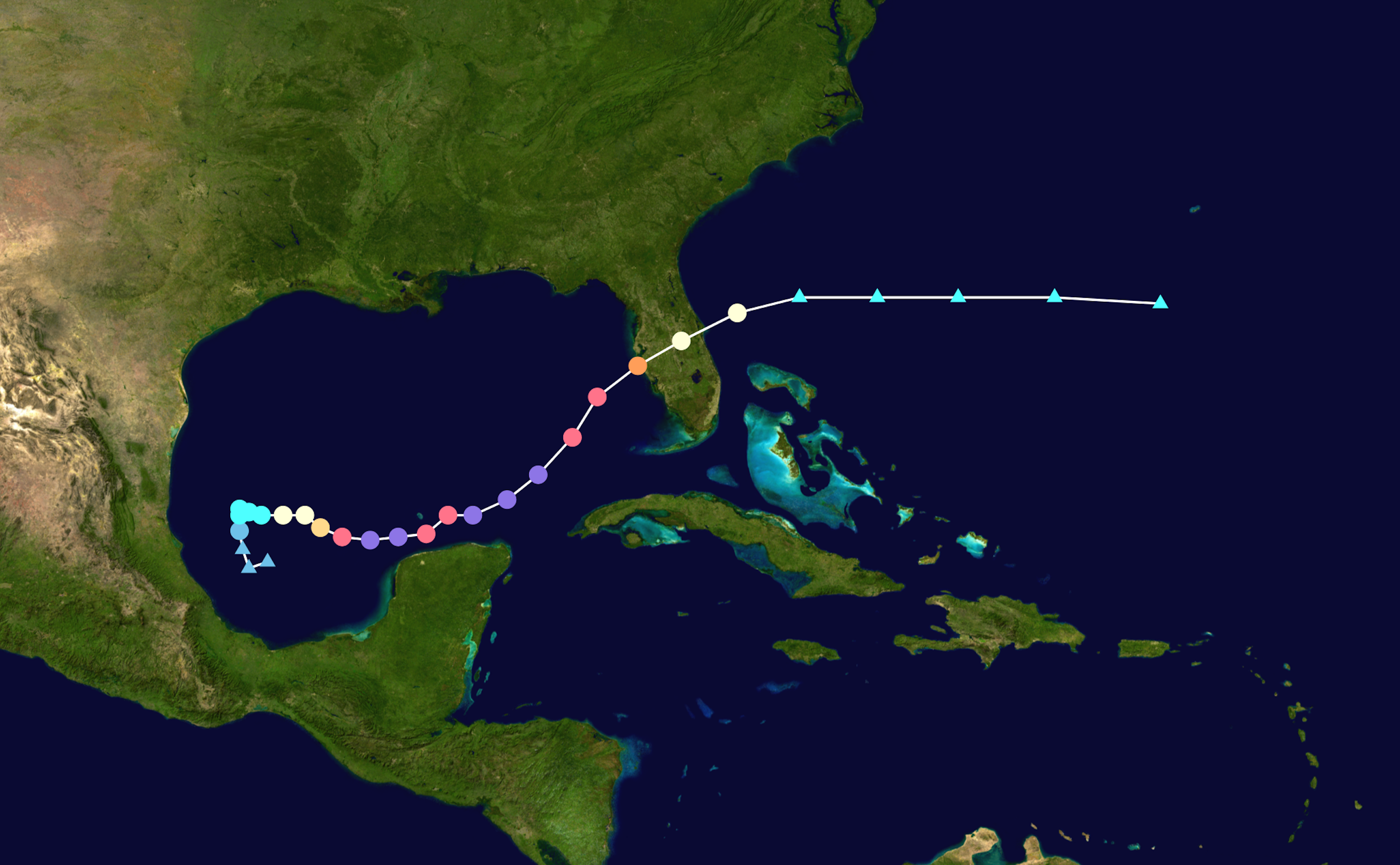
- Duration: October 5 – October 10
- Peak intensity: 180 mph (285 km/h) (1-min); 895 mbar (hPa)

In mid-September, two African tropical waves and a low-level trough merged over the eastern Atlantic. Although disorganized upon reaching the Lesser Antilles on September 26, the wave began interacting with a CAG over the western Caribbean on September 29. This led to the formation of a low-level trough with two centers over the Gulf of Mexico. One center persisted, resulting in the development of Tropical Depression Fourteen about 155 mi (250 km) east of Tampico, Tamaulipas, at 12:00 UTC on October 5. Strengthening into Tropical Storm Milton within six hours, the cyclone moved slowly eastward to east-southeastward over the next few days along the southern periphery of the mid-latitude westerlies. Milton underwent explosive intensification due to very warm waters and low-to-moderate wind shear, becoming a hurricane around 18:00 UTC on October 6 and then a major hurricane within 18 hours thereafter. At 20:00 UTC on October 7, the system peaked as a Category 5 hurricane with winds of 180 mph (285 km/h) and a minimum pressure of 895 mbar (26.4 inHg).

Early on October 8, the storm weakened to a Category 4 hurricane due to an eyewall replacement cycle; however, upon the cycle's completion, it quickly restrengthened back to Category 5 intensity while turning northeastward in response to stronger deep-layer southwesterly flow. However, the next day, Milton weakened to a Category 4 hurricane and then to Category 3 intensity late on October 9 because of increasing wind shear. At 00:30 UTC on October 10, Milton struck near Siesta Key, Florida, with 115 mph (185 km/h) winds. Milton weakened over Florida and entered the Atlantic as a Category 1 hurricane, merging with a nearby frontal boundary. Around 18:00 UTC on October 10, it had transitioned into an extratropical low. The extratropical low gradually weakened, passed near Bermuda on October 11, and merged with a frontal zone on October 12.

In Mexico, Yucatán was affected by storm surge and heavy rainfall. Flooding occurred in Campeche and Celestún, with the latter being evacuated as result. Three people died in Mexico, all due to drowning. Western Cuba received flooding and strong winds from Milton. In Florida, 126 tornado warnings were issued on October 9, the second-most posted in a single day in one state, behind only April 27, 2011, in Alabama during a super outbreak. There were 45 tornadoes confirmed, causing approximately $681.8 million in damage, with an EF3 tornado in St. Lucie County killing 6 people. Significant storm surge impacted Southwest Florida, generally ranging from 6 to 9 ft (1.8 to 2.7 m) above ground. Venice reported the highest sustained winds and gusts in Florida, reaching 91 mph (146 km/h) and 107 mph (172 km/h), respectively. Heavy rains also fell, especially in a swath from Tampa Bay to the Daytona Beach area, with a peak total of 20.4 in (520 mm) near St. Petersburg. Insurance firm ICEYE estimated that Milton damaged approximately 150,000 structures in Florida, over 13,000 of which were flooded with more than 5 ft (1.5 m) of water. Among the structures damaged were the Tampa Bay Times building and Tropicana Field. Overall, Milton killed 39 people, and the NCEI estimated that damage in the United States totaled about $34.3 billion, almost entirely in Florida, although damage assessments were complicated due to Helene impacting some of the same areas only about two weeks earlier. The Bahamas saw minor effects from Milton.

=== Tropical Storm Nadine ===
- Tropical storm (SSHWS)
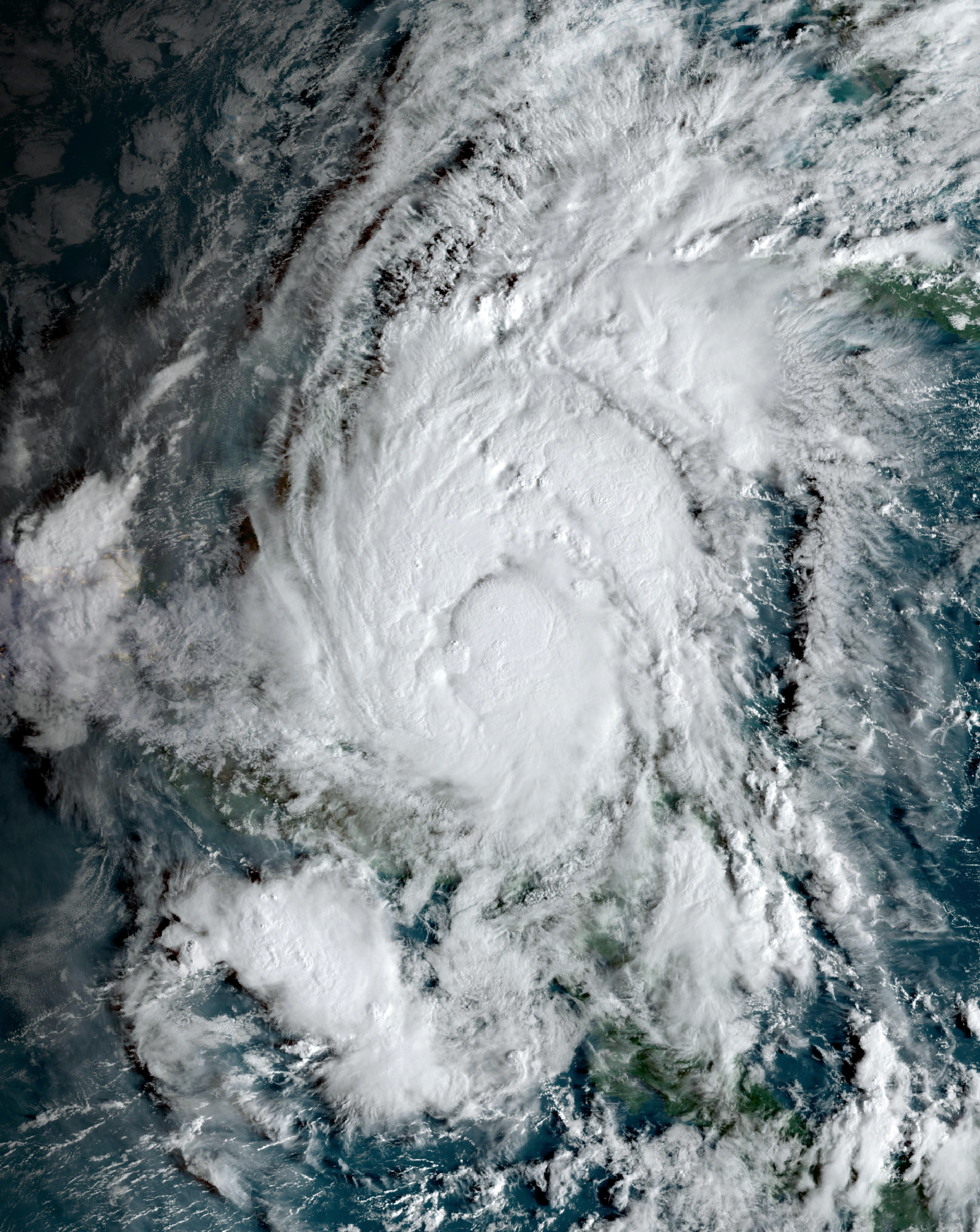
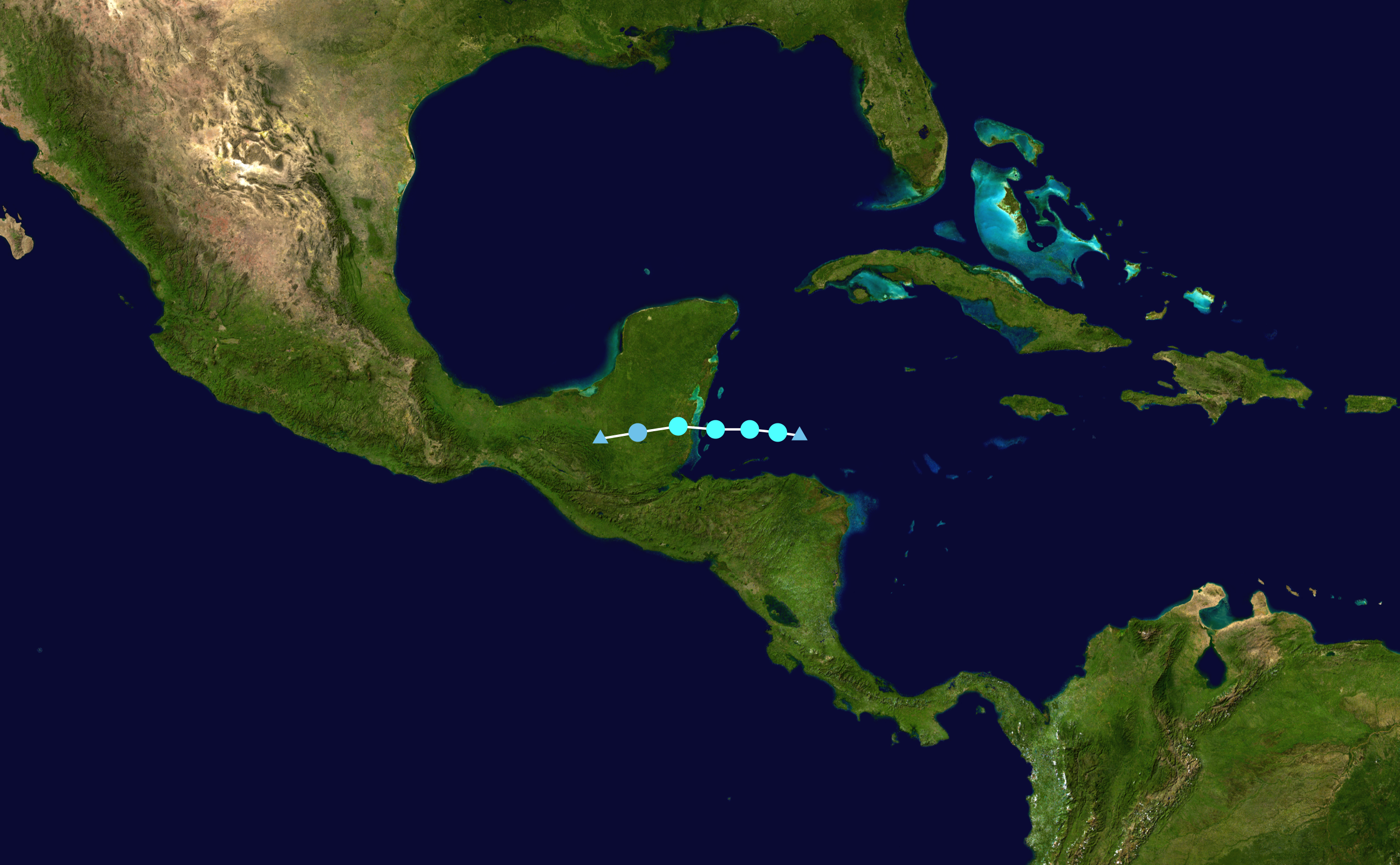
- Duration: October 19 – October 20
- Peak intensity: 60 mph (95 km/h) (1-min); 1002 mbar (hPa)

On October 15, a broad area of low pressure formed in the southwestern Caribbean Sea east of Central America. The disturbance moved slowly northwestward over the following couple of days, remaining offshore. Then, on October 17 and 18, the low gradually became better defined, and the showers and thunderstorms associated with it became better organized. Consequently, the system was designated Potential Tropical Cyclone Fifteen on the afternoon of October 18. The system quickly developed a closed circulation and intensified into Tropical Storm Nadine early the next day while about 185 mi (300 km) east of Belize City. The storm made landfall near Belize City around 16:00 UTC on October 19, at peak intensity, with 60 mph (95 km/h) sustained winds and a minimum pressure of 1,002 mbar (29.6 inHg). Eight hours later, the storm weakened to a tropical depression while over northern Guatemala. Then, early on October 20, the system degenerated into a remnant low while traversing Southern Mexico. Nadine's remnants ultimately entered the Pacific basin, where they facilitated the development of a trough of low pressure in the Gulf of Tehuantepec, which led to the formation of Hurricane Kristy on October 21.

Nadine produced rainfall totals of up to 2 in (51 mm) in Belize. In Quintana Roo, about 3.5 in (90 mm) of rain was recorded, and several houses were flooded in Chetumal. Floods, power outages, and uprooted trees were also reported in Campeche, with strong waves stranding about 300 coastal vessels. In Quintana Roo, Mex$11 million (US$546,000) was spent to repair the damage caused by the storm. In Chiapas, the storm damaged more than 1,200 homes. A landslide also blocked a section of Federal Highway 190. Heavy rains also damaged 15 houses and caused flooding and landslides in Tacotalpa, Tabasco. There were four deaths in Chiapas as a result of the storm: two when a landslide hit a house in the municipality of Tila and two due to drowning after being swept away by flood waters. Damage in Chiapas reached approximately Mex$2 billion (US$101 million). There were also nine fatalities in Veracruz, including one after his house was overtaken by a mudslide in Sierra de Zongolica and another in Santiago Tuxtla as a result of an electrocution; a man also went missing after being swept away by flooding. In Veracruz, damage totaled to Mex$2.82 billion (US$153 million).

=== Hurricane Oscar ===
- Category 1 hurricane (SSHWS)
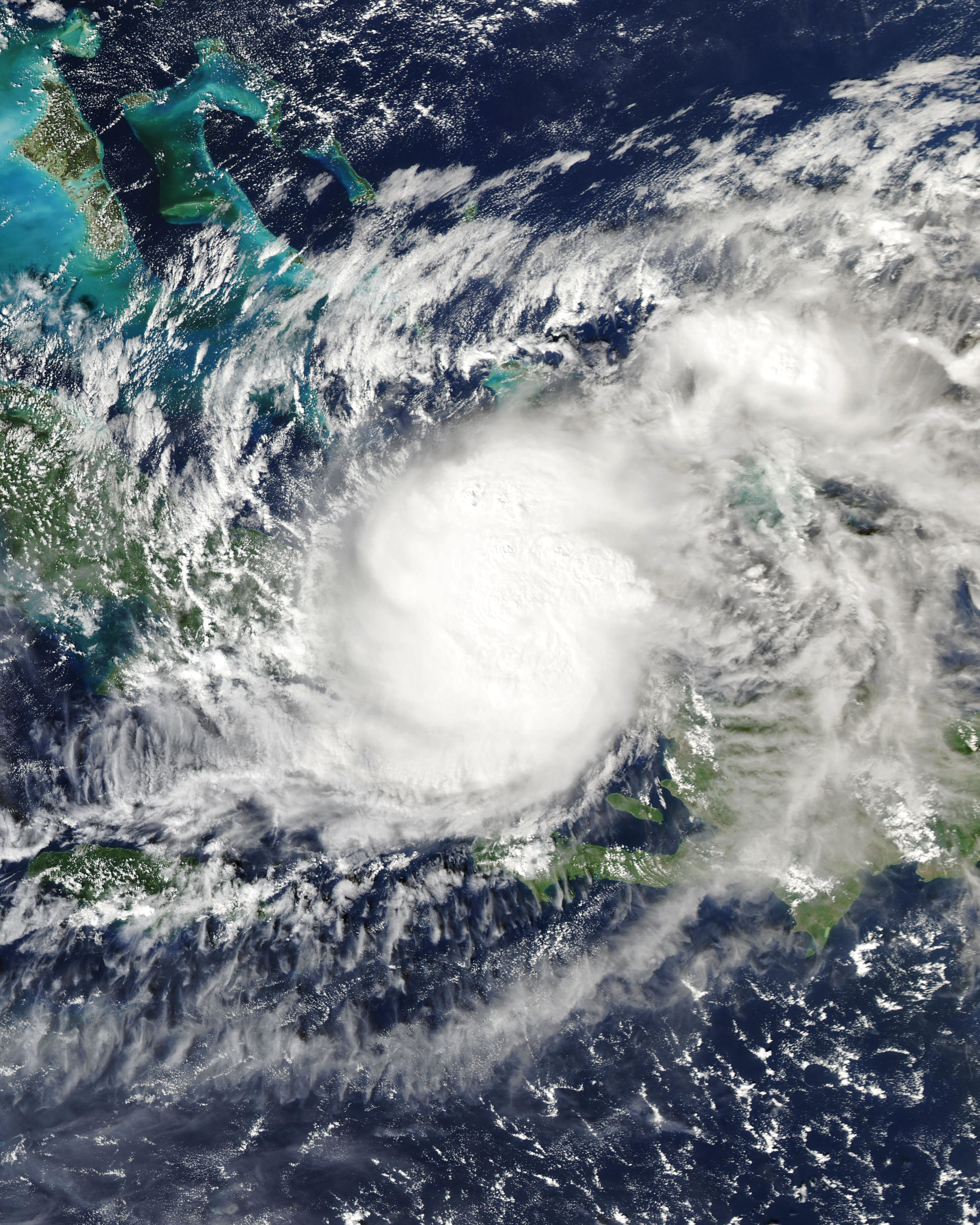
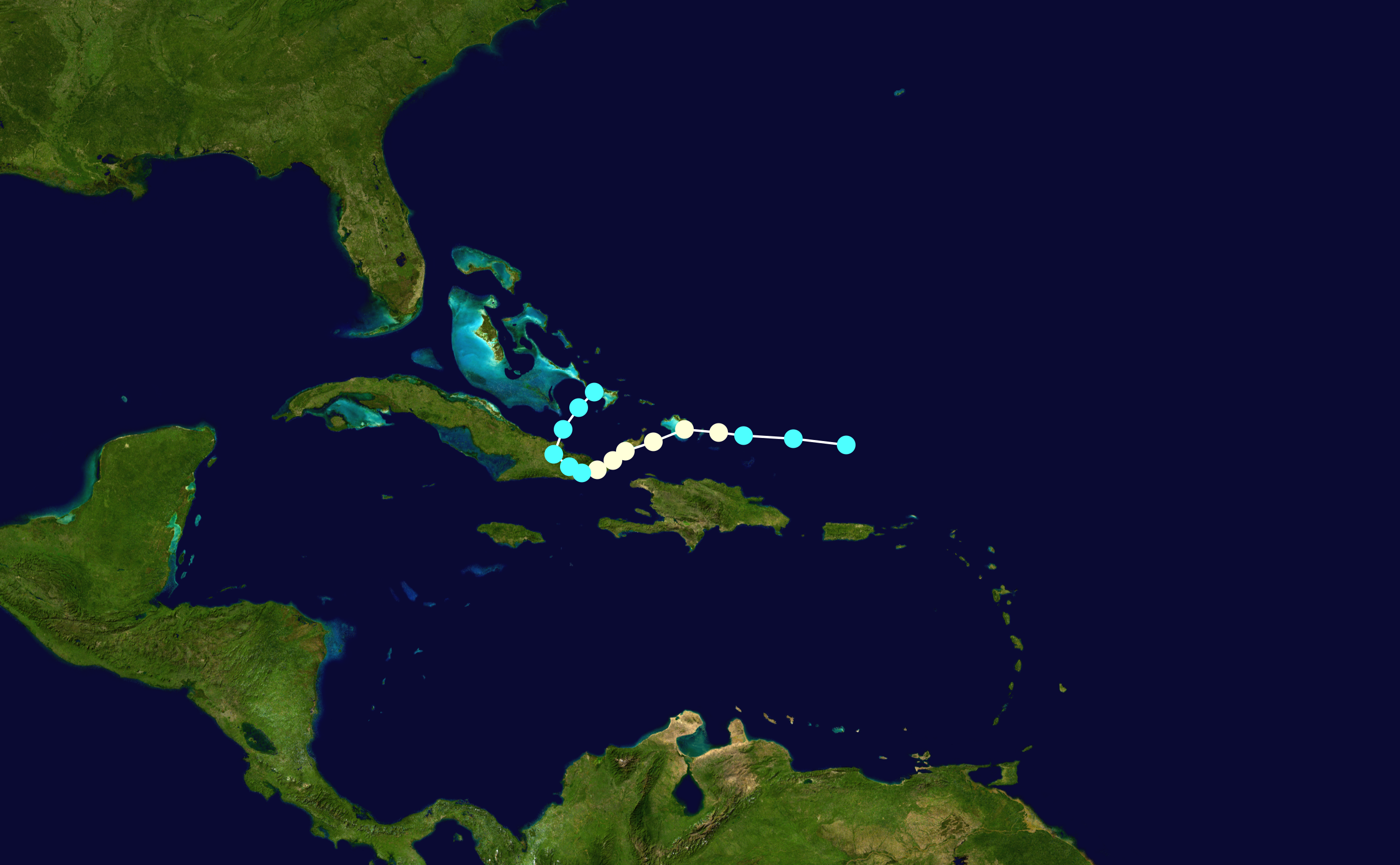
- Duration: October 19 – October 22
- Peak intensity: 85 mph (140 km/h) (1-min); 984 mbar (hPa)

On October 10, a tropical wave emerged into the Atlantic from the west coast of Africa. After remaining disorganized for several days due to dry air and moderate wind shear, a circulation began developing as the system passed north of the Lesser Antilles, and early on October 19, Tropical Storm Oscar formed approximately 180 mi (290 km) north of Puerto Rico. In addition to very warm seas and light to moderate wind shear, the cyclone's small size allowed for quick intensification, with Oscar reaching hurricane status by 18:00 UTC. Hurricane-force winds extended less than 6 mi (10 km) from the center. Late on October 19, Oscar struck Grand Turk Island with winds of 85 mph (140 km/h). The system then turned southwestward due to low- to mid-level ridge over the eastern United States and passed near Inagua in the Bahamas on October 20, shortly before Oscar's barometric pressure fell to 984 mbar (29.1 inHg). At 22:00 UTC, Oscar made landfall in Baracoa, located in the Cuban province of Guantánamo. Oscar quickly weakened to a tropical storm early on October 21 and slowed considerably due to collapsing steering currents, but re-emerged into the Atlantic several hours later. Late on October 22, Oscar degenerated into a trough over the central Bahamas, before soon being absorbed by a non-tropical low.

In the Bahamas, residents of Inagua had to evacuate after their homes were damaged. Oscar downed trees and deroofed at least one residence on Grand Turk Island in the Turks and Caicos Islands. In Cuba, 6.5 ft (2.0 m) swells hit Baracoa, damaging walls and roofs of numerous structures. Approximately 15,000 structures suffered damage, mostly in Guantánamo and Holguín provinces, with more than 1,000 of those experiencing a partial roof collapse. The hurricane also caused millions of people to lose electricity and damaged roughly 35 mi (56 km) of roads, including 5 bridges. Heavy crop losses occurred over eastern Cuba. At least eight people died in the country. Aon estimated that the cyclone caused about US$50 million in damage. The remnants of Oscar, combined with a trough and tropical wave, caused urban flooding in Puerto Rico. Additionally, Oscar's remnants produced abnormally high tides in the Northeastern United States.

=== Tropical Storm Patty ===
- Tropical storm (SSHWS)
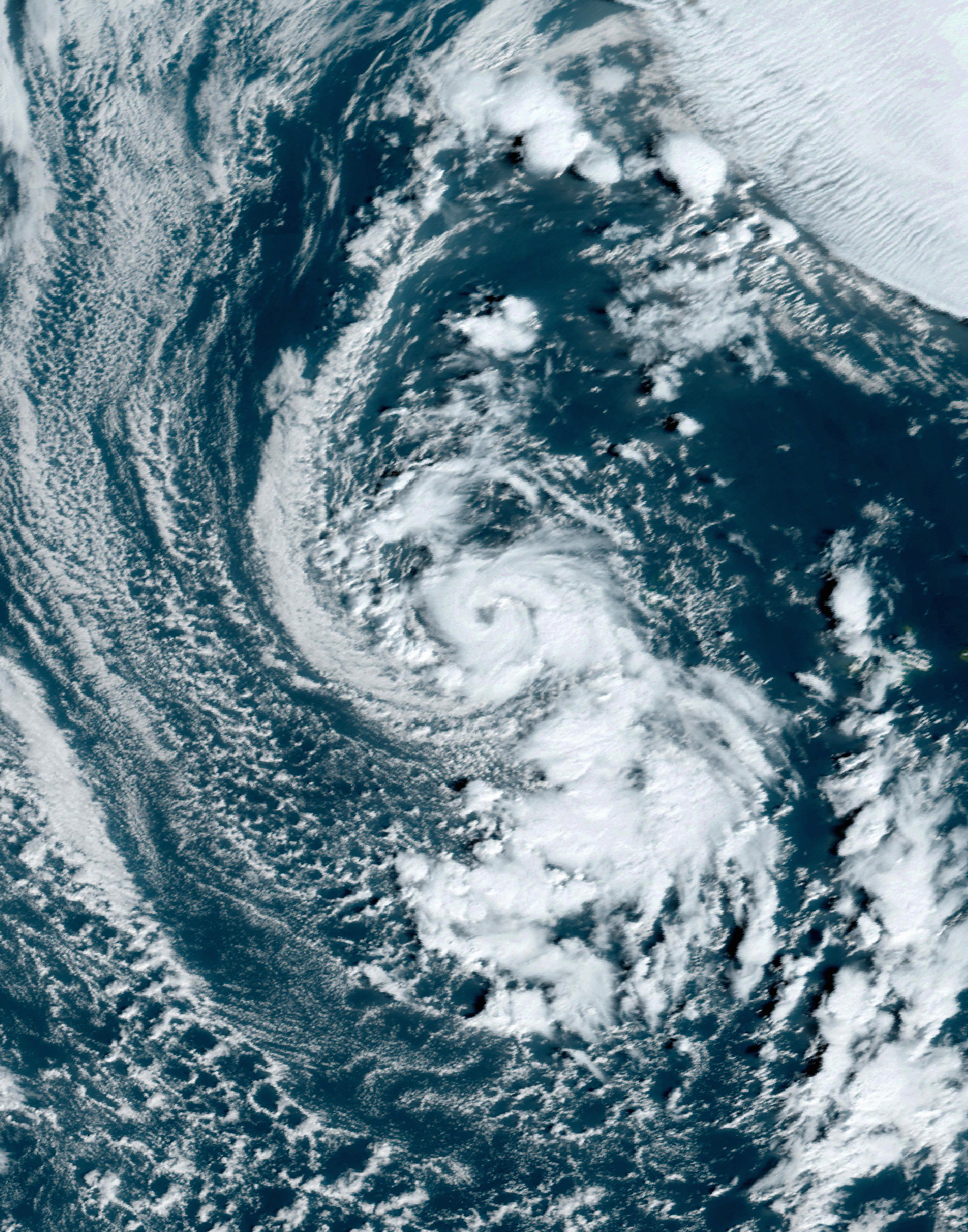
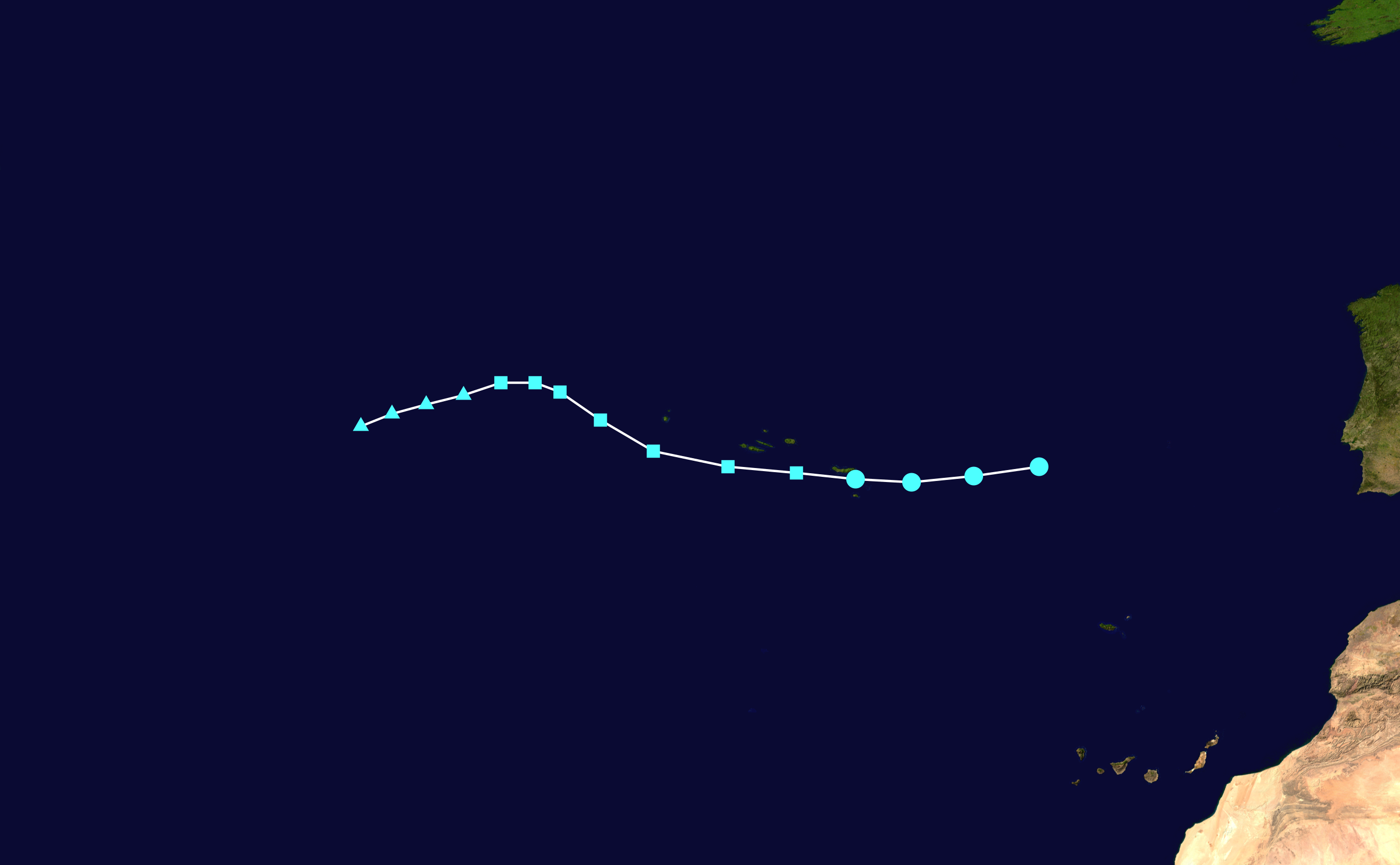
- Duration: November 1 – November 4
- Peak intensity: 65 mph (100 km/h) (1-min); 982 mbar (hPa)

On October 31, a storm-force non-tropical low located about 550 mi (885 km) west of the western Azores began producing showers and thunderstorms near its center. It moved to the northeast for around a day, losing its frontal characteristics and upper-level support, weakening in the process. On November 1, despite SSTs around 68 to 72 °F (20 to 22 °C), convection and bands formed around the center due to an unstable environment. The storm had attained hybrid characteristics of a subtropical storm. Upon formation, Patty had winds of 50 mph (80 km/h). Patty continued eastward and organized further, attaining a peak strength of 65 mph (100 km/h) at 12:00 UTC on November 2. The storm then began moving east-southeast and weakening in the mid-latitude flow. On November 3, Patty's forward speed slowed. It also developed fully into a tropical cyclone that day while passing between São Miguel and Santa Maria islands in the Azores. Patty continued to weaken and opened into a trough by 12:00 UTC on November 4.

São Miguel and Santa Maria experienced tropical storm-force winds. On São Miguel, there was flooding reported along various roadways and in a few homes. The flooding caused a landslide in the municipality of Ribeira Grande. However, overall damage was minor.

=== Hurricane Rafael ===
- Category 3 hurricane (SSHWS)
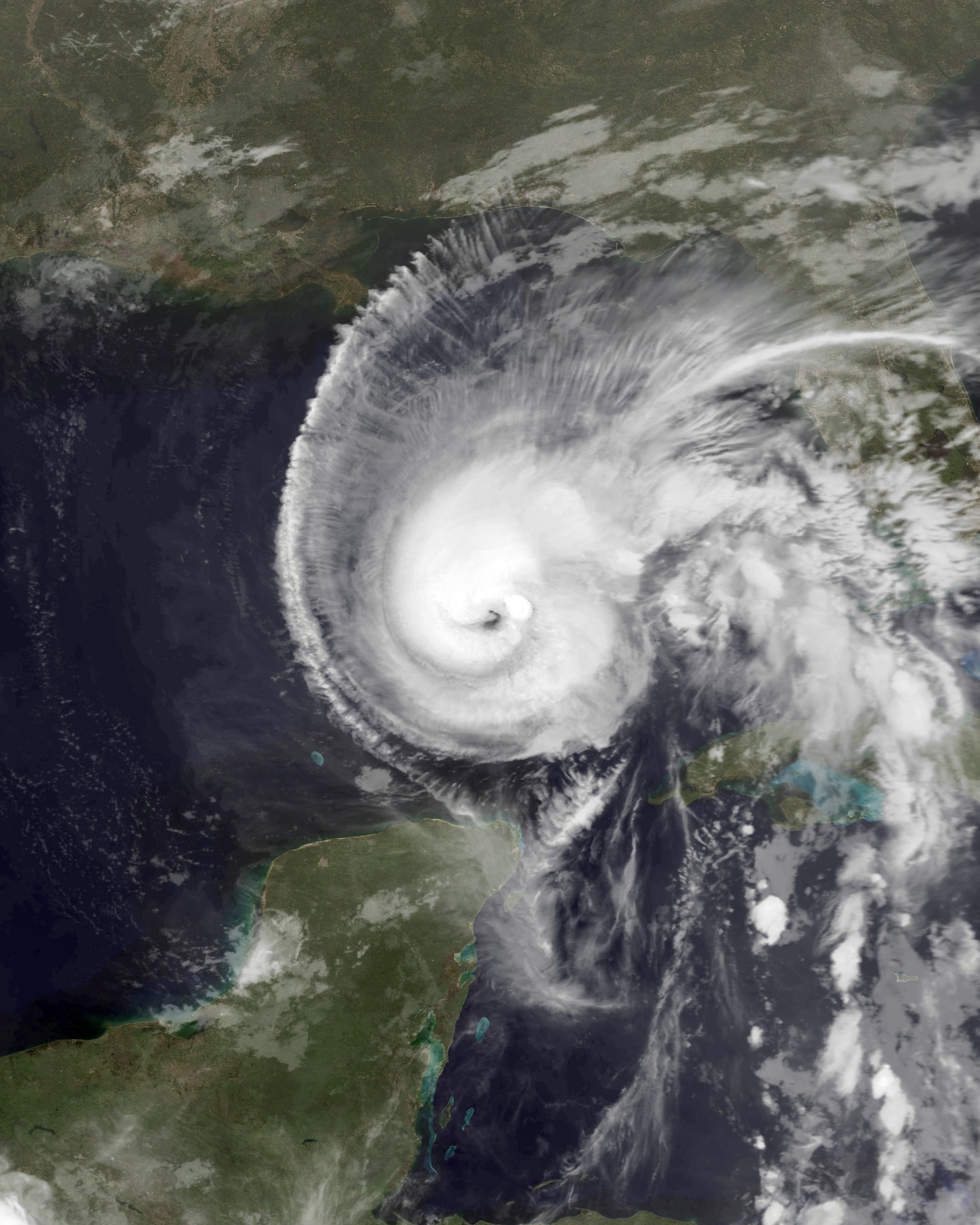
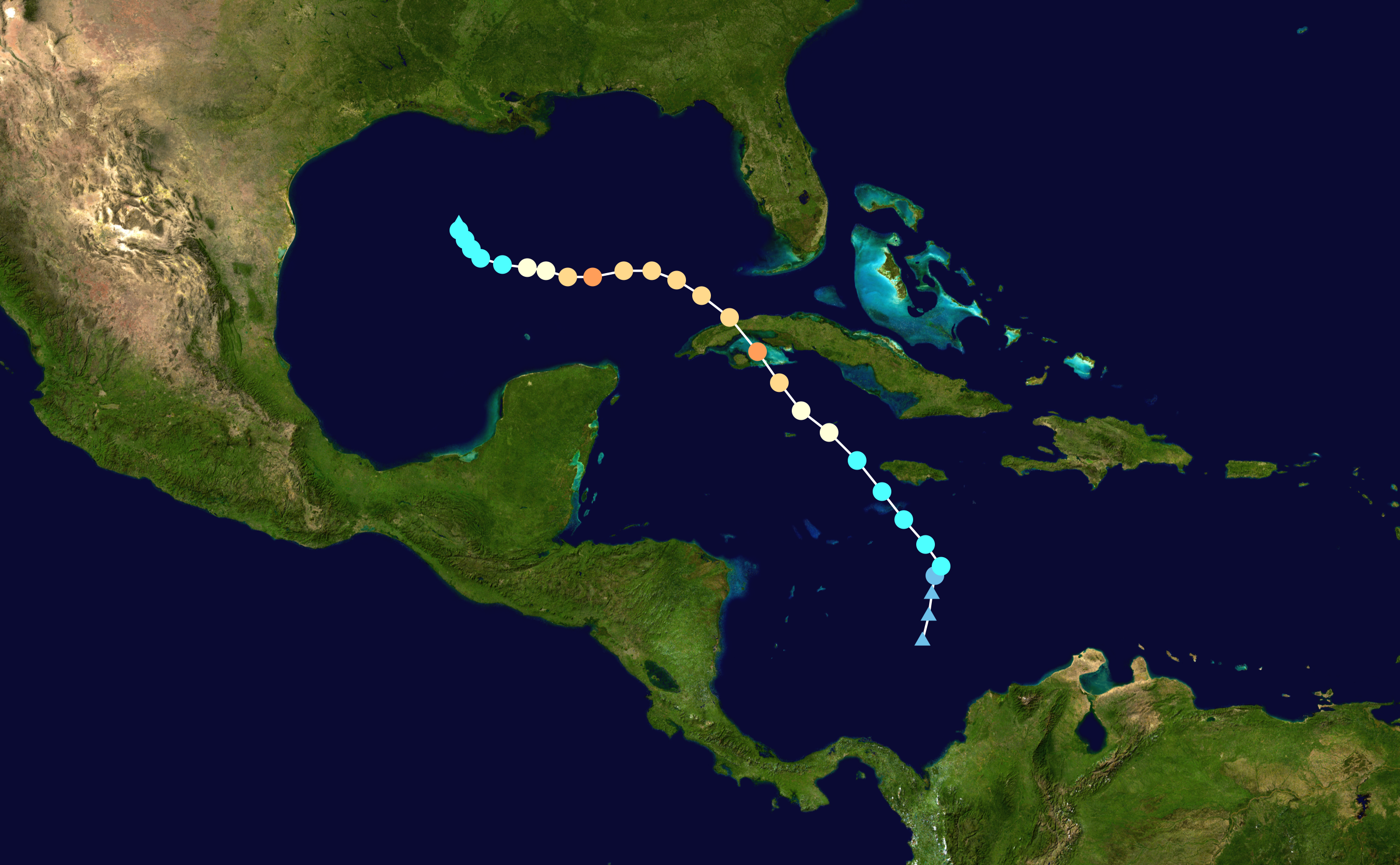
- Duration: November 4 – November 10
- Peak intensity: 120 mph (195 km/h) (1-min); 954 mbar (hPa)

On October 26, the NHC began monitoring the southwestern Caribbean in anticipation of tropical development. Convection increased markedly in early November in association with a CAG. However, the presence of a well-defined circulation could not be confirmed until November 4, when Tropical Depression Eighteen formed at 12:00 UTC roughly 205 mi (330 km) southwest of Kingston, Jamaica. The depression continued to strengthen and became Tropical Storm Rafael six hours later. The storm tracked northwestward along the southwestern side of a ridge over the western Atlantic on November 5 and passed to the west of Jamaica. That afternoon it developed an inner wind core and strengthened into a hurricane early on November 6. Later that day, at 21:15 UTC, Rafael made landfall just east of Playa Majana, in the Cuban province of Artemisa, with winds of 115 mph (185 km/h). A few hours later, the system entered the Gulf of Mexico as a weaker Category 2 hurricane. It then proceeded to turn west-northwestward and re-intensify, becoming a major hurricane once again early on November 8 with peak winds of 120 mph (195 km/h) and a minimum pressure of 954 mbar (28.2 inHg). That afternoon, however, the system turned westward and began losing strength and organization due to increasing westerly wind shear and dry air intrusion. This trend continued, and Rafael was downgraded to a tropical storm early on November 9. Rafael's remaining convection collapsed on November 10, and it degenerated into a remnant low about 230 mi (370 km) southwest of Port Fourchon, Louisiana, before opening up into a trough on the next day.

In its formative stages, Rafael produced heavy rainfall across several areas of Central America and Colombia. Numerous residents in Panama had to evacuate their homes after their houses were damaged, leaving a total of more than 210 displaced. Five people died as a result of the flooding in that country; one death was also reported in Colombia. There were two direct storm fatalities in Jamaica. Damage estimates in Panama were placed around US$110 million. Agricultural losses in Costa Rica totaled to at least ₡500 million (US$985,000). In Colombia, over 192,000 people were affected by the flooding. Aon estimated that the cyclone caused losses of at least US$150 million in Colombia. In Cuba, more than 283,000 people evacuated ahead of the storm, including 98,300 from Havana. Rafael's winds caused an island-wide power-grid failure. In western Cuba, 12 in (30 cm) of rain was reported, resulting in flooding and landslides. Government officials reported that areas in and around Artemisa sustained the worst damage from Rafael, with more than 3,000 homes damaged in Artemisa and Mayabeque provinces. In total, eight fatalities and at least $1.35 billion in damage can be attributed to Rafael, with approximately $1.08 billion in damage in Cuba alone.

=== Tropical Storm Sara ===
- Tropical storm (SSHWS)
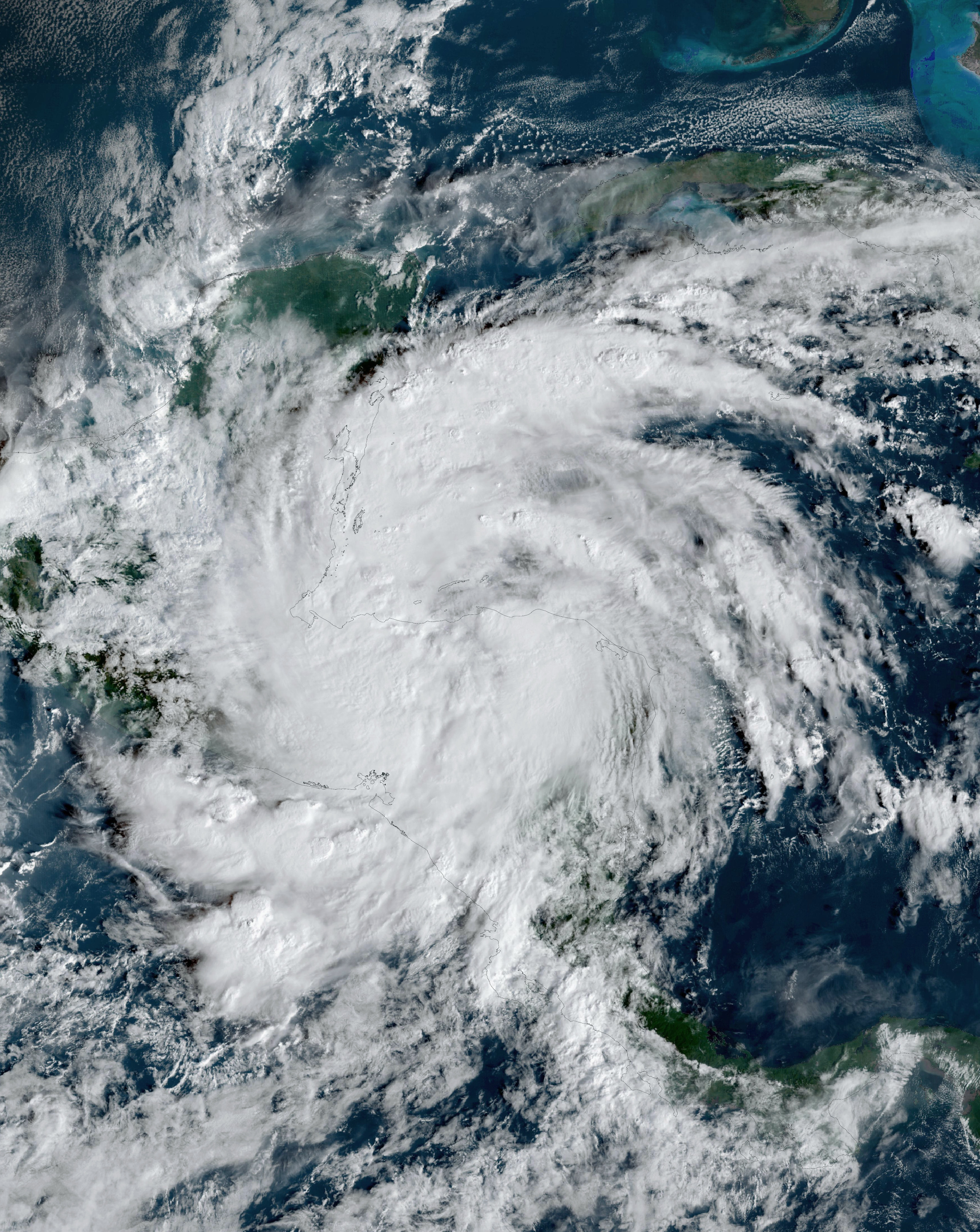
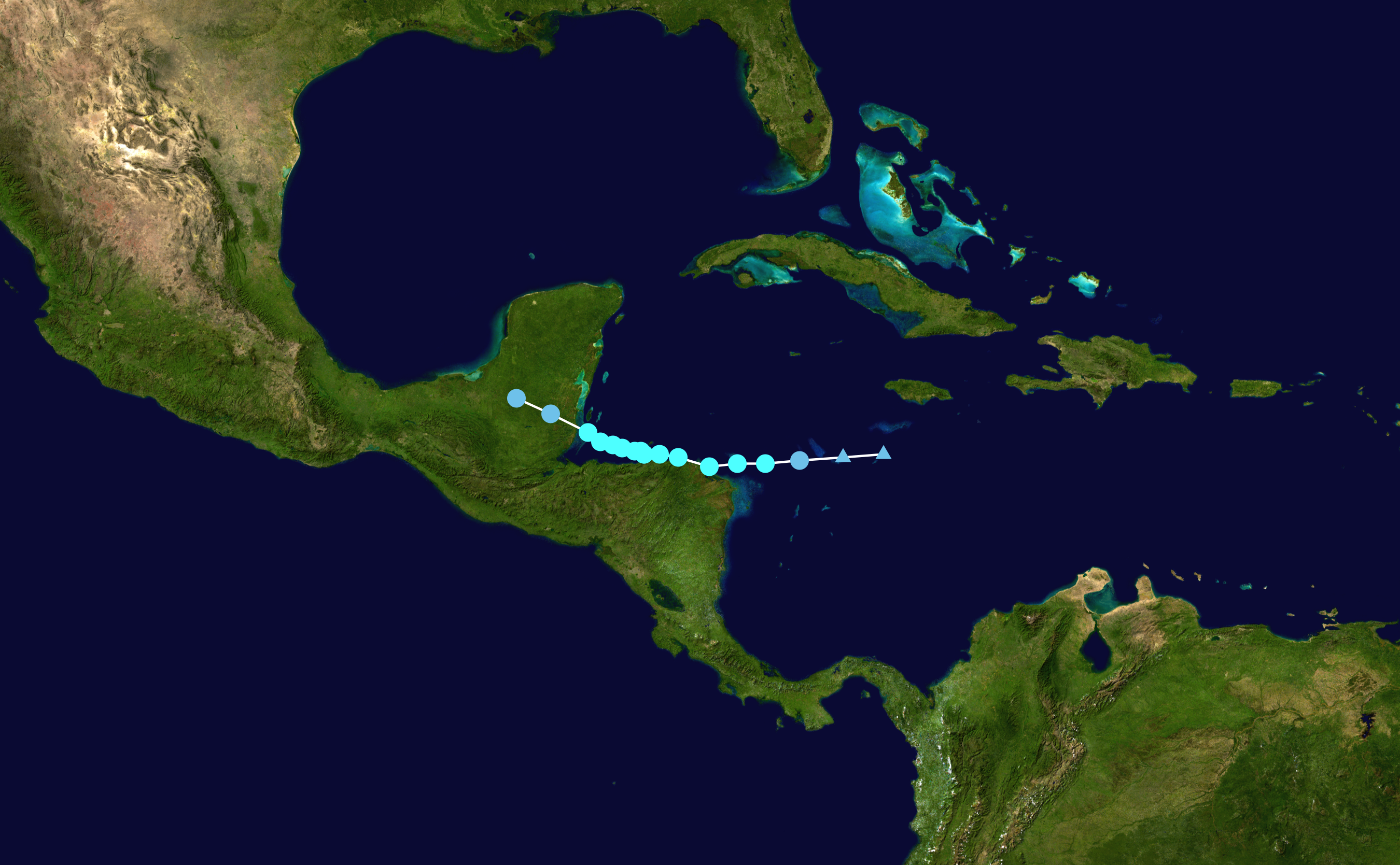
- Duration: November 14 – November 18
- Peak intensity: 50 mph (85 km/h) (1-min); 997 mbar (hPa)

On November 11, a large area of low pressure merged with a tropical wave south of Hispaniola over the central Caribbean Sea. The system moved generally westward and gradually organized over the next few days. Then, early on November 14, the system developed into Tropical Depression Nineteen about 150 mi (240 km) east of the Honduras-Nicaragua border. Later that day, an Air Force Reserve reconnaissance aircraft found maximum sustained winds of around 40 mph (65 km/h), indicating that the depression strengthened into Tropical Storm Sara. The cyclone then made landfall in Honduras near Punta Patuca early on November 15 but soon re-emerged into the Caribbean and strengthened further, peaking with winds of 50 mph (85 km/h) and a minimum pressure of 997 mbar (29.4 inHg) around 12:00 UTC. Sara then drifted generally west-northwestward, making landfall in Belize near Dangriga around 14:00 UTC on November 17. The cyclone weakened to a tropical depression about four hours later and dissipated early on November 18 over Campeche. After emerging into the Bay of Campeche, the remnants merged with a frontal system moving across the Southeastern United States within a few days.

The precursor disturbance of Sara caused flooding in the Dominican Republic, resulting in the evacuation of 1,767 people, isolating 54 communities, destroying 2 homes, and damaging 487 more. Two fishermen were left missing and were later found dead near Sabana de la Mar. Another person died in Haiti, where Sara's precursor damaged 3,554 dwellings in the Sud Department alone. Heavy rains in Nicaragua swelled rivers, inundated streets, generated at least a few landslides, and damaged approximately 1,800 homes. Two deaths occurred in the country. In Honduras, flooding and mudslides related to Sara damaged or destroyed thousands of homes, more than 120 roadways, 42 bridges, and 26 underpasses. Overall, Sara caused seven deaths and about $139 million in damage to agriculture and infrastructure. More than 1,000 residences were damaged in Guatemala. Flooding caused structural impacts to homes and buildings in Belize, especially the central and western parts of the country, with damage totaling $7.23 million.

=== Other system ===
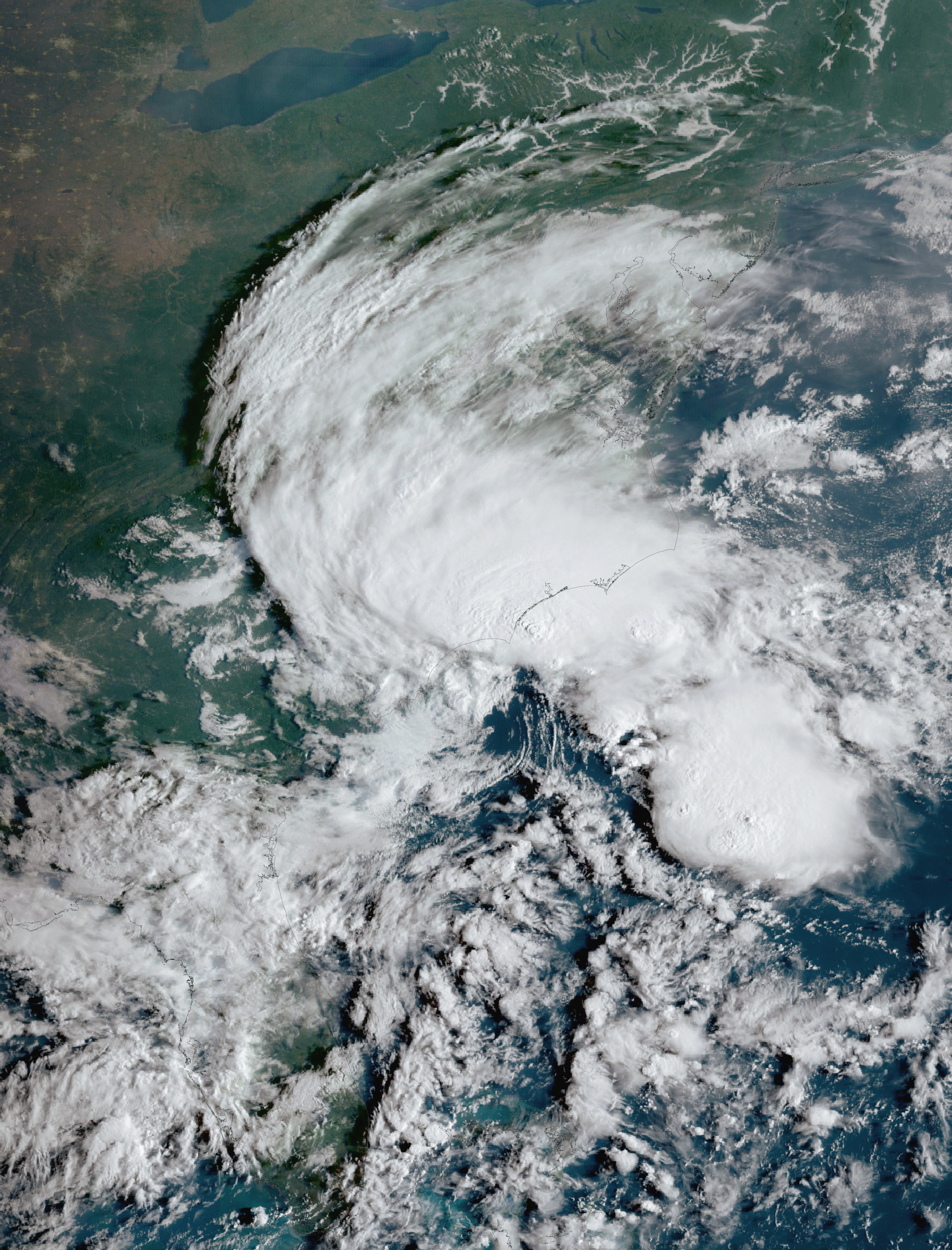
Potential Tropical Cyclone Eight off the coast of North Carolina on September 16

On September 11, the NHC noted an area with the potential of tropical cyclone development off the U.S. East Coast. An extratropical low with gale-force winds developed offshore early on September 15. The following day, an Air Force Hurricane Hunter aircraft found that the system possessed a broad low-level circulation center and was generating deep convection over and around the center. It also found that the system was in the process of separating from its frontal characteristics. Due to the increasing likelihood of the system gaining tropical characteristics and its proximity to coastal South Carolina, the NHC designated the system Potential Tropical Cyclone Eight at 21:00 UTC on September 15. Schools were closed in preparation for the storm. At 12:00 UTC on September 16, the system reached a peak of 60 mph (95 km/h) and 1,004 mbar (29.6 inHg) just offshore South Carolina. After failing to attain tropical characteristics while approaching northeastern South Carolina the following afternoon, sustained winds fell below tropical storm-force early the next day, and the system soon dissipated.

A tropical storm warning was issued at 21:00 UTC on September 15 from Edisto Beach, South Carolina, to Ocracoke Inlet, North Carolina. The NHC extended the warning to the South Santee River in South Carolina at 15:00 UTC on the following day, before discontinuing the warnings six hours later. The storm brought heavy rain to the Carolinas, especially at Carolina Beach, North Carolina, where rainfall totals reached 20.81 in (529 mm), and caused significant flooding in Brunswick County, North Carolina. In Sunny Point, North Carolina, winds gusted to 77 mph (124 km/h). Two tornadoes touched down during the storm. Several coastal roads, such as NC 12, were flooded with high tide. One person died after attempting to drive through floodwaters, while over 100 people required rescuing. More than 100 homes were damaged. According to Aon, total losses are estimated to be at $130 million as of January 2025, while the NHC noted other damage estimates ranging from $50–100 million.

== Storm names ==
The following list of names was used for named storms that formed in the North Atlantic in 2024. This is the same list used in the 2018 season, with the exceptions of Francine and Milton, which replaced Florence and Michael respectively. Both new names were used for the first (and only, in the case of Milton) time this season, as was Sara, which replaced Sandy after 2012, but went unused in 2018.

- Alberto
- Beryl
- Chris
- Debby
- Ernesto
- Francine
- Gordon
- Helene
- Isaac
- Joyce
- Kirk
- Leslie
- Milton
- Nadine
- Oscar
- Patty
- Rafael
- Sara
- Tony (unused)
- Valerie (unused)
- William (unused)

=== Retirement ===
On April 2, 2025, during the 47th Session of the RA IV Hurricane Committee, the World Meteorological Organization retired the names Beryl, Helene, and Milton from its rotating name lists due to the number of deaths and amount of damage each one caused, and they will not be used again in the North Atlantic basin. They were replaced with Brianna, Holly, (Note: The name Holly was used twice under previous naming conventions: in 1969, and in 1976.) and Miguel, respectively, which will first appear on the 2030 season list.

== Season effects ==
This is a table of all of the storms that formed in the 2024 Atlantic hurricane season. It includes their name, duration, peak classification and intensities, areas affected, damage, and death totals. Deaths in parentheses are additional and indirect (an example of an indirect death would be a traffic accident), but were still related to that storm. Damage and deaths include totals while the storm was extratropical, a wave, or a low, and all of the damage figures are in 2024 USD.

Saffir–Simpson scale
TD	TS	C1	C2	C3	C4	C5

2024 North Atlantic tropical cyclone season statistics
Storm name	Dates active	Storm category at peak intensity	Max 1-min wind mph (km/h)	Min. press. (mbar)	Areas affected	Damage (US$)	Deaths	Ref(s).
Alberto	June 19–20	Tropical storm	50 (85)	992	Yucatán Peninsula, Northeastern Mexico, Southern United States	$265 million	2 (4)	
Beryl	June 28 – July 9	Category 5 hurricane	165 (270)	932	Lesser Antilles, South America, Greater Antilles, Yucatán Peninsula, Gulf Coast of the United States, Eastern Canada	$9.05 billion	66 (7)	
Chris	June 30 – July 1	Tropical storm	45 (75)	1005	Yucatán Peninsula, Eastern Mexico	>$46.3 million	5 (1)	
Debby	August 3–8	Category 1 hurricane	80 (130)	979	Lucayan Archipelago, Greater Antilles, Gulf Coast, Eastern Canada, Western Europe	$4.25 billion	18	
Ernesto	August 12–20	Category 2 hurricane	100 (155)	967	Leeward Islands, Greater Antilles, Bermuda, Atlantic Canada, British Isles	$520 million	3	
Francine	September 9–12	Category 2 hurricane	105 (165)	972	Eastern Mexico, Gulf Coast of the United States	$1.3 billion	None	
Gordon	September 11–17	Tropical storm	45 (75)	1004	Cape Verde	None	None	
Helene	September 24–27	Category 4 hurricane	140 (220)	939	Cayman Islands, Central America, Yucatán Peninsula, Southeastern United States	>$78.7 billion	177 (75)	
Isaac	September 25–30	Category 2 hurricane	105 (165)	963	Bermuda	None	None	
Joyce	September 27–30	Tropical storm	50 (85)	1001	None	None	None	
Kirk	September 29 – October 7	Category 4 hurricane	150 (240)	928	Western Europe	$110 million	1	
Leslie	October 2–12	Category 2 hurricane	105 (165)	970	None	None	None	
Milton	October 5–10	Category 5 hurricane	180 (285)	895	Western Gulf Coast of Mexico, Yucatán Peninsula, Greater Antilles, Southeastern United States, The Bahamas	$34.4 billion	15 (27)	
Nadine	October 19–20	Tropical storm	60 (95)	1002	Belize, Guatemala, Honduras, Mexico	$255 million	13	
Oscar	October 19–22	Category 1 hurricane	85 (140)	984	Lucayan Archipelago, Cuba	$50 million	8	
Patty	November 1–4	Tropical storm	65 (100)	982 (Note: Patty reached its peak intensity of 65 mph (100 km/h) and 982 mbar as a subtropical storm but later became fully tropical. The peak intensity while fully tropical was 990 mbar.)	Azores	Minimal	None	
Rafael	November 4–10	Category 3 hurricane	120 (195)	954	Central America, South America, Greater Antilles	≥$1.35 billion	2 (6)	
Sara	November 14–18	Tropical storm	50 (85)	997	Central America, Yucatán Peninsula	$146.23 million	7 (5)	
Season aggregates
18 systems	June 19 – November 18		180 (285)	895		$131 billion	317 (125)	

== See also ==
- Weather of 2024
- Tropical cyclones in 2024
- 2024 Pacific hurricane season
- 2024 Pacific typhoon season
- 2024 North Indian Ocean cyclone season
- South-West Indian Ocean cyclone seasons: 2023–24, 2024–25
- Australian region cyclone seasons: 2023–24, 2024–25
- South Pacific cyclone seasons: 2023–24, 2024–25
- Misinformation about the 2024 Atlantic hurricane season
