= List of storms named Alberto =

The name Alberto has been used for eight tropical cyclones in the Atlantic Ocean:

- Hurricane Alberto (1982) – Category 1 hurricane that formed near Cuba, where it caused 23 deaths
- Tropical Storm Alberto (1988) – moved offshore up the east coast of the United States and crossed the Canadian Maritimes
- Tropical Storm Alberto (1994) – made landfall in Florida, continued over Georgia and Alabama, causing 30 deaths and $1.03 billion (1994 USD) damage
- Hurricane Alberto (2000) – long-lasting Category 3 hurricane in the Atlantic which did not approach land
- Tropical Storm Alberto (2006) – made landfall in the Florida Panhandle, causing minor damage and flooding up into the Carolinas
- Tropical Storm Alberto (2012) – stayed just offshore the Carolina coast, causing high surf
- Tropical Storm Alberto (2018) – made landfall in Florida causing 12 fatalities and heavy flooding
- Tropical Storm Alberto (2024) – made landfall in Tamaulipas causing localized flooding in parts of northeastern Mexico and into Texas and Louisiana
