= Tropical Storm Alberto (2024) =

Atlantic tropical storm in 2024

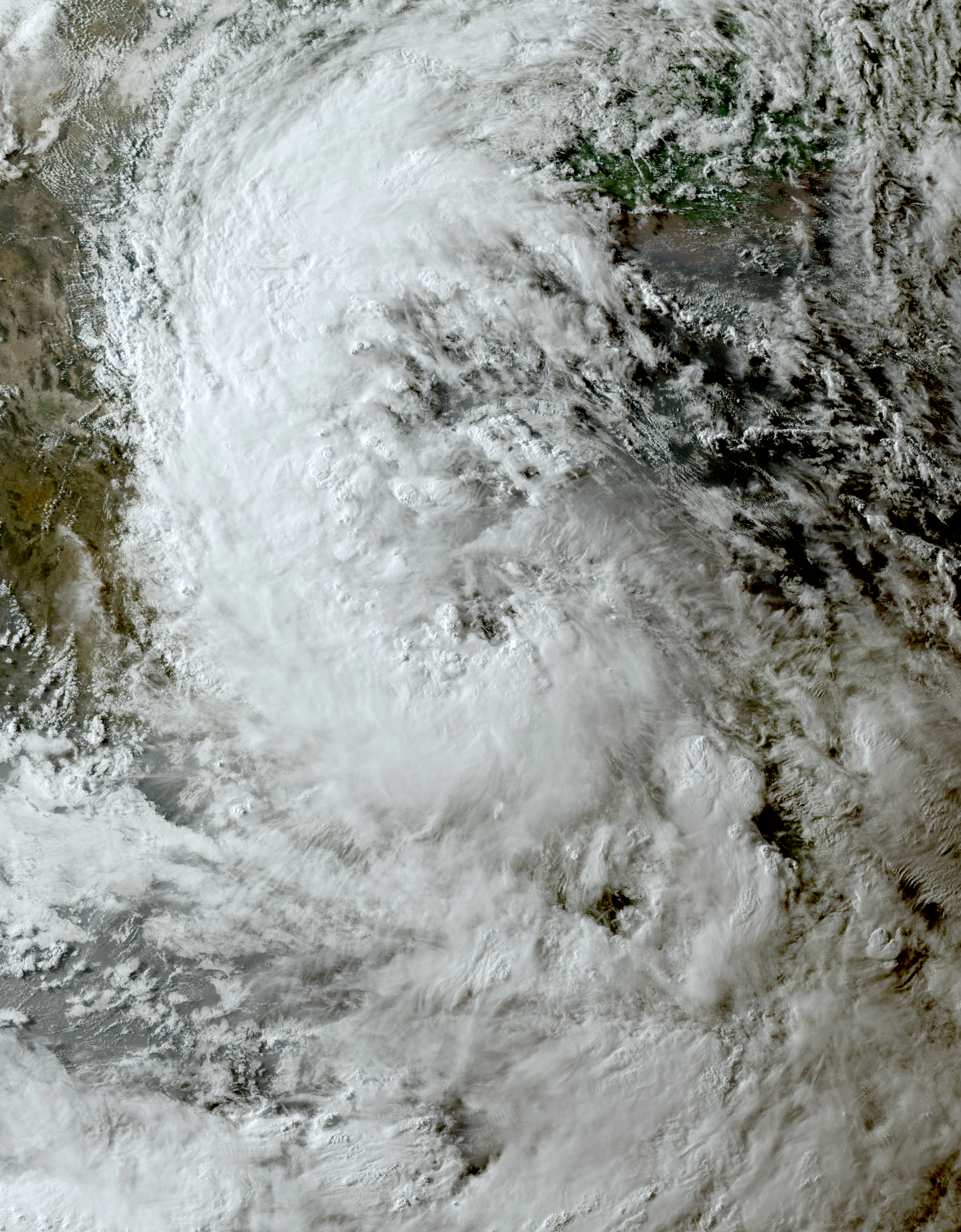
- Alberto at peak intensity in the western Gulf of Mexico on June 19

Meteorological history
- Formed: June 19, 2024
- Dissipated: June 20, 2024

Tropical storm
- 1-minute sustained (SSHWS/NWS)
- Highest winds: 50 mph (85 km/h)
- Lowest pressure: 992 mbar (hPa); 29.29 inHg

Overall effects
- Fatalities: 6 (2 direct, 4 indirect)
- Damage: $265 million (2024 USD)
- Areas affected: Yucatán Peninsula; Northeastern Mexico; Texas; Louisiana
- IBTrACS /
- Part of the 2024 Atlantic hurricane season

Tropical Storm Alberto was a broad but short-lived tropical cyclone that affected portions of Mexico and the U.S. states of Texas and Louisiana during June 2024. The first named storm of the extremely active 2024 Atlantic hurricane season, Alberto originated on June 12 from a broad area of disturbed weather resulting from a Central American Gyre feature that later developed into an area of low pressure in the Bay of Campeche. The disturbance was designated Potential Tropical Cyclone One by the National Hurricane Center on June 17. Two days later, the disturbance strengthened into a tropical storm and was assigned the name Alberto. The next day, Alberto peaked with sustained winds of 50 mph (80 km/h) before making landfall near Tampico, Tamaulipas. After landfall, Alberto rapidly weakened and dissipated nine hours after landfall on June 20.

Despite being weak, Alberto was unusually broad, affecting Texas, Louisiana, and northeastern Mexico throughout its lifetime. Alberto produced heavy flooding across Mexico and Texas, with Lamar, Texas, recording 10.5 in (267 mm) of rainfall. Three tornadoes were spawned by the storm, including an EF1 tornado near Bellville, Texas, that caused minor damage to a business and at least two homes. Six deaths occurred as a result of the storm — five in Nuevo León and one in Galveston, Texas. Alberto caused an estimated $265 million (2024 USD) in damage.

== Meteorological history ==
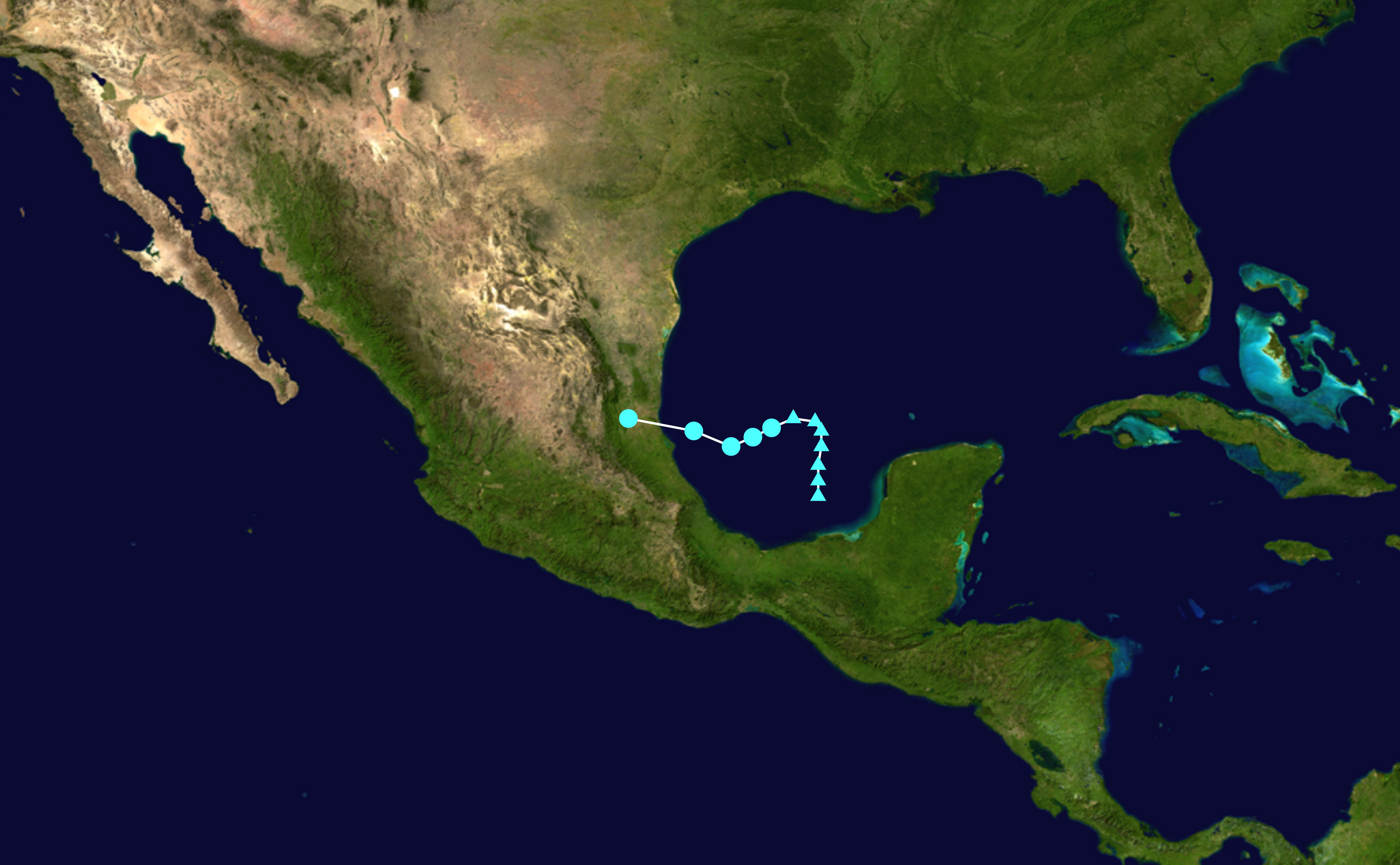
Map plotting the storm's track and intensity, according to the Saffir–Simpson scale Map key Saffir–Simpson scale Tropical depression (≤38 mph, ≤62 km/h) Tropical storm (39–73 mph, 63–118 km/h) Category 1 (74–95 mph, 119–153 km/h) Category 2 (96–110 mph, 154–177 km/h) Category 3 (111–129 mph, 178–208 km/h) Category 4 (130–156 mph, 209–251 km/h) Category 5 (≥157 mph, ≥252 km/h) Unknown Storm type Tropical cyclone Subtropical cyclone Extratropical cyclone, remnant low, tropical disturbance, or monsoon depression

The origins of Alberto can be traced back to the development of a Central American Gyre (CAG) feature – a broad low-pressure area centered over Central America – that the National Hurricane Center (NHC) first began to monitor for potential development on June 15. Two days later on June 17, the northern end of this feature emerged over the Bay of Campeche. The system slowly moved northward, and due to the threat of impacts to the Mexican coastline, it was designated Potential Tropical Cyclone One by the NHC later that day. At the time, the disturbance displayed a large area of gales to its north, enhanced by a pressure gradient due to a ridge of high pressure to its north over the Central United States, although thunderstorm activity was sparse around the ill-defined circulation.

The disturbance turned westward on June 19, and under favorable conditions, convection became more concentrated near the increasingly-defined center, leading to the designation of the system as Tropical Storm Alberto at 12:00 UTC that day while located approximately 205 mi (330 km) north of Tampico, Tamaulipas. Alberto steadily intensified and grew more organized throughout the day with its radius of maximum wind contracting slightly, ultimately attaining peak sustained winds of 50 mph (85 km/h) and a minimum central pressure of 992 mbar (29.29 inHg) at 00:00 UTC on June 20, accelerating slightly and making landfall nine hours later at 09:00 UTC in Tampico. The storm rapidly weakened over the rugged Mexican terrain, dissipating just nine hours after landfall.

== Preparations ==
Upon the designation of Alberto as a potential tropical cyclone at 21:00 UTC on June 17, a tropical storm watch was issued from Port O'Connor, Texas to Boca de Catán, Tamaulipas. Twelve hours later, the tropical storm watch was extended southward to Puerto de Altamira, Tamaulipas. Early on June 18, the portion of the tropical storm watch into Texas was upgraded to a tropical storm warning. About six hours later, the Mexican portion of the tropical storm watch was upgraded into a tropical storm warning. At 21:00 UTC that day, the tropical storm warning was extended northward to San Luis Pass, Texas. At 15:00 UTC on June 19, the tropical storm warning was extended southward to Tecolutla, Veracruz. These warnings were discontinued as Alberto moved inland at 15:00 UTC on June 20.

Ports in Tamaulipas, Veracruz, Quintana Roo, Tabasco, and Campeche were closed. In Tamaulipas, 333 shelters were opened.

In Texas, Governor Greg Abbott placed 51 counties under disaster declarations in advance of Alberto. The governor activated three Texas National Guard platoons, consisting of 40 members, 20 vehicles, and Chinook helicopters. Classes and camps at Del Mar College were cancelled, as well as summer classes in Alice and Orange Grove. The Corpus Christi Regional Transportation Authority, in coordination with the American Red Cross and the Corpus Christi Fire Department, offered voluntary evacuations on public buses at two collection stations. The Corpus Christi Fire Department also offered residents boat rides out of flooded areas. An American Airlines flight to Dallas and a United Airlines flight to Houston were delayed at the Corpus Christi International Airport. Amtrak's westbound Sunset Limited was cancelled between New Orleans, Louisiana, and San Antonio, Texas. The Salvation Army branch in McAllen opened their building as a public emergency shelter. Double red flags were hoisted at beaches in Brazoria County, signaling the closure of beaches to swimming. Beaches across Cameron County were also closed. Sandbags were used to protect unhatched sea turtle eggs in South Padre Island from rising water levels. A wind advisory was issued for parts of southeastern Louisiana.

== Impact ==
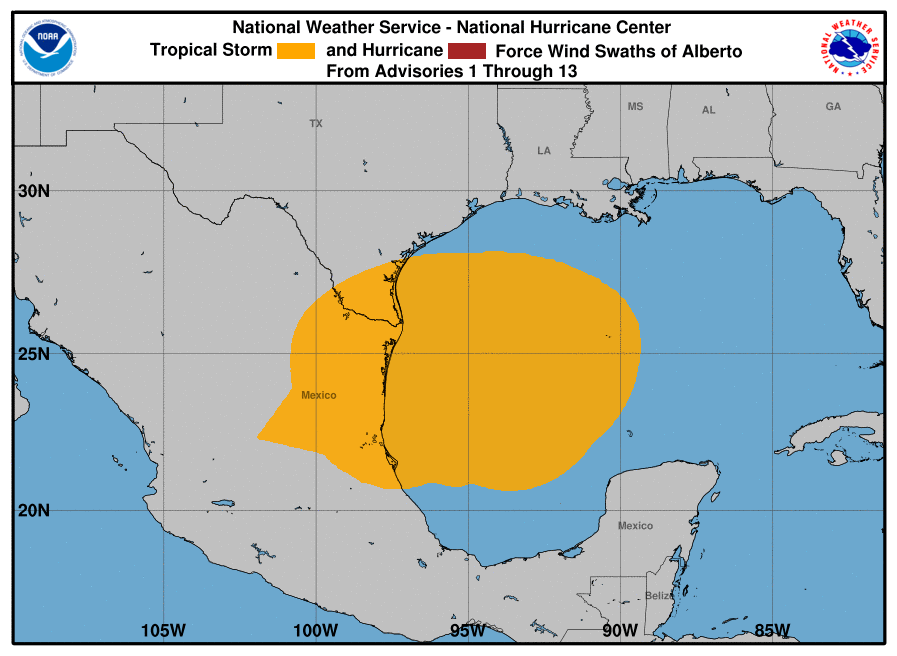
Wind field history of Alberto throughout its lifetime

=== Mexico ===
As of October 2024, according to AON, damages in Mexico are at US$140 million.

==== Nuevo León ====
Five deaths occurred in Nuevo León as a result of Alberto, all associated with flooding and storm-related hazards in the Monterrey metropolitan area. A 16-year-old drowned in Monterrey as a result of flooding, while two 12-year-old children and a man were electrocuted.

Alberto produced exceptionally heavy rainfall across the state. According to the National Water Commission (Conagua), average accumulated rainfall in Nuevo León during the storm reached approximately 11.1 in (282.6 mm). Rainfall totals peaked at 19.6 in (497 mm) at the La Boca reservoir station in Santiago, with additional maxima of 18.9 in (481 mm) in Santa Catarina and over 15.7 in (400 mm) at multiple stations in Monterrey. The heavy rainfall generated substantial inflows into regional reservoirs, significantly alleviating drought conditions. La Boca Dam in Santiago opened its floodgates on June 20 as it was filled to 104% capacity. El Cuchillo Dam in China increased from approximately 31.7% prior to Alberto to about 49.2% within a day of landfall, while Cerro Prieto Dam in Linares rose from roughly 5% to nearly 30% over the same period. By June 25, Conagua reported that El Cuchillo had reached approximately 85% capacity and Cerro Prieto about 58% due to continued inflows following the storm.

State authorities declared an emergency across the state following widespread flooding caused by Alberto. The Santa Catarina River overflowed, damaging adjacent road infrastructure. Floodwaters washed out a segment of Fed. 40 between Monterrey and Saltillo, Coahuila, while numerous additional roads and bridges across the state were damaged or rendered impassable. Flooding inundated more than 1,000 homes in Santiago, Santa Catarina, Zaragoza, Aramberri, Galeana, and Iturbide. Landslides and continued runoff further hindered access to affected areas, while Civil Protection of Nuevo Leon reported nearly 1,987 emergency responses, including rescue and evacuation operations; government-operated shelters housed dozens of displaced residents in the immediate aftermath of the storm.

==== Elsewhere ====
In Xalapa, Veracruz, 24 people were left homeless after days of flooding caused three buildings to collapse.

=== United States ===
==== Texas ====
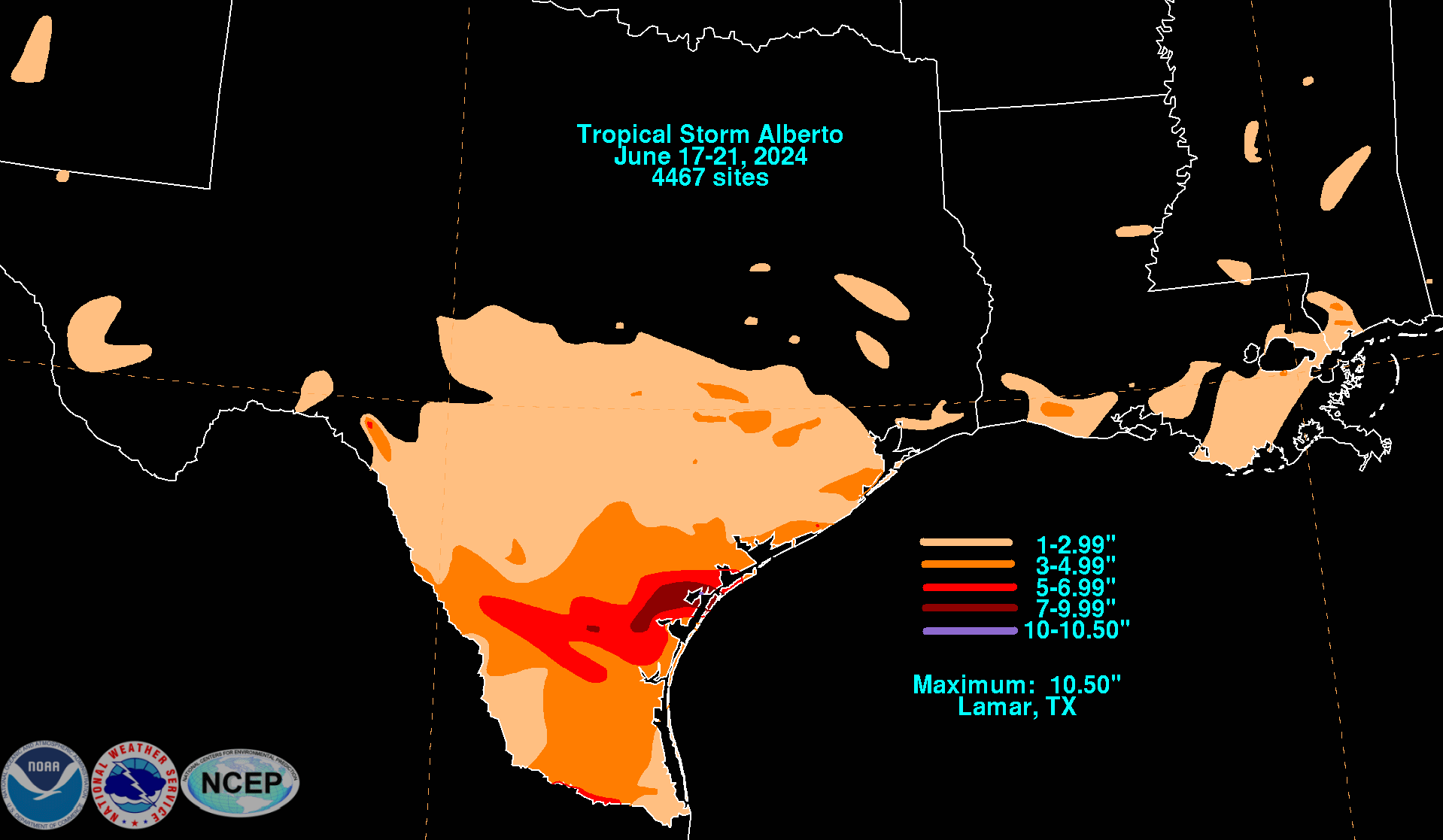
Rainfall map over the US as a result of Alberto

Alberto produced heavy rainfall over Texas, mainly over the southern part of the state. Precipitation accumulations peaked at 10.5 in (267 mm) in Lamar. Tropical storm force winds were measured at several locations in Texas. A sustained wind of 54 mph (87 km/h) was observed at a maritime weather station on Baffin Bay. Over land, a wind speed of 47 mph (76 km/h) was observed on Padre Island within Kleberg County. Increased tides also occurred in Texas, peaking at 4.05 ft (1.2 m) at San Luis Pass. Storm surge in Galveston reached a height of 4 ft (1.2 m), marking the city's seventh-highest water level on record.

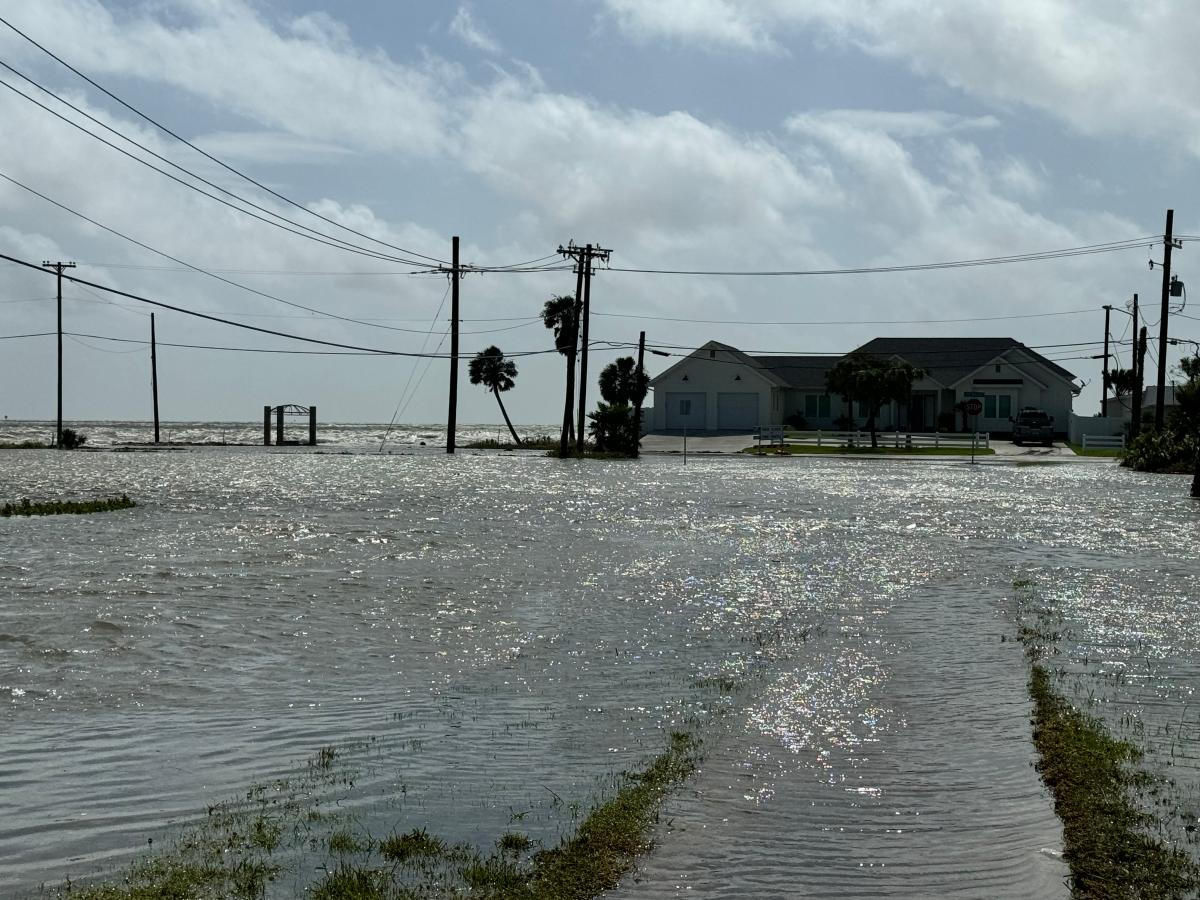
Flooding due to Alberto in Fulton, Texas

Alberto brought significant rainfall to the Galveston area, leading to freshwater flooding. Its winds caused a 2–4 feet (0.6–1 m) storm surge, inundating coastal communities between Galveston and Freeport. One person drowned at Galveston due to rip currents generated by the storm. South of there, between Portland and Gregory, US 181 was temporarily shut down due to downed power lines. Also, near Port Aransas, Mustang Island State Park was closed for storm debris cleanup, as was the USS Lexington Museum in North Beach, Corpus Christi. A sinkhole produced by the storm destabilized the foundation of a home on Padre Island. Several creeks overflowed their banks in Jim Wells County, resulting in flooding in the communities of Alice and Alfred. Additionally, an EF1 tornado touched down near Bellville, causing some property damage along its 2 mi (3.2 km) long path, and two EF0 tornadoes occurred near Rockport. Initially, Alberto was expected to relieve a three-year drought plaguing South Texas. However, soil absorbed most of the rainfall produced by the storm, allowing much less to runoff into reservoirs. A 5% increase in water levels was observed by drought monitors in the area nonetheless. Damage in Texas is estimated to be at US$125 million.

==== Elsewhere ====
Due to tides associated with Alberto, parts of Louisiana were placed under a coastal flood warning. Tides reached a maximum level of 2.91 ft (0.89 m) at the Freshwater Canal Lock observation station. Roads in Calcasieu, Cameron and St. Bernard parishes were closed due to flooding. Tropical storm force wind gusts impacted parts of Louisiana, peaking at 41 mph (66 km/h) at the Lake Charles Regional Airport. Rainfall totals of up to 4.69 in (119.12 mm) were observed at Catfish Point. Storm surge also left several roads impassable in Hancock County, Mississippi. Double red flags were raised in Dauphin Island, Alabama, warning beachgoers to remain out of the water. Waves up to 5 ft (1.5 m) in height inundated Bienville Boulevard.

=== Tornadoes ===
List of confirmed tornadoes – Wednesday, June 19, 2024 (Note: All dates are based on the local time zone where the tornado touched down; however, all times are in Coordinated Universal Time for consistency.)
| EF# | Location | County / Parish | State | Start Coord. | Time (UTC) | Path length | Max width |
|---|---|---|---|---|---|---|---|
| EF0 | NW of Rockport | Aransas | TX | 28.0404°N 97.0835°W | 21:49–21:51 | 0.28 mi (0.45 km) | 50 yd (46 m) |
| EF0 | A shed was overturned. Trees and two carports were damaged. | | | | | | |
| EF1 | NW of Bellville | Austin | TX | 29.9698°N 96.2826°W | 22:25–22:27 | 1.9 mi (3.1 km) | 100 yd (91 m) |
| EF1 | One business lost its metal roof and at least two homes were damaged by wind, trees, and debris. Numerous trees were uprooted and snapped. A portion of the path on private property could not be surveyed; the path may have been longer. | | | | | | |
| EF0 | SSW of Fulton | Aransas | TX | 28.0509°N 97.0381°W | 23:43–23:44 | 0.2 mi (0.32 km) | 40 yd (37 m) |
| EF0 | A waterspout came ashore causing a home to lose a few shingles. Some tree limbs were broken and a dying palm tree was snapped. | | | | | | |

== See also ==
- List of storms named Alberto
- Tropical cyclones in 2024
- Weather of 2024
- Timeline of the 2024 Atlantic hurricane season
- List of Mexico hurricanes
