= Timeline of the 2024 Atlantic hurricane season =

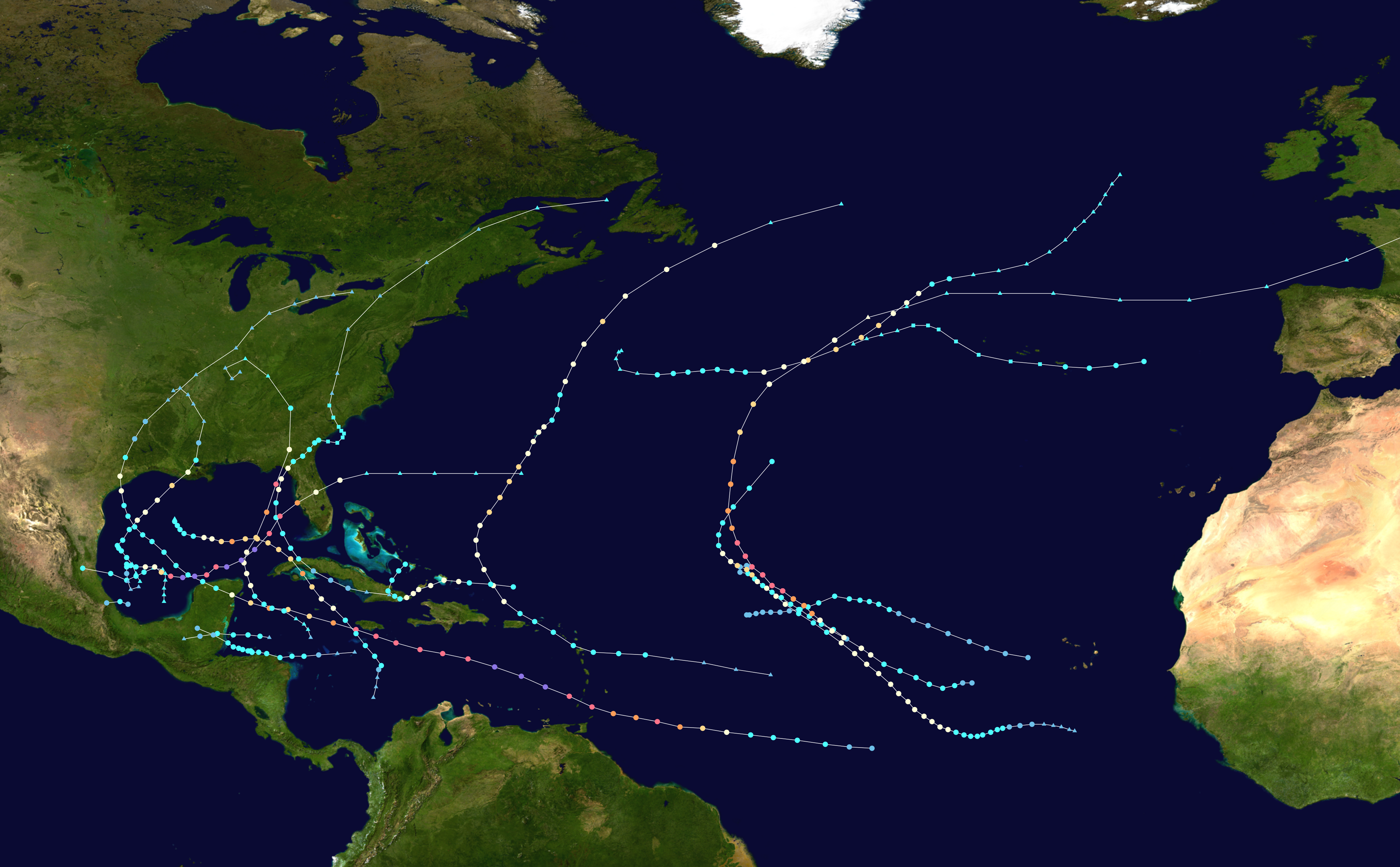
- Season summary map

Season boundaries
- First system formed: June 19, 2024
- Last system dissipated: November 18, 2024

Strongest system
- Name: Milton
- Maximum winds: 180 mph (285 km/h) (1-minute sustained)
- Lowest pressure: 895 mbar (hPa; 26.43 inHg)

Longest lasting system
- Name: Beryl
- Duration: 11.5 days
Storm articles
- Tropical Storm Alberto (2024)
- Hurricane Beryl
- Tropical Storm Chris (2024)
- Hurricane Debby
- Hurricane Ernesto (2024)
- Hurricane Francine
- Hurricane Helene
- Hurricane Kirk (2024)
- Hurricane Milton
- Tropical Storm Nadine (2024)
- Hurricane Oscar (2024)
- Hurricane Rafael
- Tropical Storm Sara

The 2024 Atlantic hurricane season was the annual cycle of tropical cyclone formation over the Atlantic Ocean north of the equator. The season officially began on June 1 and ended on November 30. This is historically the period during which most subtropical or tropical cyclogenesis occurs over the Atlantic Ocean. The first system, Tropical Storm Alberto, formed on June 19; the final system, Tropical Storm Sara, dissipated on November 18.

Activity during the season was above average, as defined by the National Hurricane Center (NHC), (Note: An average Atlantic hurricane season, as defined by the National Hurricane Center, has 14 tropical storms, 7 hurricanes and 3 major hurricanes.) with 18 named storms developing; of them, 11 became hurricanes, and 5 strengthened further to become major hurricanes. (Note: A major hurricane is a hurricane that reaches Category 3 or higher on the five-level Saffir–Simpson scale, with 1-minute sustained winds higher than 110 miles per hour (178 km/h).) Among the systems making landfall during the season, four did so at major hurricane strength. Beryl devastated the islands of Carriacou and Petite Martinique in Grenada. In September, Helene cut a destructive path through the Southeastern United States and the central Appalachian Mountains. The following month, Milton made landfall in Florida, causing severe damage. Then, in November, Rafael made landfall in Artemisa, Cuba.

This timeline documents tropical cyclone formations, strengthening, weakening, landfalls, extratropical transitions, and dissipations during the season. It includes information that was not released during the season, meaning that data from post-storm NHC reviews has been included.

The time stamp for each event is first stated using Coordinated Universal Time (UTC), the 24-hour clock where 00:00 = midnight UTC. The NHC uses both UTC and the time zone where the center of the tropical cyclone is currently located. The time zones utilized (east to west) are: Greenwich, Cape Verde, Atlantic, Eastern, and Central. In this timeline, the respective area time is included in parentheses. Additionally, figures for maximum sustained winds and position estimates are rounded to the nearest 5 units (miles or kilometers), following National Hurricane Center practice. Direct wind observations are rounded to the nearest whole number. Atmospheric pressures are listed to the nearest millibar and nearest hundredth of an inch of mercury.

== Timeline of events ==
=== June ===
June 1

- The 2024 Atlantic hurricane season officially begins.

June 19

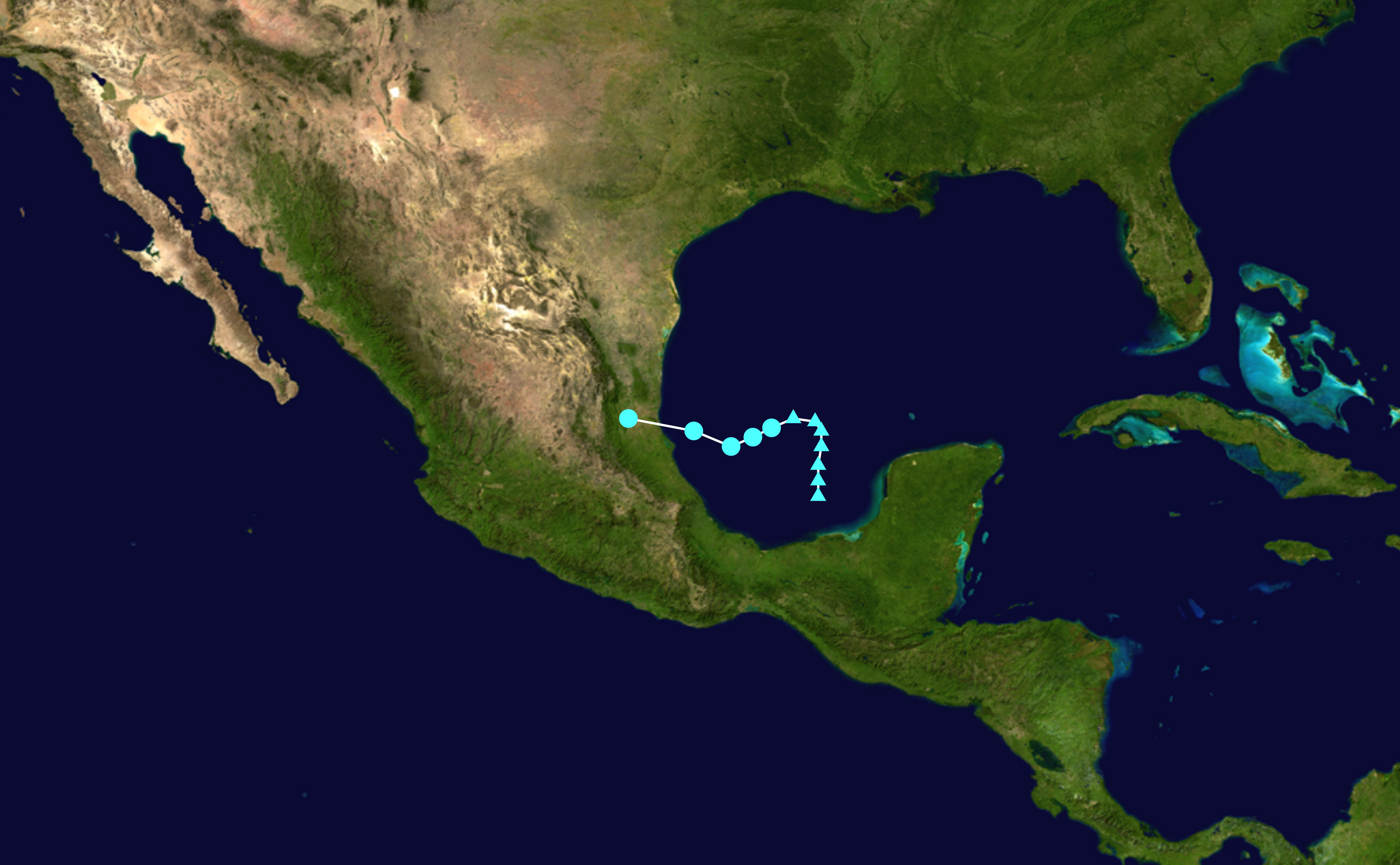
Storm path of Tropical Storm Alberto

- 12:00 UTC (7:00 a.m. CDT) at 22.1°N 94.2°W – Tropical Storm Alberto forms from a Central American gyre about 235 mi (380 km) east of Tampico, Tamaulipas. (Note: Due to the threat the developing system posed to northeastern Mexico and South Texas, the National Hurricane Center initiated advisories on it, designating it Potential Tropical Cyclone One at 21:00 UTC (4:00 p.m. CDT) on June 17.)

June 20

- 00:00 UTC (7:00 p.m. CDT, June 19) at 21.5°N 95.5°W – Tropical Storm Alberto attains its peak intensity, with maximum sustained winds of 50 mph (85 km/h) and a minimum central pressure of 992 mbar (29.29 inHg).
- 09:00 UTC (4:00 a.m. CDT) at 22.4°N 97.8°W – Tropical Storm Alberto makes landfall near Tampico with maximum sustained winds of 50 mph (85 km/h) and a minimum central pressure of 994 mbar (29.35 inHg), and dissipates later that day inland over mountainous terrain.

June 28

- 12:00 UTC (8:00 a.m. AST) at 8.9°N 39.6°W – A tropical depression forms from a tropical wave about 1,380 mi (2,220 km) east of Barbados.

June 29

- 00:00 UTC (8:00 p.m. AST, June 28) at 9.2°N 43.1°W – The recently formed tropical depression strengthens into Tropical Storm Beryl about 1,145 mi (1,845 km) east-southeast of Barbados.

June 30

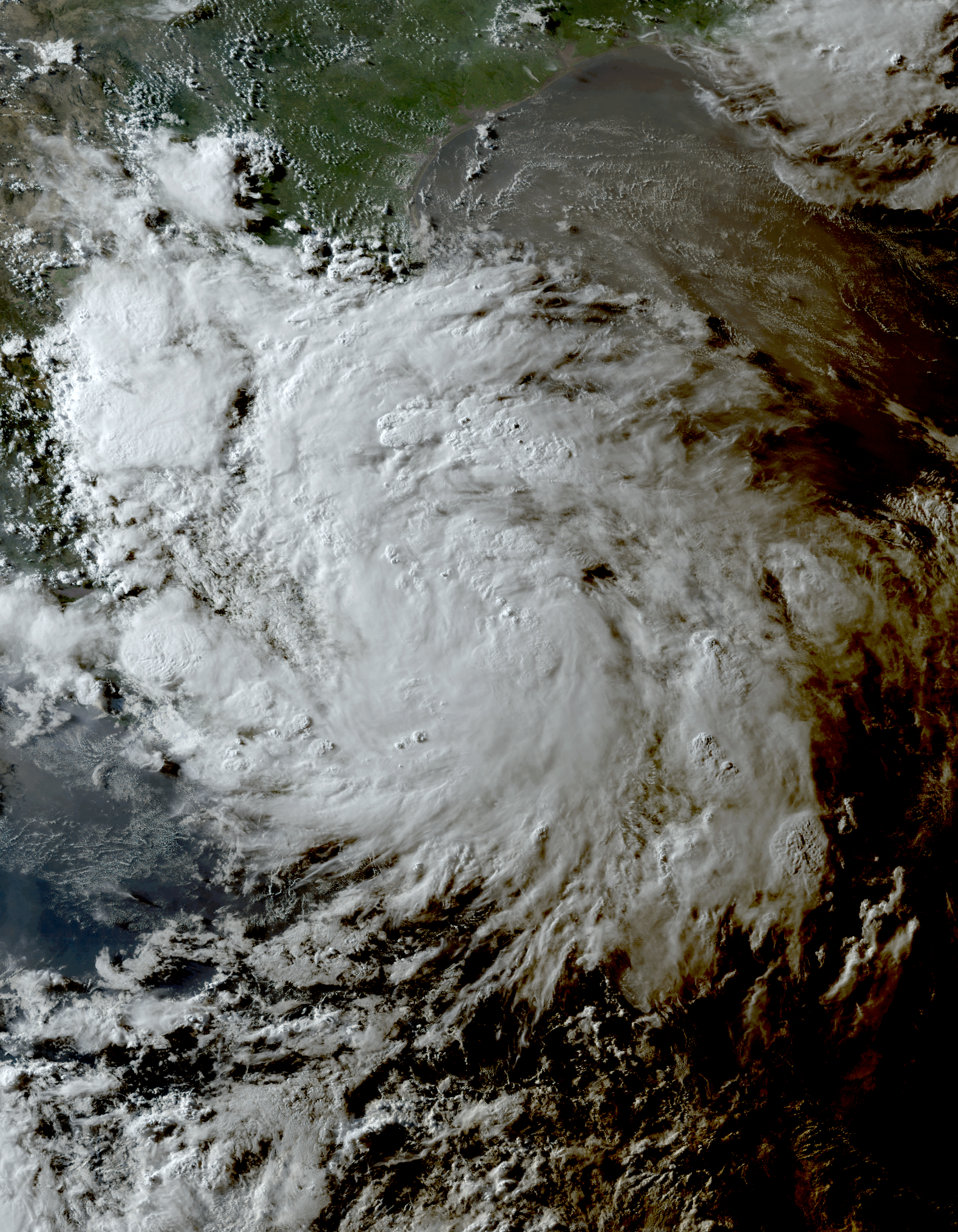
Tropical Storm Chris approaching Veracruz on July 1

- 00:00 UTC (8:00 p.m. AST, June 29) at 10.1°N 50.5°W – Tropical Storm Beryl strengthens into a Category 1 hurricane on the Saffir–Simpson scale about 650 mi (1,045 km) east-southeast of Barbados.
- 06:00 UTC (2:00 a.m. AST) at 10.4°N 52.3°W – Hurricane Beryl intensifies to Category 2 strength about 525 mi (845 km) east-southeast of Barbados.
- 12:00 UTC (8:00 a.m. AST) at 10.5°N 54.0°W – Hurricane Beryl intensifies to Category 3 strength about 420 mi (675 km) east-southeast of Barbados.
- 18:00 UTC (2:00 p.m. AST) at 10.9°N 55.7°W – Hurricane Beryl intensifies to Category 4 strength about 300 mi (480 km) east-southeast of Barbados. It simultaneously attains its initial peak intensity, with maximum sustained winds of 130 mph (215 km/h) and a minimum central pressure of 958 mbar (28.29 inHg).
- 18:00 UTC (1:00 p.m. CDT) at 19.7°N 95.4°W – A tropical depression forms from a tropical wave about 65 mi (100 km) northeast of the city of Veracruz.

=== July ===
July 1

- 00:00 UTC (8:00 p.m. AST, June 30) at 11.2°N 57.3°W – Hurricane Beryl weakens to Category 3 strength about 200 mi (325 km) southeast of Barbados.
- 00:00 UTC (7:00 p.m. CDT, June 30) at 19.9°N 96.0°W – The recently formed tropical depression strengthens into Tropical Storm Chris as it nears the coast of Veracruz.
- 03:00 UTC (10:00 p.m. CDT, June 30) at 19.9°N 96.5°W – Tropical Storm Chris makes landfall in the municipality of Alto Lucero; it simultaneously attains its peak intensity, with maximum sustained winds of 45 mph (75 km/h) and a minimum central pressure of 1,005 mbar (29.68 inHg).
- 06:00 UTC (1:00 a.m. CDT) at 19.8°N 97.0°W – Tropical Storm Chris weakens to a tropical depression inland and dissipates several hours later.
- 12:00 UTC (8:00 a.m. AST) at 12.0°N 60.6°W – Hurricane Beryl re-intensifies to Category 4 strength about 65 mi (100 km) east-southeast of the Grenadine island of Carriacou.
- 15:20 UTC (11:20 a.m. AST) at 12.5°N 61.5°W – Hurricane Beryl makes its first landfall on Carriacou with maximum sustained winds of 140 mph (220 km/h) and a minimum central pressure of 950 mbar (28.05 inHg).

July 2

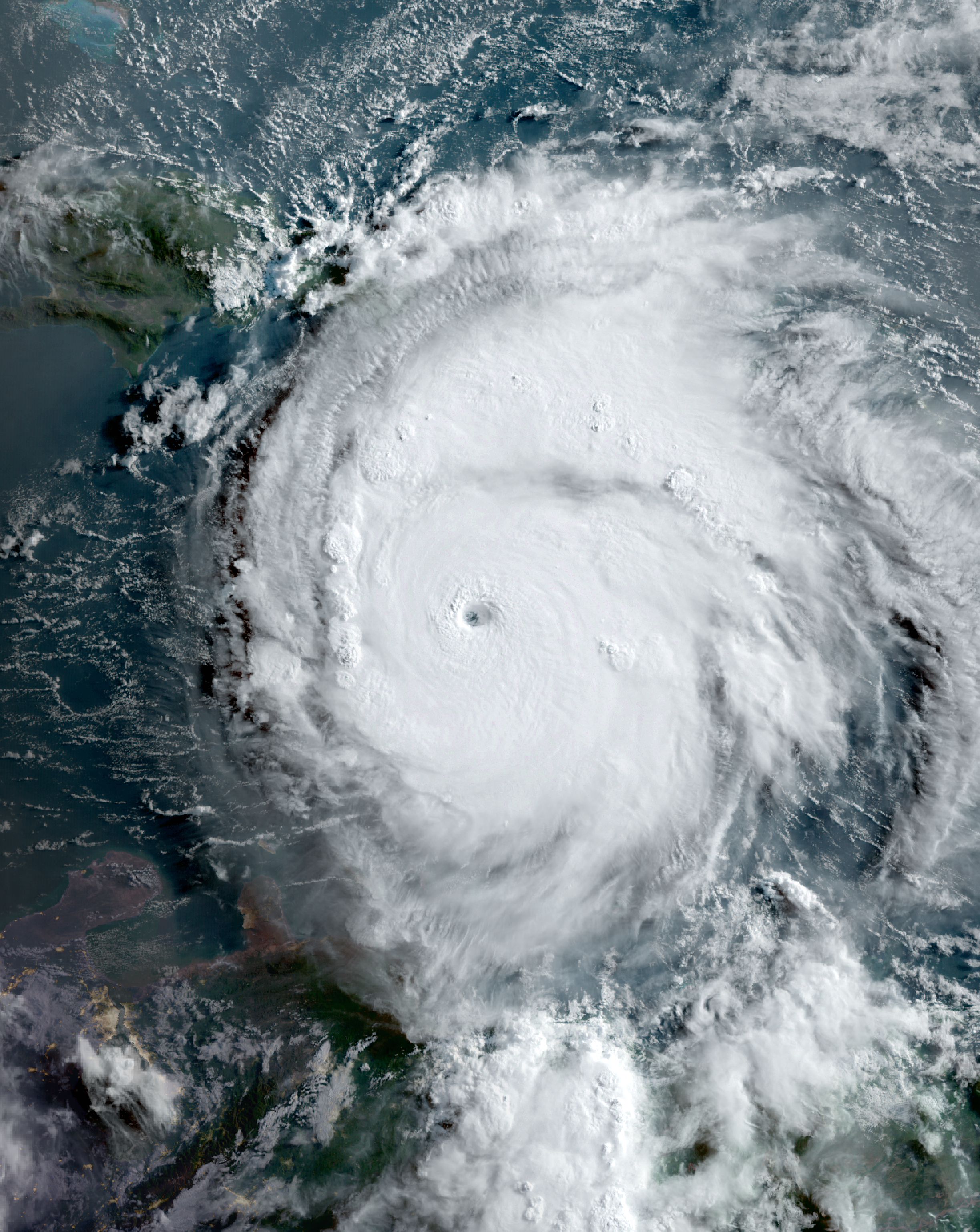
Hurricane Beryl near peak intensity on July 2

- 00:00 UTC (8:00 p.m. AST, July 1) at 13.5°N 64.1°W – Hurricane Beryl intensifies to Category 5 strength offshore, about 190 mi (305 km) west-northwest of Carriacou.
- 09:45 UTC (5:45 a.m. AST) at 14.8°N 67.2°W – Hurricane Beryl attains its peak intensity, with maximum sustained winds of 165 mph (270 km/h) and a minimum central pressure of 932 mbar (27.52 inHg), about 305 mi (490 km) southeast of the Punta Palenque Lighthouse in the Dominican Republic.
- 18:00 UTC (2:00 p.m. AST) at 15.6°N 69.9°W – Hurricane Beryl weakens to Category 4 strength about 185 mi (295 km) south of the Punta Palenque Lighthouse.

July 4

- 06:00 UTC (2:00 a.m. EDT) at 18.3°N 80.0°W – Hurricane Beryl weakens to Category 3 strength about 110 mi (175 km) southeast of Grand Cayman.
- 12:00 UTC (8:00 a.m. EDT) at 18.8°N 81.8°W – Hurricane Beryl weakens to Category 2 strength about 50 mi (85 km) southwest of Grand Cayman.

July 5

- 00:00 UTC (8:00 p.m. EDT, July 4) at 19.6°N 85.1°W – Hurricane Beryl re-intensifies to Category 3 strength about 185 mi (295 km) east-southeast of Tulum, Quintana Roo.
- 06:00 UTC (1:00 a.m. CDT) at 19.8°N 86.2°W – Hurricane Beryl weakens to Category 2 strength about 85 mi (140 km) east-southeast of Tulum.
- 11:00 UTC (6:00 a.m. CDT) at 20.3°N 87.4°W – Hurricane Beryl weakens to Category 1 strength as it makes its second landfall just northeast of Tulum with maximum sustained winds of 90 mph (150 km/h) and a minimum central pressure of 977 mbar (28.85 inHg).
- 18:00 UTC (1:00 p.m. CDT) at 20.9°N 88.8°W – Hurricane Beryl weakens into a tropical storm inland, about 65 mi (100 km) east-southeast of Progreso, Yucatán.

July 8

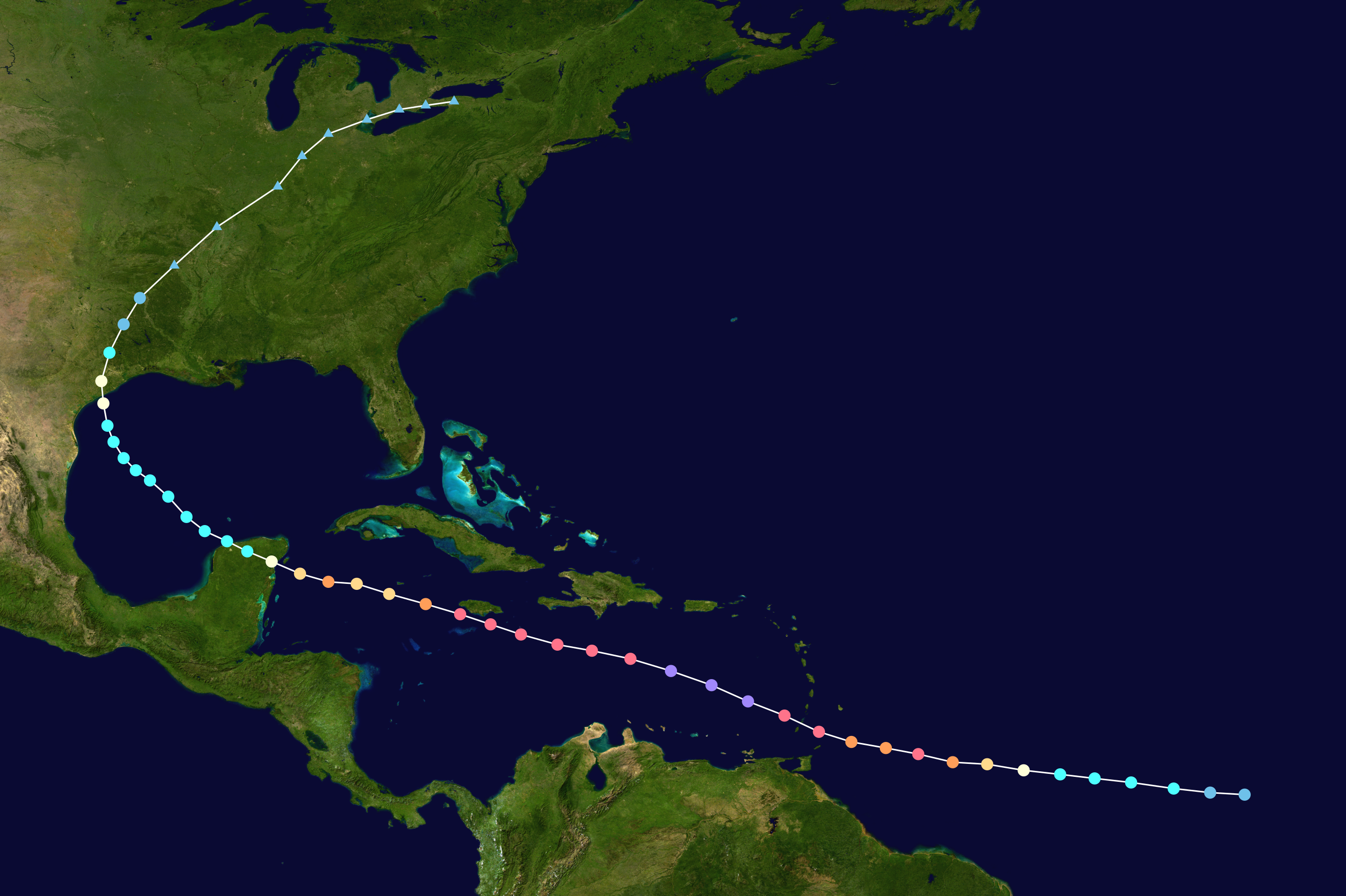
Storm path of Hurricane Beryl

- 04:00 UTC (11:00 p.m. CDT, July 7) at 28.2°N 95.9°W (Note: The position is as of 06:00 UTC (1:00 a.m. CDT) on July 8.) – Tropical Storm Beryl re-strengthens into a Category 1 hurricane offshore, as it approaches the coast of Texas.
- 08:40 UTC (3:40 a.m. CDT) at 28.6°N 96.0°W – Hurricane Beryl makes its third and final landfall near Matagorda, Texas, with maximum sustained winds of 90 mph (150 km/h) and a minimum central pressure of 978 mbar (28.88 inHg).
- 18:00 UTC (1:00 p.m. CDT) at 30.7°N 95.6°W – Hurricane Beryl weakens into a tropical storm inland, about 65 mi (100 km) north of Houston, Texas.

July 9

- 00:00 UTC (7:00 p.m. CDT, July 8) at 32.1°N 94.9°W – Tropical Storm Beryl weakens into a tropical depression inland, about 160 mi (260 km) north of Houston.
- 12:00 UTC (7:00 a.m. CDT) at 35.0°N 92.4°W – Tropical Depression Beryl transitions into an extratropical cyclone inland over Central Arkansas, and is later absorbed by a weather front over upstate New York.

=== August ===
August 3

- 00:00 UTC (8:00 p.m. EDT, August 2) at 20.9°N 78.9°W – A tropical depression forms from a tropical wave about 75 mi (120 km) west-southwest of Camagüey, Cuba, and subsequently makes two landfalls over western Cuba. (Note: Due to the threat the developing system posed to Florida, the National Hurricane Center initiated advisories on it, designating it Potential Tropical Cyclone Four at 15:00 UTC (11:00 a.m. EDT) on August 2.)
- 18:00 UTC (2:00 p.m. EDT) at 23.1°N 82.6°W – After emerging over the southeastern Gulf of Mexico, the recently formed tropical depression strengthens into Tropical Storm Debby about 115 mi (185 km) south-southwest of Key West, Florida.

August 5

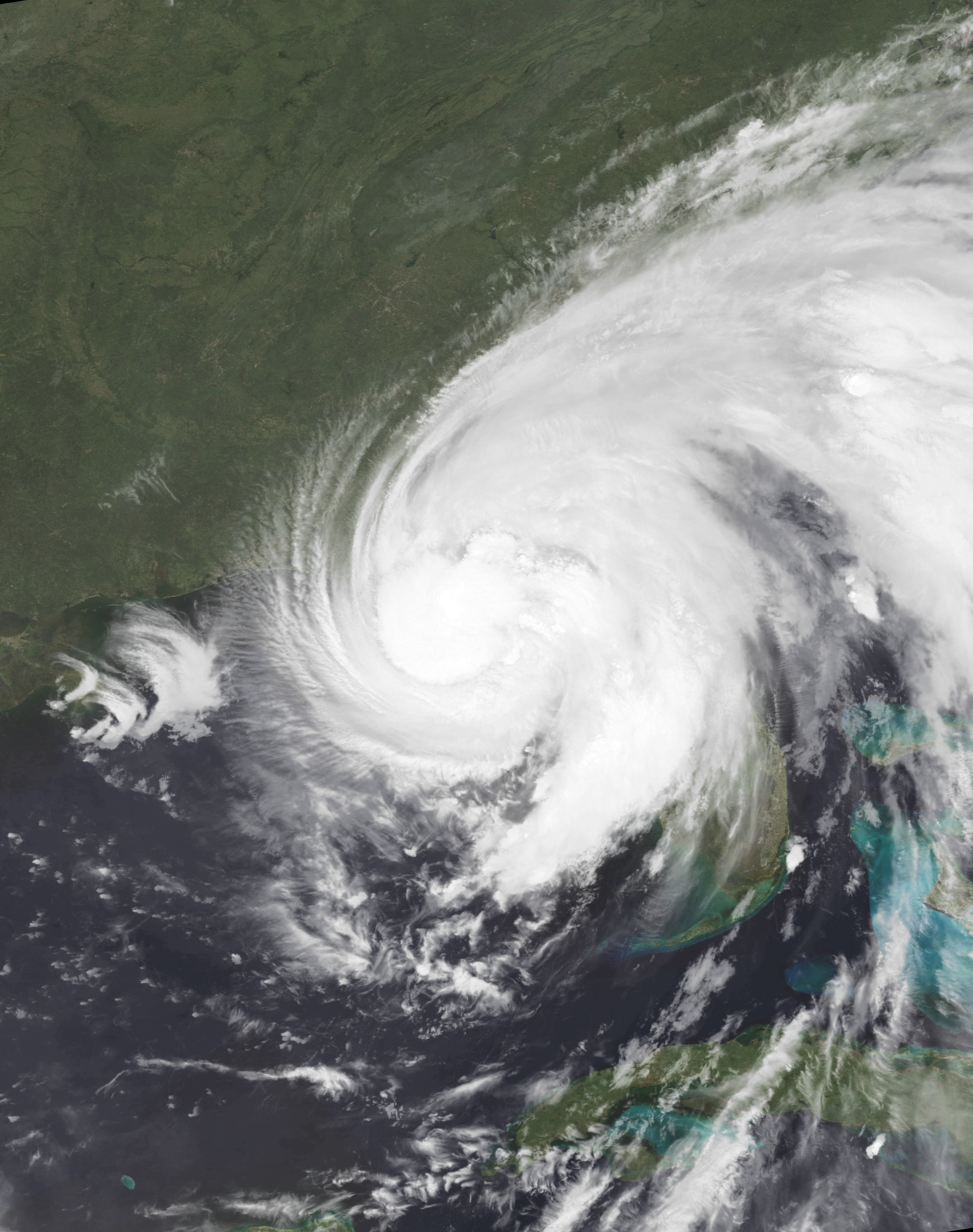
Hurricane Debby approaching landfall in Florida on August 5

- 00:00 UTC (8:00 p.m. EDT, August 4) at 28.3°N 84.1°W – Tropical Storm Debby strengthens into a Category 1 hurricane about 105 mi (165 km) west-northwest of Tampa, Florida.
- 11:00 UTC (7:00 a.m. EDT) at 29.7°N 83.5°W – Hurricane Debby attains its peak intensity, with maximum sustained winds of 80 mph (130 km/h) and a minimum central pressure of 979 mbar (28.91 inHg), as it makes its third landfall near Steinhatchee, Florida.
- 18:00 UTC (2:00 p.m. EDT) at 30.4°N 83.0°W – Hurricane Debby weakens into a tropical storm inland, about 60 mi (95 km) north-northeast of Steinhatchee.

August 7

- 00:00 UTC (8:00 p.m. EDT, August 6) at 31.9°N 80.4°W – Tropical Storm Debby transitions into a subtropical storm offshore, about 40 mi (65 km) east-southeast of Savannah.
- 12:00 UTC (8:00 a.m. EDT) at 32.2°N 79.3°W – Subtropical Storm Debby attains its secondary peak intensity, with maximum sustained winds of 60 mph (95 km/h) and a minimum central pressure of 994 mbar (29.35 inHg), about 60 mi (95 km) southeast of Charleston, South Carolina.

August 8

- 06:00 UTC (2:00 a.m. EDT) at 33.0°N 79.6°W – Subtropical Storm Debby makes its fourth and final landfall near Bulls Bay, South Carolina, with maximum sustained winds of 45 miles per hour (75 km/h) and a minimum central pressure of 995 mbar (29.38 inHg).

August 9

- 00:00 UTC (8:00 p.m. EDT, August 8) at 35.5°N 80.1°W – Subtropical Storm Debby weakens below gale force and transitions into an extratropical cyclone inland over central North Carolina, and is later absorbed by a weather front over the Gulf of St. Lawrence.

August 12

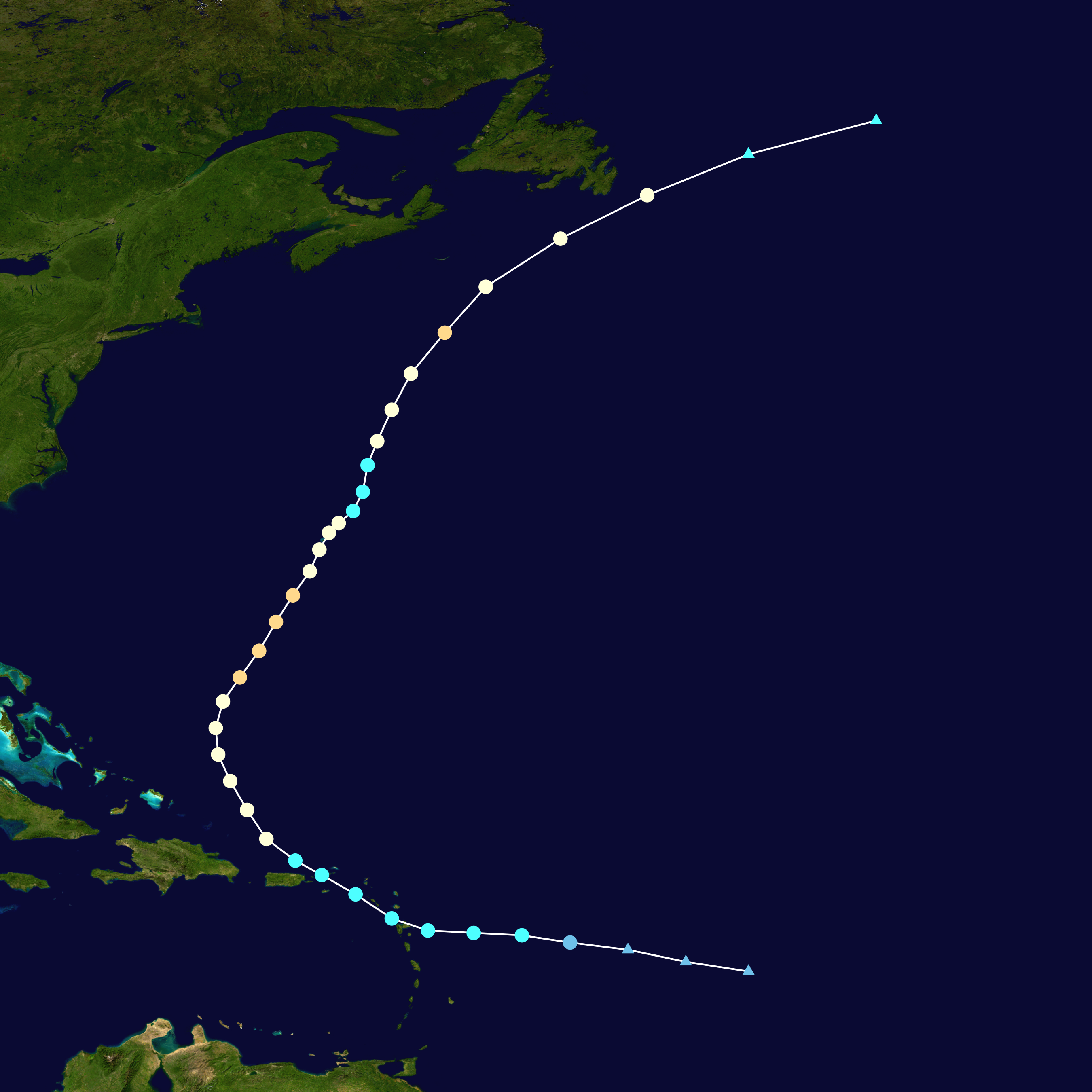
Storm path of Hurricane Ernesto

- 12:00 UTC (8:00 a.m. AST) at 15.6°N 54.6°W – A tropical depression forms from a tropical wave about 460 mi (740 km) east of the island of Guadeloupe. (Note: Due to the threat the developing system posed to the Leeward Islands, the National Hurricane Center initiated advisories on it, designating it Potential Tropical Cyclone Five at 21:00 UTC (5:00 p.m. AST) on August 11.)
- 18:00 UTC (2:00 p.m. AST) at 15.9°N 56.6°W – The recently formed tropical depression strengthens into Tropical Storm Ernesto about 330 mi (530 km) east of Guadeloupe.

August 13

- 09:40 UTC (5:40 a.m. AST) at 16.4°N 61.4°W – Tropical Storm Ernesto makes its first landfall on Guadeloupe with maximum sustained winds of 40 mph (65 km/h) and a minimum central pressure of 1007 mbar (29.74 inHg).
- 12:50 UTC (8:50 a.m. AST) at 16.7°N 62.2°W – Tropical Storm Ernesto makes its second landfall on the island of Montserrat with maximum sustained winds of 45 mph (75 km/h) and a minimum central pressure of 1005 mbar (29.68 inHg).
- 23:30 UTC (7:30 p.m. AST) at 18.3°N 64.7°W – Tropical Storm Ernesto makes its third landfall on Saint John, U.S. Virgin Islands, with maximum sustained winds of 65 mph (100 km/h) and a minimum central pressure of 998 mbar (29.47 inHg).

August 14

- 12:00 UTC (8:00 a.m. AST) at 19.9°N 67.2°W – Tropical Storm Ernesto strengthens into a Category 1 hurricane about 115 mi (185 km) northeast of the eastern tip of the Dominican Republic.

August 16

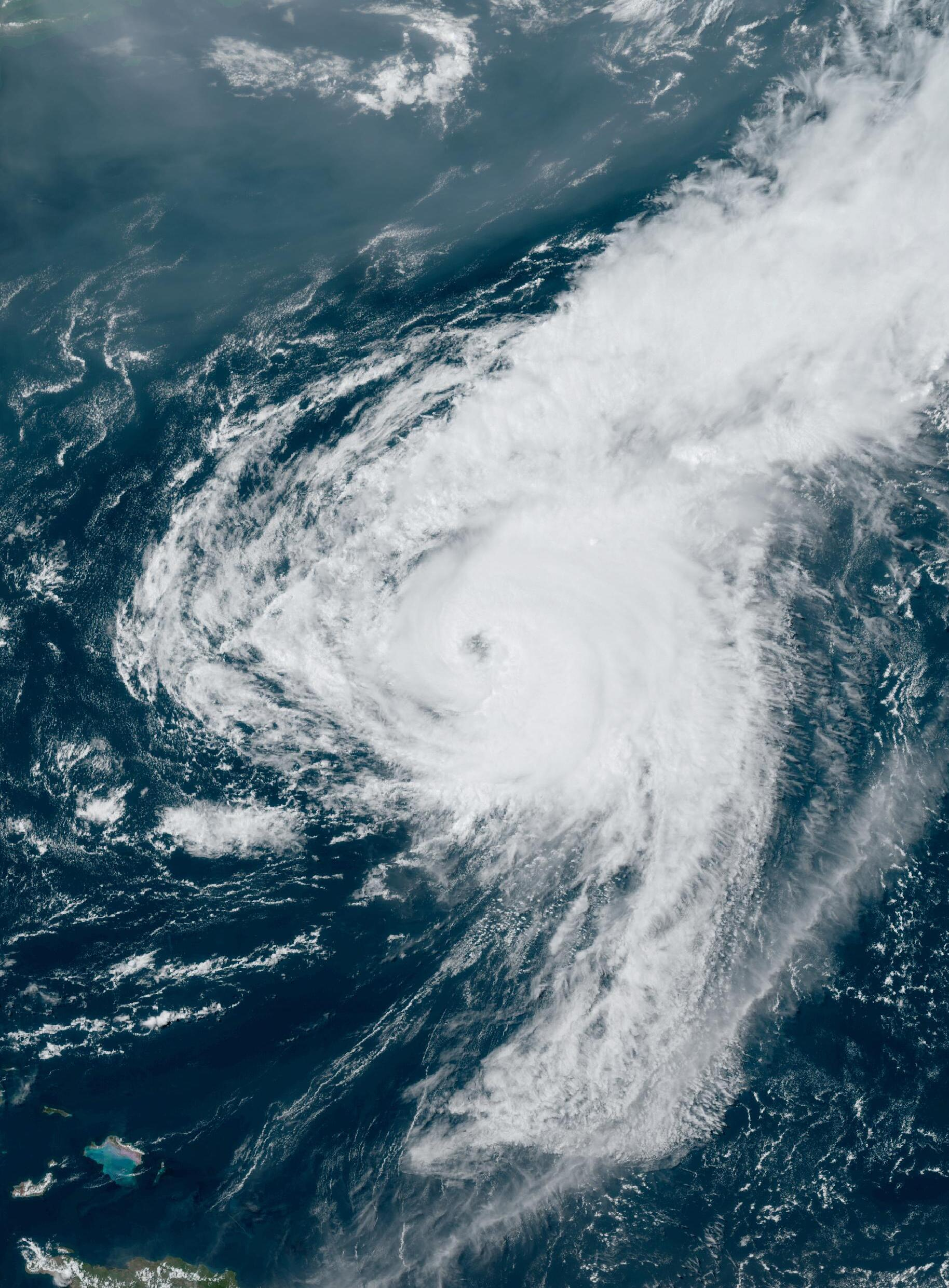
Hurricane Ernesto at peak intensity on August 16

- 00:00 UTC (8:00 p.m. AST, August 15) at 26.6°N 68.3°W – Hurricane Ernesto intensifies to Category 2 strength about 450 mi (720 km) south-southwest of Bermuda.
- 12:00 UTC (8:00 a.m. AST) at 28.9°N 66.8°W – Hurricane Ernesto attains its peak intensity, with maximum sustained winds of 100 mph (155 km/h) and a minimum central pressure of 967 mbar (28.56 inHg), about 265 mi (425 km) south-southwest of Bermuda.

August 17

- 00:00 UTC (8:00 p.m. AST, August 16) at 31.4°N 65.2°W – Hurricane Ernesto weakens to Category 1 strength about 100 mi (155 km) south-southwest of Bermuda.
- 08:30 UTC (4:30 a.m. AST) near 32.3°N 64.8°W – Hurricane Ernesto makes its fourth and final landfall on Bermuda with maximum sustained winds of 85 mph (140 km/h) and a minimum central pressure of 972 mbar (28.70 inHg).

August 18

- 00:00 UTC (8:00 p.m. AST, August 17) at 33.5°N 63.6°W – Hurricane Ernesto weakens into a tropical storm about 105 mi (165 km) northeast of Bermuda.
- 18:00 UTC (2:00 p.m. AST) at 36.4°N 62.6°W – Tropical Storm Ernesto re-intensifies to Category 1 strength about 305 mi (490 km) north-northeast of Bermuda.

August 19

- 12:00 UTC (8:00 a.m. AST) at 40.9°N 59.8°W – Hurricane Ernesto re-intensifies to Category 2 strength about 520 mi (835 km) southwest of Cape Race, Newfoundland, and simultaneously re-attains its peak intensity.
- 18:00 UTC (2:00 p.m. AST) at 42.8°N 58.1°W – Hurricane Ernesto weakens back to Category 1 strength about 360 mi (585 km) southwest of Cape Race.

August 20

- 12:00 UTC (8:00 a.m. AST) at 48.3°N 47.2°W – Hurricane Ernesto transitions into an extratropical cyclone about 260 mi (415 km) east-northeast of St. John's, Newfoundland, and later dissipates.

=== September ===
September 9

- 12:00 UTC (7:00 a.m. CDT) at 23.2°N 95.5°W – Tropical Storm Francine forms from an area of low pressure about 245 mi (400 km) southeast of the mouth of the Rio Grande. (Note: Due to the threat the developing system posed to Texas and Louisiana, the National Hurricane Center initiated advisories on it, designating it Potential Tropical Cyclone Six at 21:00 UTC (4:00 p.m. CDT) on September 8.)

September 11

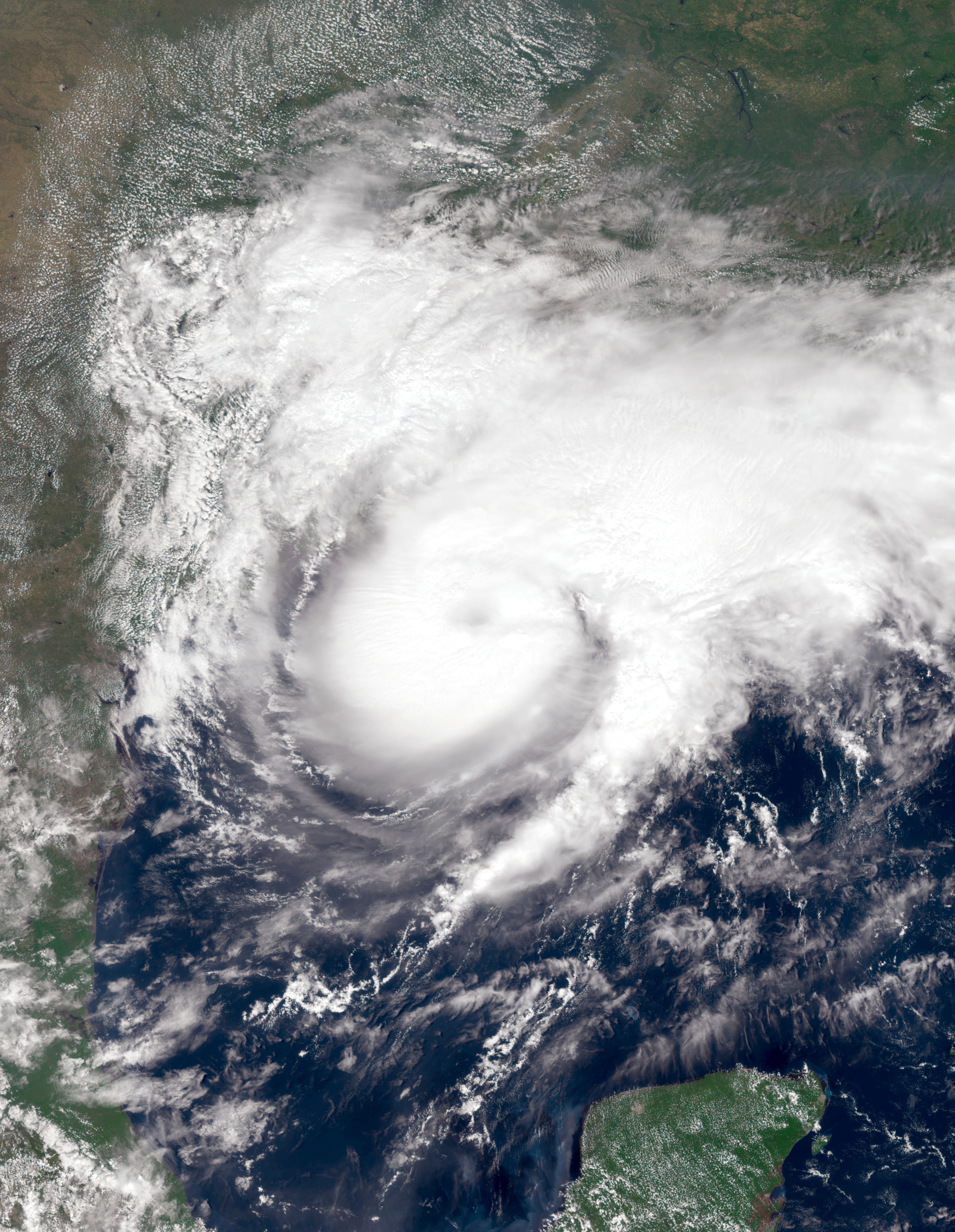
Hurricane Francine approaching the coast of Louisiana on September 11

- 00:00 UTC (7:00 p.m. CDT, September 10) at 26.0°N 94.7°W – Tropical Storm Francine strengthens into a Category 1 hurricane about 335 mi (535 km) southwest of Morgan City, Louisiana.
- 12:00 UTC (11:00 a.m. CVT) at 15.7°N 27.9°W – A tropical depression forms from a tropical wave about 230 mi (370 km) west of Cape Verde.
- 18:00 UTC (1:00 p.m. CDT) at 28.6°N 92.1°W – Hurricane Francine intensifies to Category 2 strength about 90 mi (150 km) southwest of Morgan City.
- 22:00 UTC (5:00 p.m. CDT) at 29.3°N 91.3°W – Hurricane Francine makes landfall in Terrebonne Parish, Louisiana, about 30 mi (45 km) south-southwest of Morgan City and simultaneously attains its peak intensity, with maximum sustained winds of 105 mph (165 km/h) and a minimum central pressure of 972 mbar (28.70 inHg).

September 12

- 00:00 UTC (7:00 p.m. CDT, September 11) at 29.6°N 90.9°W – Hurricane Francine weakens to Category 1 strength inland, about 15 mi (30 km) east-southeast of Morgan City.
- 06:00 UTC (1:00 a.m. CDT) at 30.5°N 90.3°W – Hurricane Francine weakens into a tropical storm inland, about 75 mi (120 km) northeast of Morgan City.
- 12:00 UTC (7:00 a.m. CDT) at 31.8°N 90.1°W – Tropical Storm Francine weakens into a tropical depression inland over central Mississippi.
- 18:00 UTC (1:00 p.m. CDT) at 33.4°N 89.7°W – Tropical Depression Francine transitions into an extratropical cyclone inland over northern Mississippi, and later dissipates.

September 13

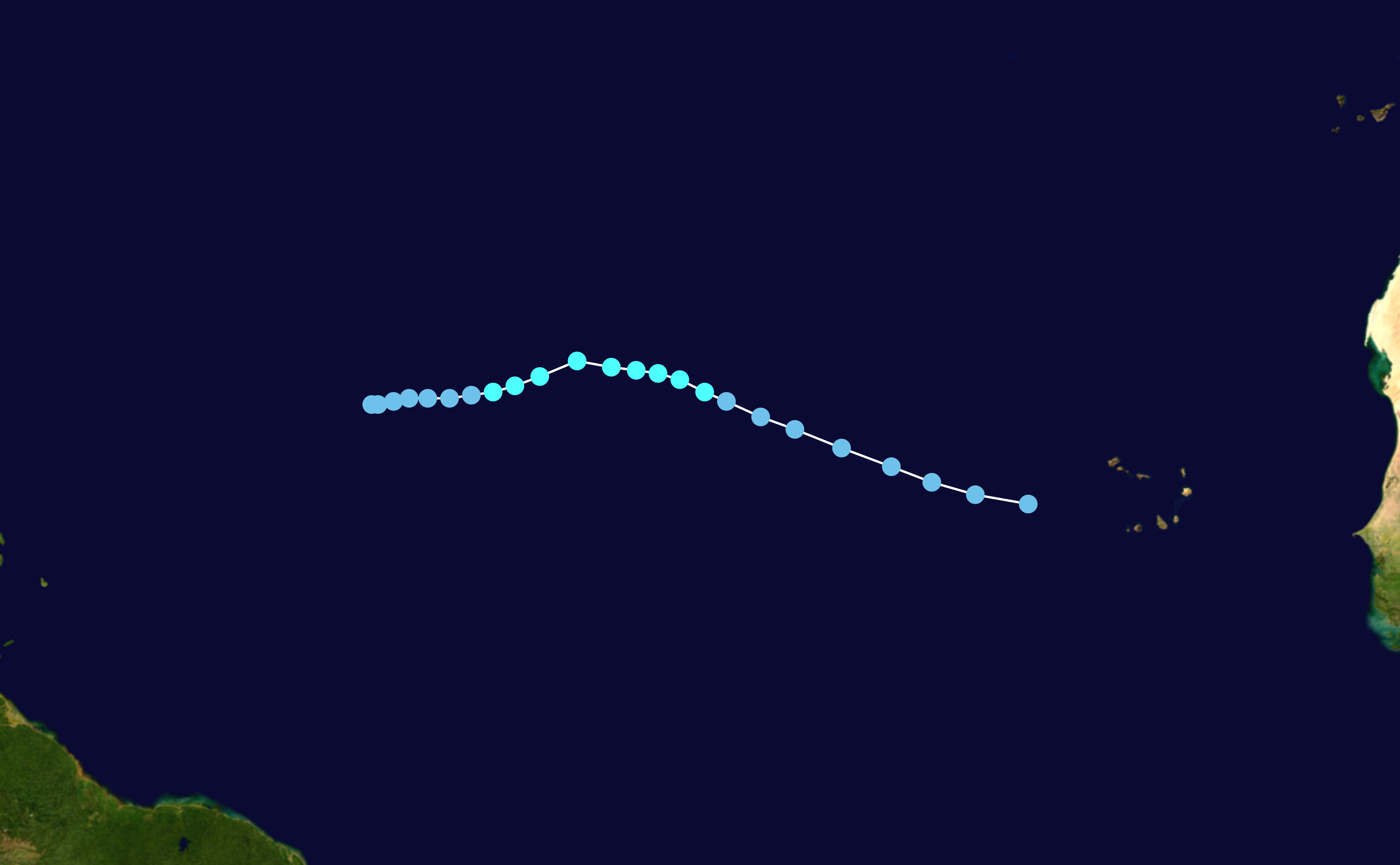
Storm path of Tropical Storm Gordon

- 12:00 UTC (8:00 a.m. AST) at 19.3°N 38.3°W – The recently formed tropical depression strengthens into Tropical Storm Gordon about 1,000 mi (1,610 km) west-northwest of Cape Verde.

September 14

- 00:00 UTC (8:00 p.m. AST, September 13) at 19.9°N 39.8°W – Tropical Storm Gordon attains its peak intensity, with maximum sustained winds of 45 mph (75 km/h) and a minimum central pressure of 1,004 millibars (29.65 inHg), about 1,105 mi (1,780 km) west-northwest of Cape Verde.

September 15

- 18:00 UTC (2:00 p.m. AST) at 19.2°N 45.8°W – Tropical Storm Gordon weakens into a tropical depression about 1,480 mi (2,380 km) west of Cape Verde.

September 17

- 06:00 UTC (2:00 a.m. AST) at 18.9°N 49.0°W – Tropical Depression Gordon is last noted as a tropical cyclone about 1,685 mi (2,715 km) west of Cape Verde, and dissipates within six hours.

September 24

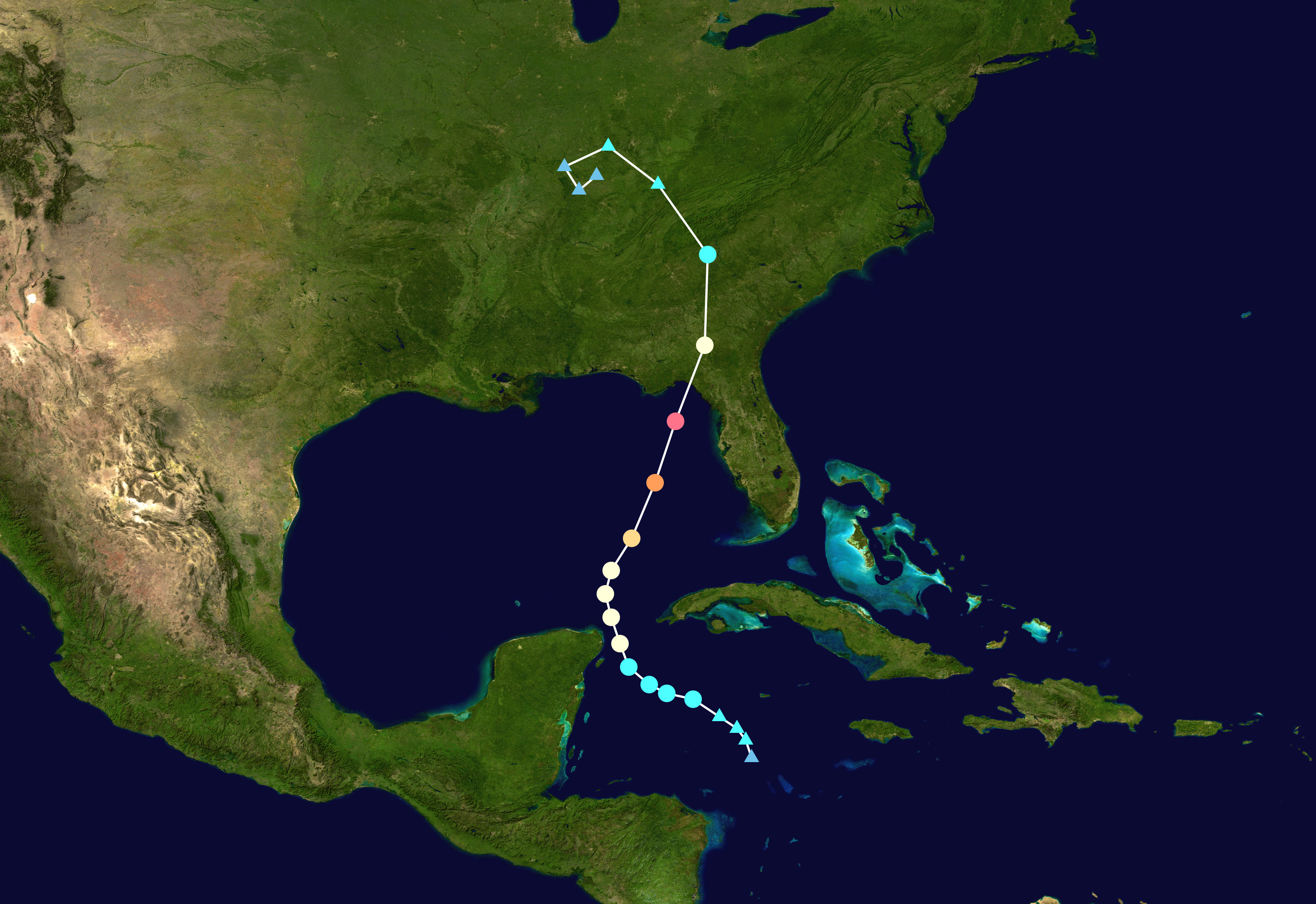
Storm path of Hurricane Helene

- 12:00 UTC (8:00 a.m. EDT) at 19.2°N 83.7°W – Tropical Storm Helene forms from a Central American gyre about 200 mi (325 km) south of the western tip of Cuba. (Note: Due to the threat the developing system posed to Mexico and Cuba, the National Hurricane Center initiated advisories on it, designating it Potential Tropical Cyclone Nine at 15:00 UTC (11:00 a.m. EDT) on September 23.)

September 25

- 12:00 UTC (7:00 a.m. CDT) at 21.1°N 86.2°W – Tropical Storm Helene strengthens into a Category 1 hurricane about 40 mi (65 km) east of Cancún, Quintana Roo.
- 18:00 UTC (2:00 p.m. AST) at 36.9°N 55.7°W – Tropical Storm Isaac forms from an extratropical low about 595 mi (955 km) northeast of Bermuda.

September 26

- 12:00 UTC (7:00 a.m. CDT) at 24.7°N 85.8°W – Hurricane Helene intensifies to Category 2 strength about 305 mi (490 km) southwest of Tampa, Florida.
- 18:00 UTC (1:00 p.m. CDT) at 26.6°N 85.0°W – Hurricane Helene intensifies to Category 3 strength about 185 mi (295 km) west-southwest of Tampa.

September 27

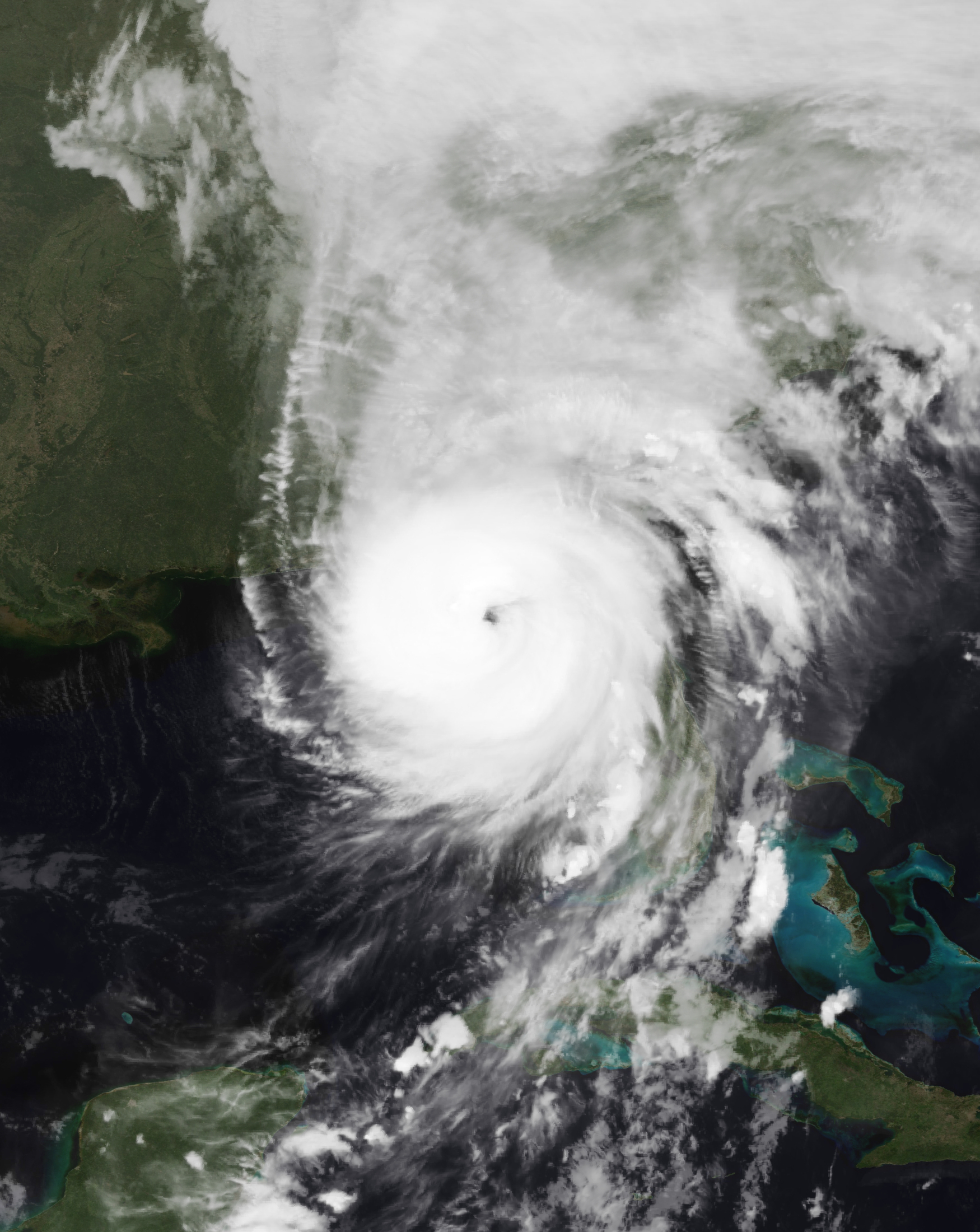
Hurricane Helene approaching Florida near peak intensity on September 27

- 00:00 UTC (8:00 p.m. EDT, September 26) at 28.7°N 84.3°W – Hurricane Helene intensifies to Category 4 strength about 110 mi (175 km) south-southwest of Perry, Florida.
- 03:10 UTC (11:10 p.m. EDT, September 26) at 30.0°N 83.7°W – Hurricane Helene reaches its peak intensity, with maximum sustained winds of 140 mph (220 km/h) and a minimum central pressure of 939 mbar (27.73 inHg), as it makes landfall about 10 mi (15 km) southwest of Perry.
- 05:00 UTC (1:00 a.m. EDT) at 30.8°N 83.5°W – Hurricane Helene rapidly weakens to Category 2 strength inland, about 45 mi (75 km) north of Perry.
- 06:00 UTC (2:00 a.m. EDT) at 31.3°N 83.3°W – Hurricane Helene weakens to Category 1 strength inland, about 85 mi (140 km) north of Perry.
- 06:00 UTC (2:00 a.m. AST) at 17.1°N 41.5°W – A tropical depression forms from a tropical wave about 1,325 mi (2,130 km) east of the northern Leeward Islands.
- 09:00 UTC (5:00 a.m. EDT) at 32.8°N 83.0°W – Hurricane Helene weakens into a tropical storm inland, about 35 mi (55 km) east of Macon, Georgia.
- 12:00 UTC (8:00 a.m. AST) at 37.1°N 47.7°W – Tropical Storm Isaac strengthens into a Category 1 hurricane about 1,020 mi (1,640 km) east-northeast of Bermuda.
- 12:00 UTC (8:00 a.m. AST) at 17.8°N 42.5°W – The recently formed tropical depression strengthens into Tropical Storm Joyce about 1,245 mi (2,000 km) east of the northern Leeward Islands.
- 18:00 UTC (2:00 p.m. EDT) at 36.8°N 84.9°W – Tropical Storm Helene transitions into a post-tropical cyclone inland over southern Kentucky.
- 18:00 UTC (2:00 p.m. AST) at 18.2°N 43.4°W – Tropical Storm Joyce attains its peak intensity, with maximum sustained winds of 50 mph (85 km/h) and a minimum central pressure of 1,001 mbar (29.56 inHg), about 1,180 mi (1,900 km) east of the northern Leeward Islands.

September 28

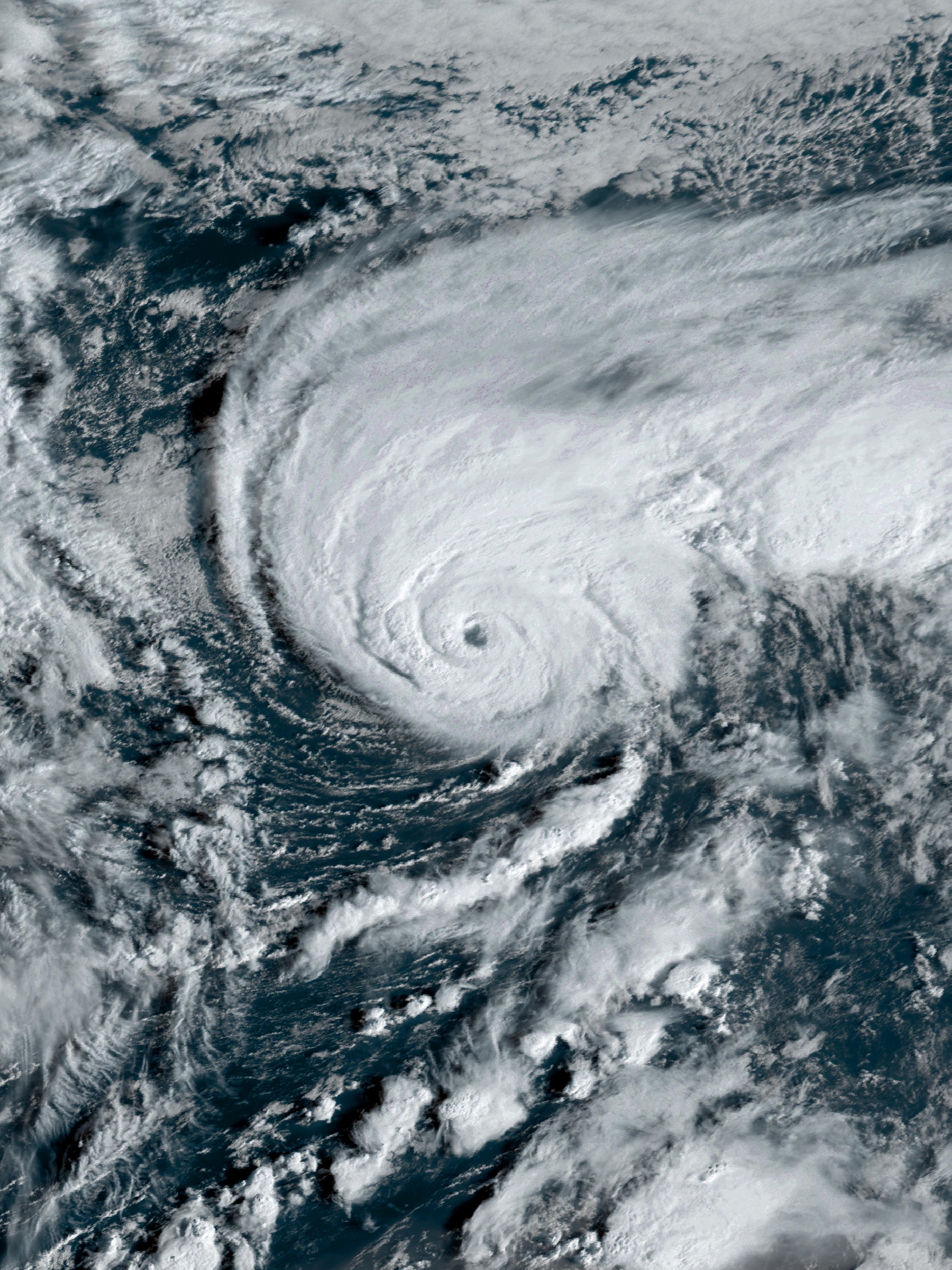
Hurricane Isaac at peak intensity on September 28

- 00:00 UTC (8:00 p.m. AST, September 27) at 38.0°N 44.4°W – Hurricane Isaac intensifies to Category 2 strength about 1,210 mi (1,945 km) east-northeast of Bermuda.
- 06:00 UTC (2:00 a.m. AST) at 38.8°N 42.3°W – Hurricane Isaac attains its peak intensity, with maximum sustained winds of 105 mph (165 km/h) and a minimum central pressure of 963 mbar (28.44 inHg), about 1,335 mi (2,150 km) east-northeast of Bermuda.

September 29

- 00:00 UTC (12:00 a.m. GMT) at 41.5°N 38.0°W – Hurricane Isaac weakens to Category 1 strength about 1,600 mi (2,575 km) east-northeast of Bermuda.
- 18:00 UTC (6:00 p.m. GMT) at 43.7°N 35.1°W – Hurricane Isaac weakens into a tropical storm about 1,780 mi (2,860 km) east-northeast of Bermuda.
- 18:00 UTC (2:00 p.m. AST) at 13.8°N 32.1°W – A tropical depression forms from a tropical wave about 500 mi (805 km) west of Brava, Cape Verde.

September 30

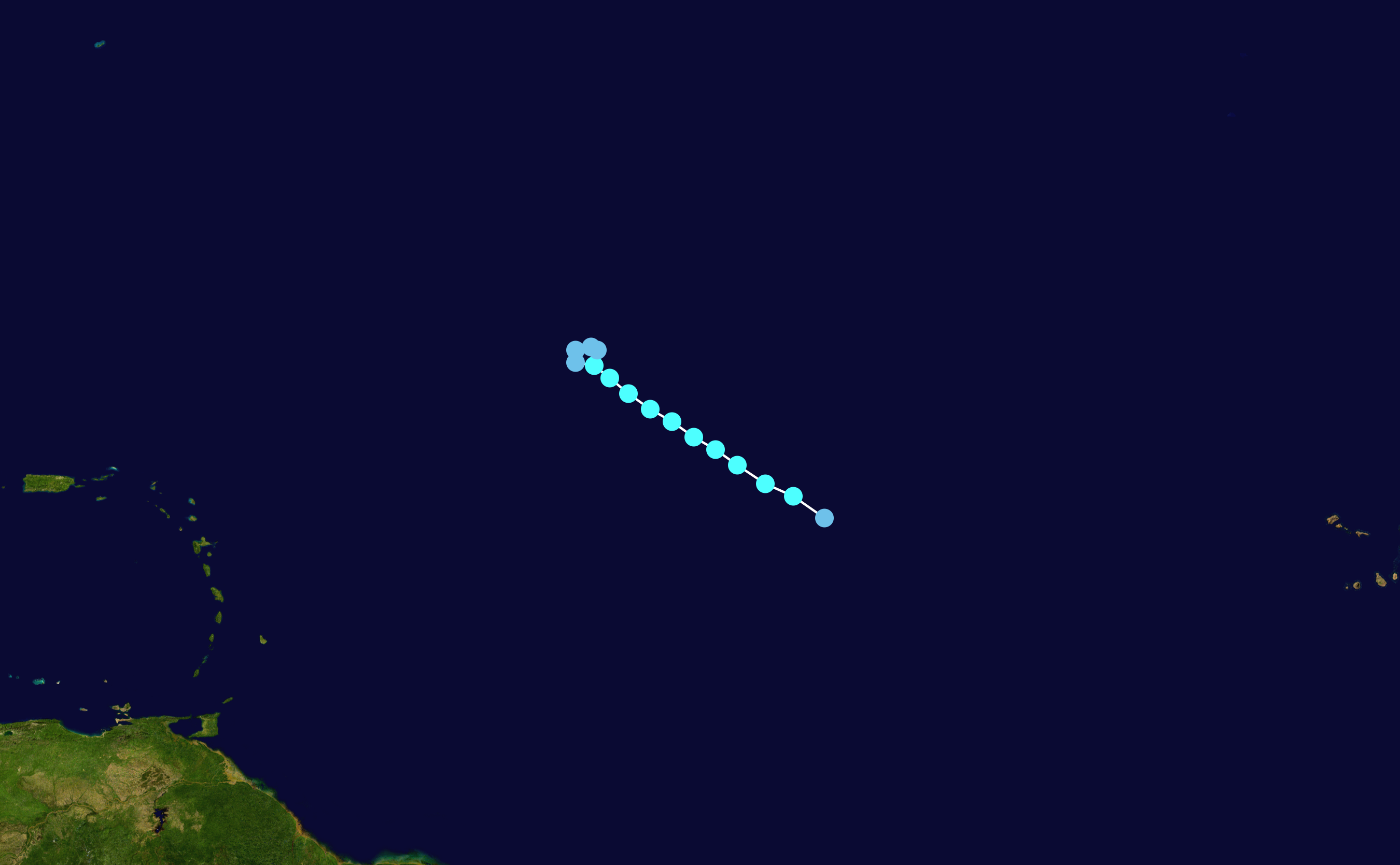
Storm path of Tropical Storm Joyce

- 00:00 UTC (8:00 p.m. AST, September 29) at 22.1°N 49.5°W – Tropical Storm Joyce weakens into a tropical depression about 700 mi (1,130 km) east-northeast of the northern Leeward Islands, and later dissipates.
- 06:00 UTC (6:00 a.m. GMT) at 44.4°N 32.0°W – Tropical Storm Isaac transitions into an extratropical cyclone over the northern Atlantic about 1,940 mi (3,120 km) east-northeast of Bermuda, and subsequently dissipates.
- 06:00 UTC (2:00 a.m. AST) at 13.6°N 33.4°W – The recently formed tropical depression strengthens into Tropical Storm Kirk about 585 mi (945 km) west of Brava.

=== October ===
October 1

- 18:00 UTC (2:00 p.m. AST) at 15.9°N 39.7°W – Tropical Storm Kirk strengthens into a Category 1 hurricane about 1,000 mi (1,610 km) west of Brava.

October 2

- 06:00 UTC (5:00 a.m. CVT) at 10.7°N 27.6°W – A tropical depression forms from an area of low pressure about 415 mi (665 km) southwest of Cape Verde.

October 3

- 00:00 UTC (8:00 p.m. AST, October 2) at 19.1°N 44.1°W – Hurricane Kirk rapidly intensifies to Category 3 strength about 1,310 mi (2,110 km) west-northwest of Brava.
- 00:00 UTC (11:00 p.m. CVT, October 2) at 10.4°N 29.8°W – The recently formed tropical depression strengthens into Tropical Storm Leslie about 530 mi (850 km) southwest of Cape Verde.
- 18:00 UTC (2:00 p.m. AST) at 20.7°N 46.3°W – Hurricane Kirk intensifies to Category 4 strength about 1,475 mi (2,370 km) west-northwest of Brava.

October 4

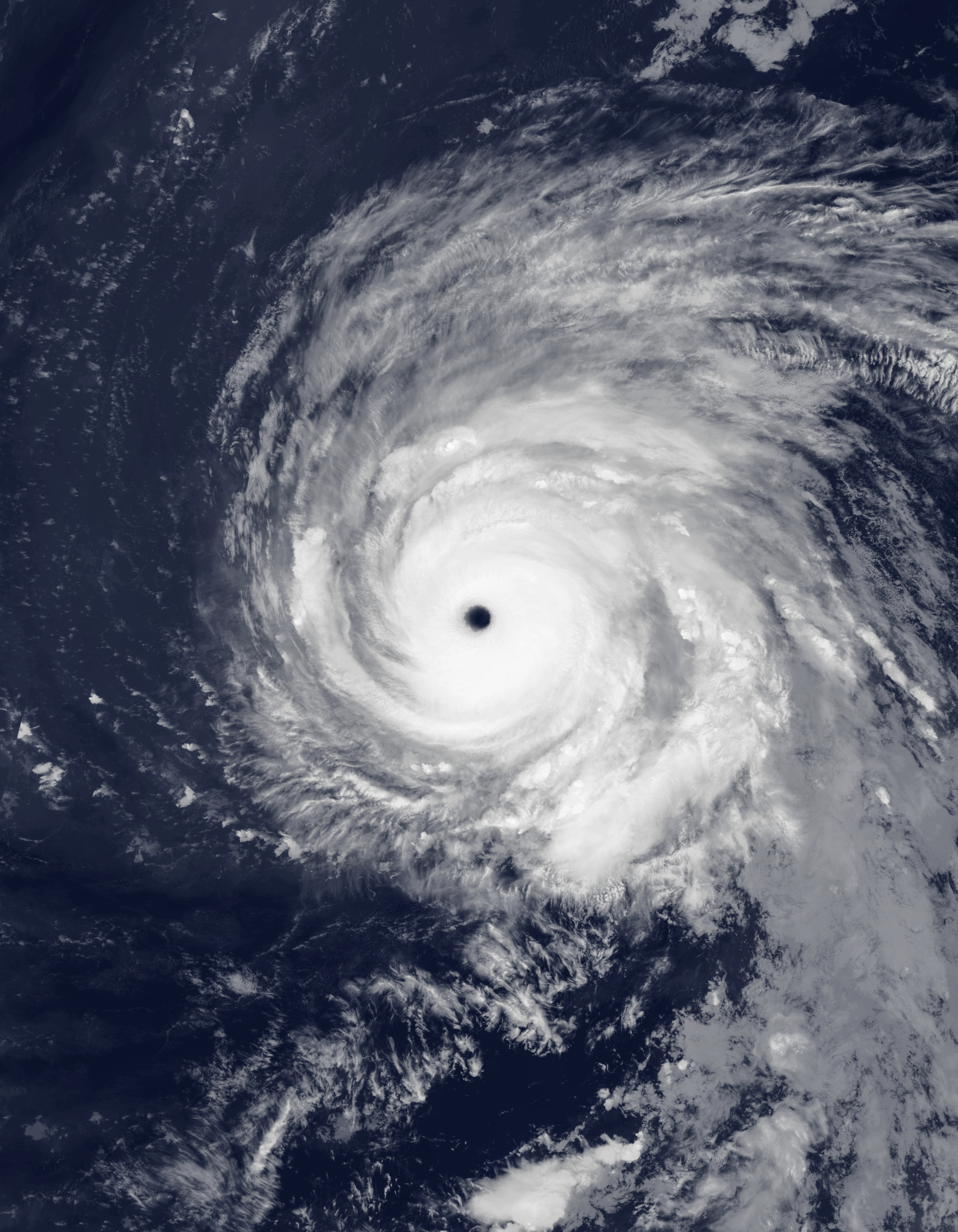
Hurricane Kirk near peak intensity early on October 4

- 00:00 UTC (8:00 p.m. AST, October 3) at 21.2°N 47.1°W – Hurricane Kirk attains its peak intensity, with maximum sustained winds of 150 mph (240 km/h) and a minimum central pressure of 928 millibars (27.40 inHg), about 1,530 mi (2,465 km) west-northwest of Brava.

October 5

- 00:00 UTC (8:00 p.m. AST, October 4) at 10.3°N 33.9°W – Tropical Storm Leslie strengthens into a Category 1 hurricane about 770 mi (1,240 km) west-southwest of Cape Verde.
- 06:00 UTC (2:00 a.m. AST) at 25.4°N 50.1°W – Hurricane Kirk weakens to Category 3 strength about 1,795 mi (2,890 km) west-northwest of Brava.
- 12:00 UTC (7:00 a.m. CDT) at 22.0°N 95.5°W – A tropical depression forms from an area of unsettled weather about 155 mi (250 km) east of Tampico, Tamaulipas.
- 18:00 UTC (1:00 p.m. CDT) at 22.5°N 95.5°W – The recently formed tropical depression strengthens into Tropical Storm Milton about 150 mi (240 km) east of Tampico.

October 6

- 06:00 UTC (2:00 a.m. AST) at 32.6°N 49.5°W – Hurricane Kirk weakens to Category 2 strength about 1,270 mi (2,045 km) west-southwest of the Azores.
- 06:00 UTC (2:00 a.m. AST) at 12.4°N 36.9°W – Hurricane Leslie attains its initial peak intensity, with maximum sustained winds of 90 mph (150 km/h) and a minimum central pressure of 980 mbar (28.94 inHg), about 910 mi (1,465 km) west-southwest of Cape Verde.
- 18:00 UTC (2:00 p.m. AST) at 36.4°N 47.2°W – Hurricane Kirk weakens to Category 1 strength about 1,060 mi (1,705 km) west of the Azores.
- 18:00 UTC (1:00 p.m. CDT) at 22.5°N 94.1°W – Tropical Storm Milton strengthens into a Category 1 hurricane about 305 mi (490 km) west-northwest of Mérida, Yucatán.

October 7

Hurricane Milton near peak intensity on October 7

- 06:00 UTC (1:00 a.m. CDT) at 22.1°N 92.9°W – Hurricane Milton intensifies to Category 2 strength about 225 mi (360 km) west-northwest of Mérida.
- 12:00 UTC (12:00 p.m. GMT) at 41.2°N 39.9°W – Hurricane Kirk transitions into an extratropical cyclone about 650 mi (1,045 km) west-northwest of the Azores.
- 12:00 UTC (7:00 a.m. CDT) at 21.8°N 92.2°W – Hurricane Milton rapidly intensifies to Category 4 strength about 180 mi (285 km) west-northwest of Mérida.
- 18:00 UTC (1:00 p.m. CDT) at 21.7°N 91.3°W – Hurricane Milton intensifies to Category 5 strength about 120 mi (195 km) west-northwest of Mérida.
- 20:00 UTC (3:00 p.m. CDT) at 21.8°N 90.9°W – Hurricane Milton attains its peak intensity, with maximum sustained winds of 180 mph (285 km/h) and a minimum central pressure of 895 mbar (26.43 inHg), about 100 mi (155 km) northwest of Mérida.

October 8

- 00:00 UTC (8:00 p.m. AST, October 7) at 17.6°N 43.0°W – Hurricane Leslie weakens into a tropical storm about 1,290 mi (2,075 km) west of Cape Verde.
- 06:00 UTC (1:00 a.m. CDT) at 21.9°N 89.5°W – Hurricane Milton weakens to Category 4 strength about 65 mi (100 km) north of Mérida.
- 18:00 UTC (2:00 p.m. AST) at 19.7°N 46.1°W – Tropical Storm Leslie re-strengthens into a Category 1 hurricane about 1,510 mi (2,425 km) west of Cape Verde.
- 18:00 UTC (1:00 p.m. CDT) at 22.5°N 88.0°W – Hurricane Milton re-intensifies to Category 5 strength about 150 mi (240 km) northeast of Mérida.
- 22:05 UTC (5:05 p.m. CDT) at 22.8°N 87.2°W – Hurricane Milton attains its secondary peak intensity, with maximum sustained winds of 165 mph (270 km/h) and a minimum central pressure of 902 mbar (26.64 inHg), about 200 mi (325 km) northeast of Mérida.

October 9

- 02:05 UTC (9:05 p.m. CDT, October 8) at 23.3°N 86.6°W – Hurricane Milton weakens to Category 4 strength about 255 mi (405 km) northeast of Mérida.
- 06:00 UTC (1:00 a.m. CDT) at 23.8°N 85.9°W – Hurricane Milton re-intensifies to Category 5 strength about 305 mi (490 km) northeast of Mérida.
- 08:25 UTC (3:25 a.m. CDT) at 24.3°N 85.4°W – Hurricane Milton attains its tertiary peak intensity, with maximum sustained winds of 160 mph (260 km/h) and a minimum central pressure of 907 mbar (26.78 inHg), about 270 mi (435 km) southwest of Siesta Key, Florida.
- 12:00 UTC (8:00 a.m. EDT) at 25.0°N 84.8°W – Hurricane Milton weakens to Category 4 strength about 205 mi (335 km) southwest of Siesta Key.
- 18:00 UTC (2:00 p.m. AST) at 21.9°N 48.6°W – Hurricane Leslie intensifies to Category 2 strength about 1,690 mi (2,720 km) west-northwest of Cape Verde.

October 10

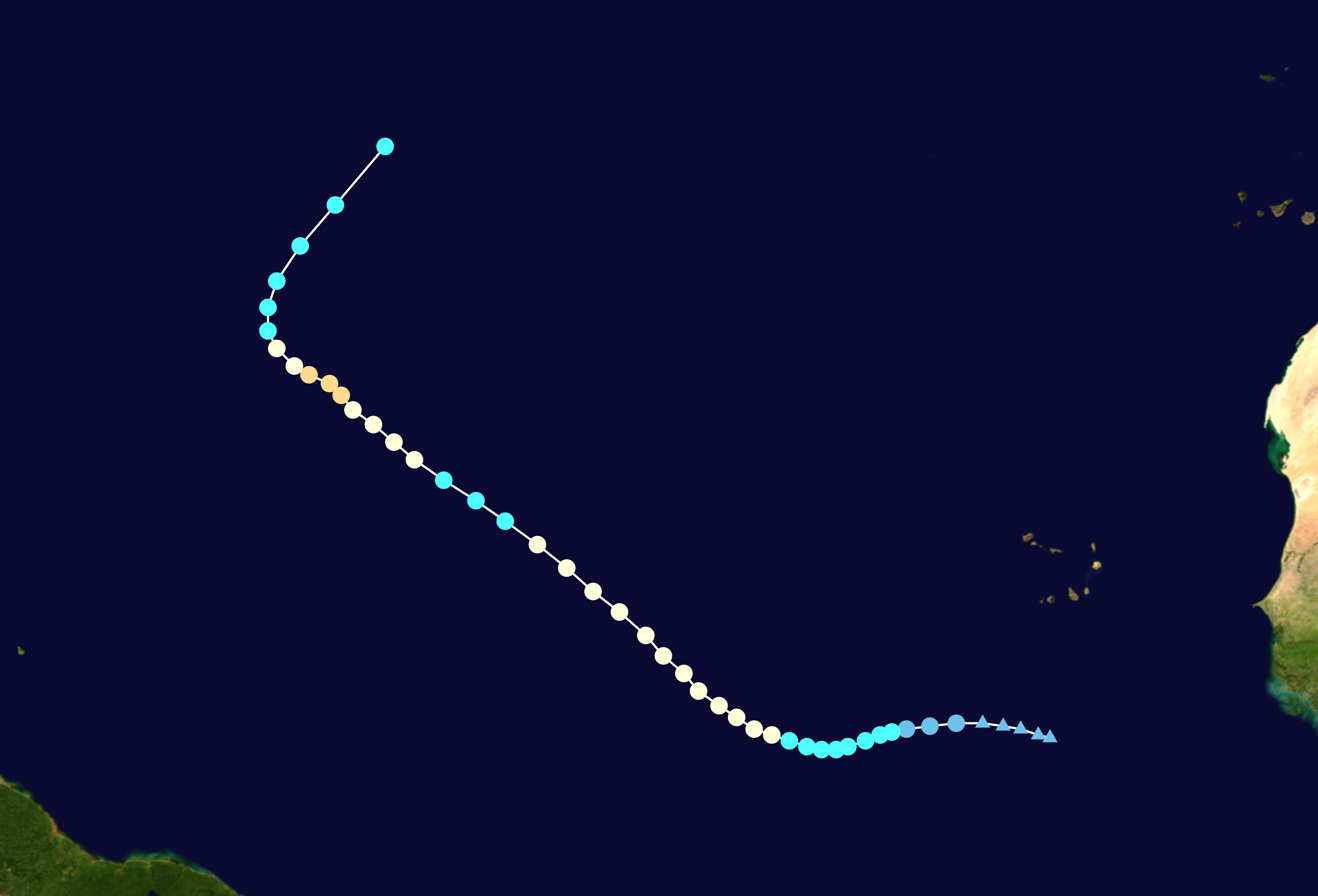
Storm path of Hurricane Leslie

- 00:00 UTC (8:00 p.m. AST, October 9) at 22.3°N 49.0°W – Hurricane Leslie attains its peak intensity, with maximum sustained winds of 105 mph (165 km/h) and a minimum central pressure of 970 mbar (28.64 inHg), about 1,720 mi (2,770 km) west-northwest of Cape Verde.
- 00:00 UTC (8:00 p.m. EDT, October 9) at 27.3°N 82.7°W – Hurricane Milton weakens to Category 3 strength about 10 mi (20 km) west of Siesta Key.
- 00:30 UTC (8:30 p.m. EDT, October 9) at 27.4°N 82.6°W – Hurricane Milton makes landfall near Siesta Key with maximum sustained winds of 115 mph (185 km/h) and a minimum central pressure of 958 millibars (28.29 inHg).
- 06:00 UTC (2:00 a.m. EDT) at 28.1°N 81.3°W – Hurricane Milton rapidly weakens to Category 1 strength inland, about 50 mi (85 km) west-southwest of Cape Canaveral.
- 12:00 UTC (8:00 a.m. AST) at 22.9°N 50.2°W – Hurricane Leslie weakens to Category 1 strength about 1,800 mi (2,900 km) west-northwest of Cape Verde.
- 18:00 UTC (2:00 p.m. EDT) at 29.3°N 77.5°W – Hurricane Milton transitions into an extratropical cyclone offshore, about 215 mi (345 km) east of Daytona Beach, Florida, and later dissipates.

October 11

- 00:00 UTC (8:00 p.m. AST, October 10) at 24.1°N 51.1°W – Hurricane Leslie weakens into a tropical storm about 1,875 mi (3,020 km) west-northwest of Cape Verde.

October 12

- 06:00 UTC (2:00 a.m. AST) at 30.4°N 47.1°W – Tropical Storm Leslie is last noted as a tropical cyclone about 1,810 mi (2,915 km) northwest of Cape Verde, and dissipates within six hours.

October 19

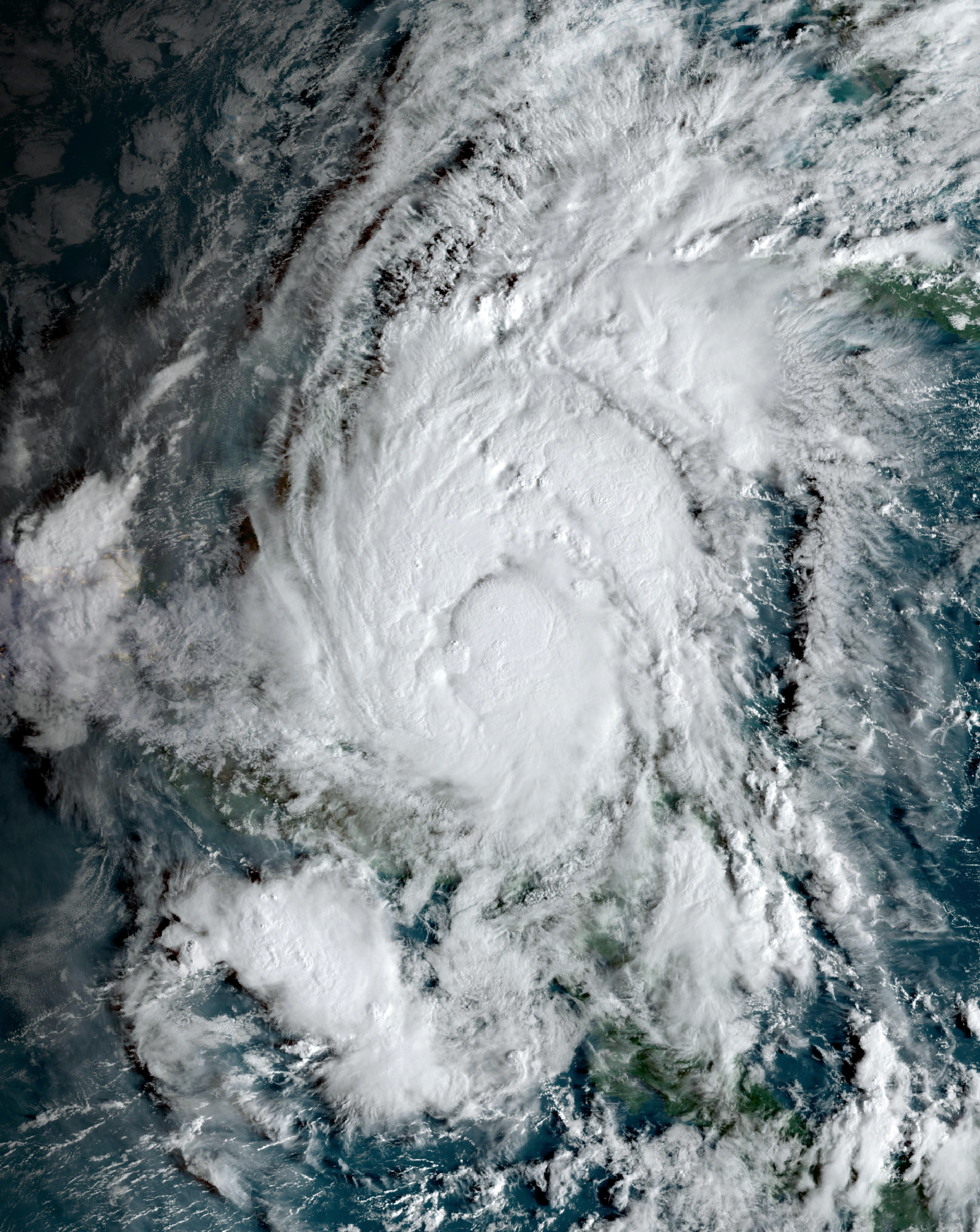
Tropical Storm Nadine approaching Belize on October 19

- 00:00 UTC (7:00 p.m. CDT, October 18) at 17.3°N 85.5°W – Tropical Storm Nadine forms from an area of unsettled weather about 185 mi (295 km) east of Belize City.
- 00:00 UTC (8:00 p.m. AST, October 18) at 21.0°N 66.5°W – Tropical Storm Oscar forms from a tropical wave about 180 mi (285 km) north of San Juan, Puerto Rico.
- 16:00 UTC (11:00 a.m. CDT) at 17.5°N 88.2°W – Tropical Storm Nadine attains its peak intensity, with maximum sustained winds of 60 mph (95 km/h) and a minimum central pressure of 1002 mbar (29.59 inHg), as it makes landfall near Belize City.
- 18:00 UTC (2:00 p.m. EDT) at 21.4°N 70.6°W – Tropical Storm Oscar strengthens into a Category 1 hurricane about 110 mi (175 km) north of Puerto Plata, Dominican Republic.
- 19:15 UTC (3:15 p.m. EDT) at 21.5°N 71.1°W – Hurricane Oscar makes its first landfall on Grand Turk with maximum sustained winds of 85 mph (140 km/h) and a minimum central pressure of 987 mbar (29.15 inHg).

October 20

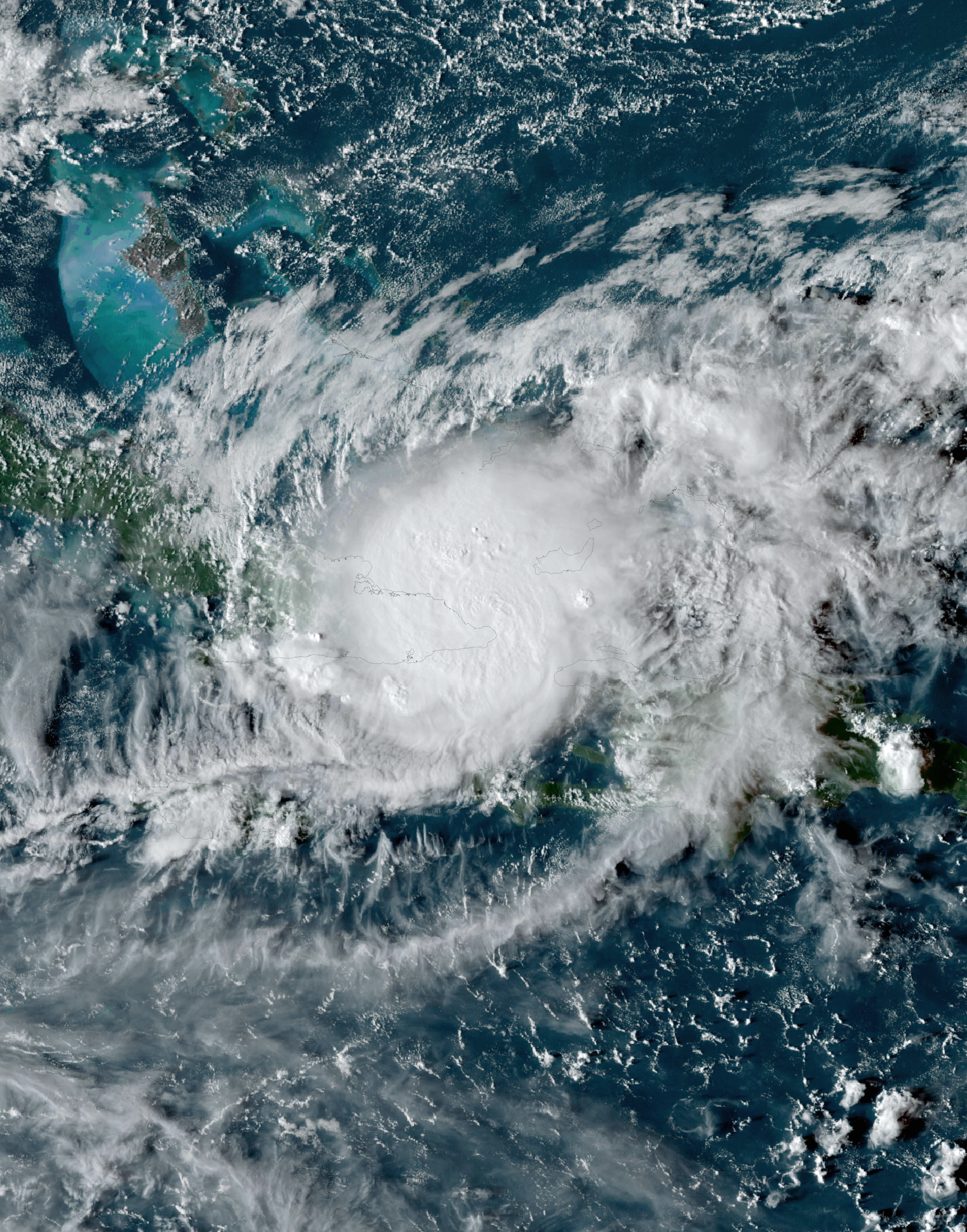
Hurricane Oscar nearing landfall in Cuba on October 20

- 00:00 UTC (7:00 p.m. CDT, October 19) at 17.3°N 90.0°W – Tropical Storm Nadine weakens into a tropical depression inland, about 30 mi (45 km) north-northwest of Flores, Petén.
- 06:00 UTC (1:00 a.m. CDT) at 17.1°N 91.2°W – Tropical Depression Nadine degenerates into a remnant low inland, about 85 mi (140 km) west of Flores, and later dissipates over the mountainous terrain of southern Mexico.
- 18:00 UTC (2:00 p.m. EDT) at 20.5°N 74.0°W – Hurricane Oscar attains its peak intensity, with maximum sustained winds of 85 mph (140 km/h) and a minimum central pressure of 984 mbar (29.058 inHg), about 35 mi (55 km) east-northeast of Baracoa, Cuba.
- 22:50 UTC (6:00 p.m. EDT) at 20.3°N 74.4°W – Hurricane Oscar makes its second and final landfall near Baracoa at peak intensity.

October 21

- 06:00 UTC (2:00 a.m. EDT) at 20.1°N 75.0°W – Hurricane Oscar weakens into a tropical storm inland, about 35 mi (55 km) west-southwest of Baracoa.

October 22

- 12:00 UTC (8:00 a.m. EDT) at 22.7°N 74.6°W – Tropical Storm Oscar is last noted as a tropical cyclone over the central Bahamas, and dissipates within six hours.

=== November ===
November 1

- 18:00 UTC (6:00 p.m. GMT) at 40.6°N 36.5°W – Subtropical Storm Patty forms from an extratropical cyclone about 290 mi (465 km) west-northwest of the western Azores.

November 2

- 12:00 UTC (3:00 p.m. GMT) at 39.4°N 33.3°W – Subtropical Storm Patty attains its peak intensity, with maximum sustained winds of 65 mph (100 km/h) and a minimum central pressure of 982 millibars (29.00 inHg), about 115 mi (185 km) west of Flores.

November 3

- 12:00 UTC (12:00 p.m. GMT) at 37.7°N 20.0°W – Subtropical Storm Patty transitions into a tropical storm between São Miguel and Santa Maria.

November 4

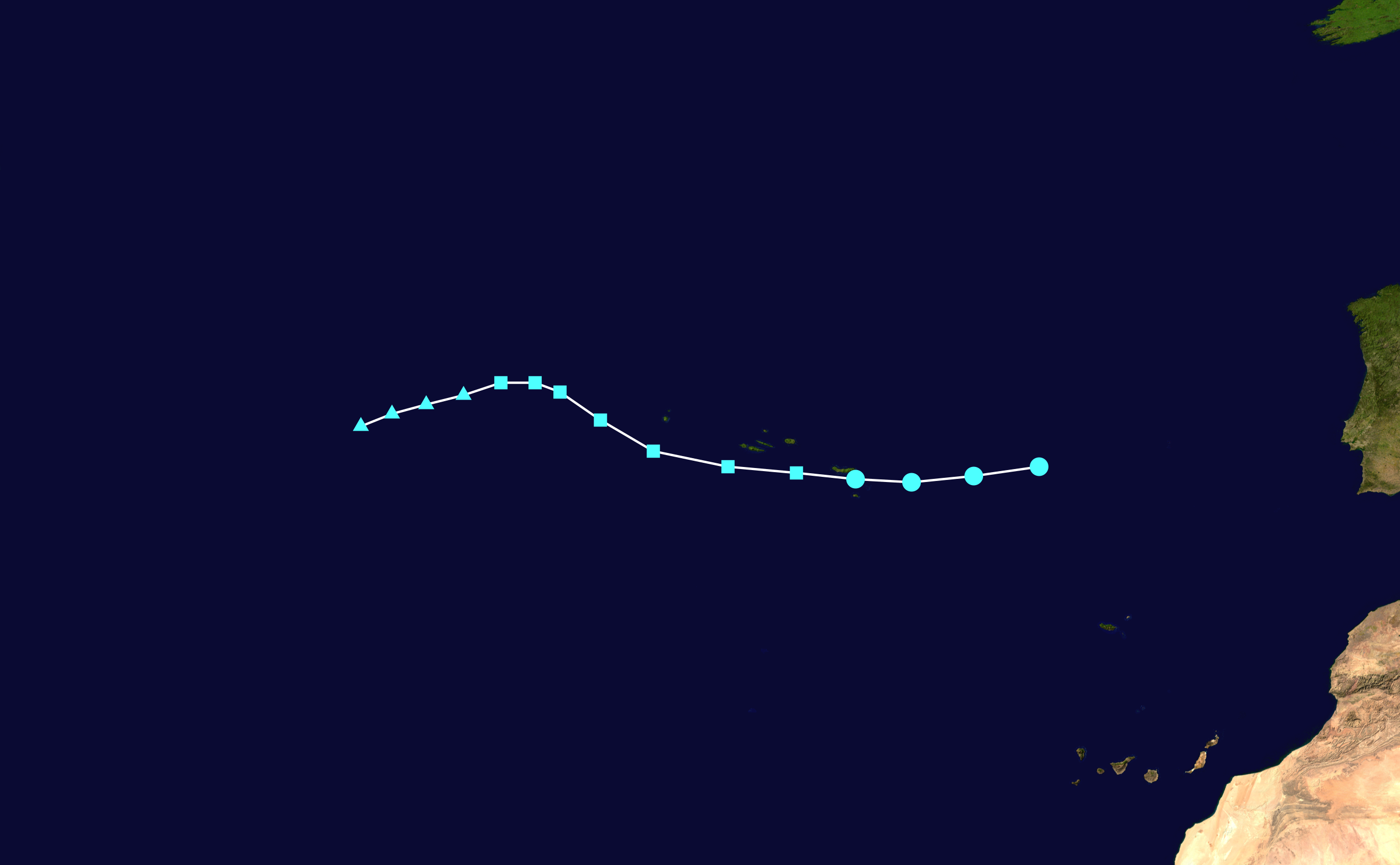
Storm path of Tropical Storm Patty

- 06:00 UTC (6:00 a.m. GMT) at 37.9°N 19.2°W – Tropical Storm Patty is last noted as a tropical cyclone about 330 mi (530 km) east of Santa Maria, and dissipates within six hours.
- 12:00 UTC (7:00 a.m. EST) (Note: On November 3, daylight saving time ended in many areas of the basin, resulting in the gap between local time and Coordinated Universal Time widening by one hour.) at 14.8°N 76.6°W – A tropical depression forms from a Central American gyre about 220 mi (350 km) south of Kingston, Jamaica. (Note: Due to the threat the developing system posed to Jamaica and the Cayman Islands, the National Hurricane Center initiated advisories on it, designating it Potential Tropical Cyclone Eighteen at 21:00 UTC (4:00 p.m. EST) on November 3.)
- 18:00 UTC (1:00 a.m. EST) at 15.1°N 76.4°W – The recently formed tropical depression strengthens into Tropical Storm Rafael about 200 mi (325 km) south of Kingston.

November 6

- 00:00 UTC (7:00 p.m. EST, November 5) at 19.4°N 80.0°W – Tropical Storm Rafael strengthens into a Category 1 hurricane just south of Little Cayman.
- 12:00 UTC (7:00 a.m. EST) at 21.0°N 81.6°W – Hurricane Rafael intensifies to Category 2 strength about 100 mi (155 km) southeast of the Isle of Youth.
- 18:00 UTC (1:00 p.m. EST) at 22.0°N 82.3°W – Hurricane Rafael intensifies to Category 3 strength about 40 mi (65 km) east-northeast of the Isle of Youth, and simultaneously attains its initial peak intensity, with maximum sustained winds of 115 mph (185 km/h) and a minimum central pressure of 955 mbar (28.20 inHg).
- 21:15 UTC (4:15 p.m. EST) at 22.7°N 82.7°W – Hurricane Rafael makes landfall just east of Playa Majana in the Cuban province of Artemisa at its initial peak intensity.

November 7

- 00:00 UTC (7:00 p.m. EST, November 6) at 23.1°N 83.2°W – Hurricane Rafael weakens to Category 2 strength as it emerges over the Gulf of Mexico.

November 8

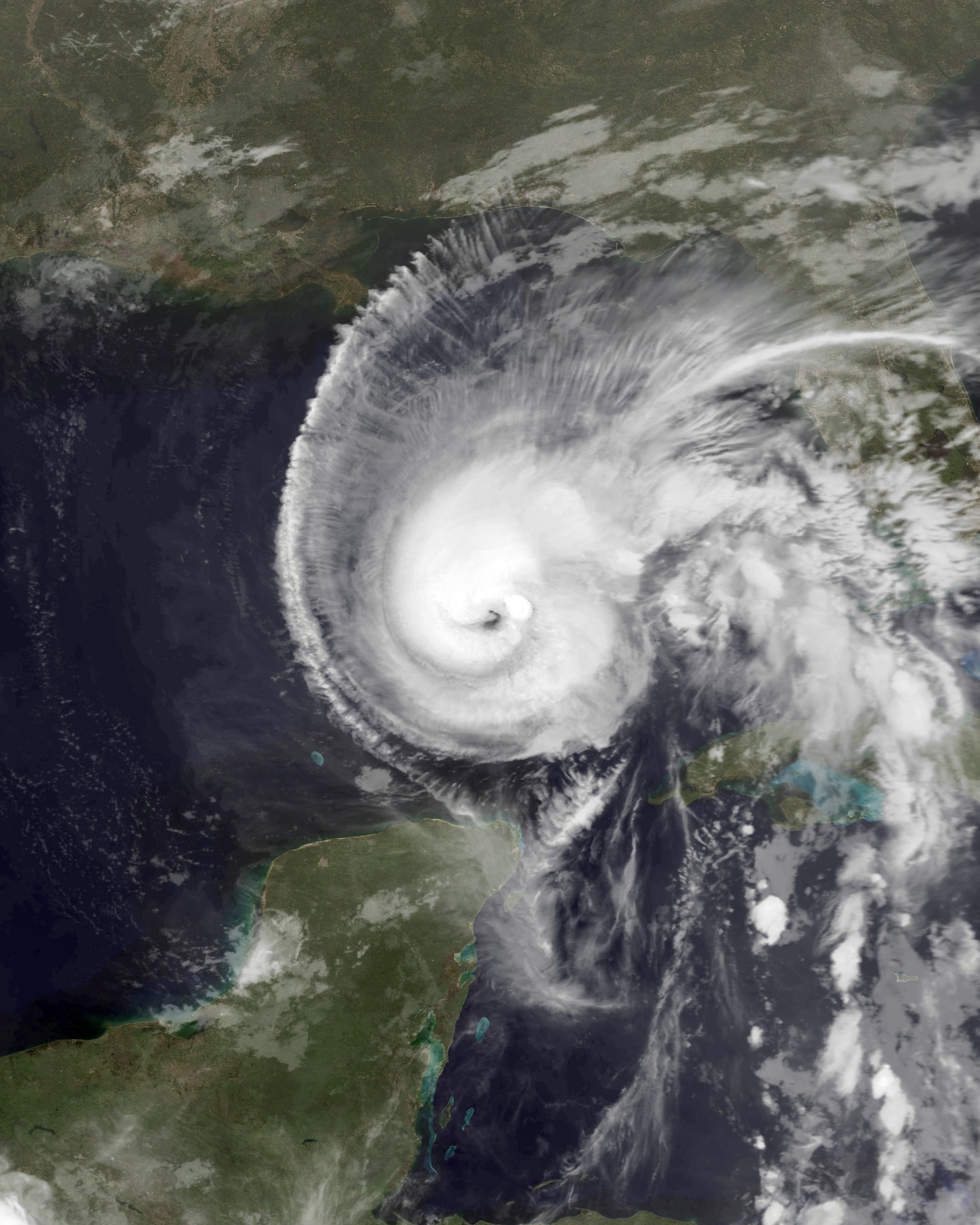
Hurricane Rafael north of the Yucatán Peninsula near peak intensity on November 8

- 06:00 UTC (12:00 a.m. CST) at 24.4°N 87.6°W – Hurricane Rafael re-intensifies to Category 3 strength about 255 mi (405 km) north-northeast of Progreso, Yucatán, and simultaneously attains its peak intensity, with maximum sustained winds of 120 mph (195 km/h) and a minimum central pressure of 954 mbar (28.17 inHg).
- 12:00 UTC (6:00 a.m. CST) at 24.4°N 88.4°W – Hurricane Rafael weakens again to Category 2 strength about 230 mi (370 km) north-northeast of Progreso.
- 18:00 UTC (12:00 p.m. CST) at 24.6°N 89.1°W – Hurricane Rafael weakens to Category 1 strength about 230 mi (370 km) north of Progreso.

November 9

- 06:00 UTC (12:00 a.m. CST) at 24.8°N 90.5°W – Hurricane Rafael weakens into a tropical storm about 245 mi (400 km) north-northwest of Progreso.

November 10

- 12:00 UTC (6:00 a.m. CST) at 26.1°N 91.9°W – Tropical Storm Rafael transitions into a post-tropical cyclone about 240 mi (390 km) south of Marsh Island, Louisiana, and degenerates into a trough of low pressure within six hours.

November 14

- 06:00 UTC (1:00 a.m. EST) at 15.9°N 81.1°W – A tropical depression forms from a large low-pressure area about 150 mi (240 km) east-northeast of the Honduras–Nicaragua border. (Note: Due to the threat the developing system posed to Nicaragua and Honduras, the National Hurricane Center initiated advisories on it, designating it Potential Tropical Cyclone Nineteen at 21:00 UTC (4:00 p.m. EST) on November 13.)
- 12:00 UTC (7:00 a.m. EST) at 15.8°N 82.2°W – The recently formed tropical depression strengthens into Tropical Storm Sara about 80 mi (130 km) east-northeast of the Honduras–Nicaragua border.

November 15

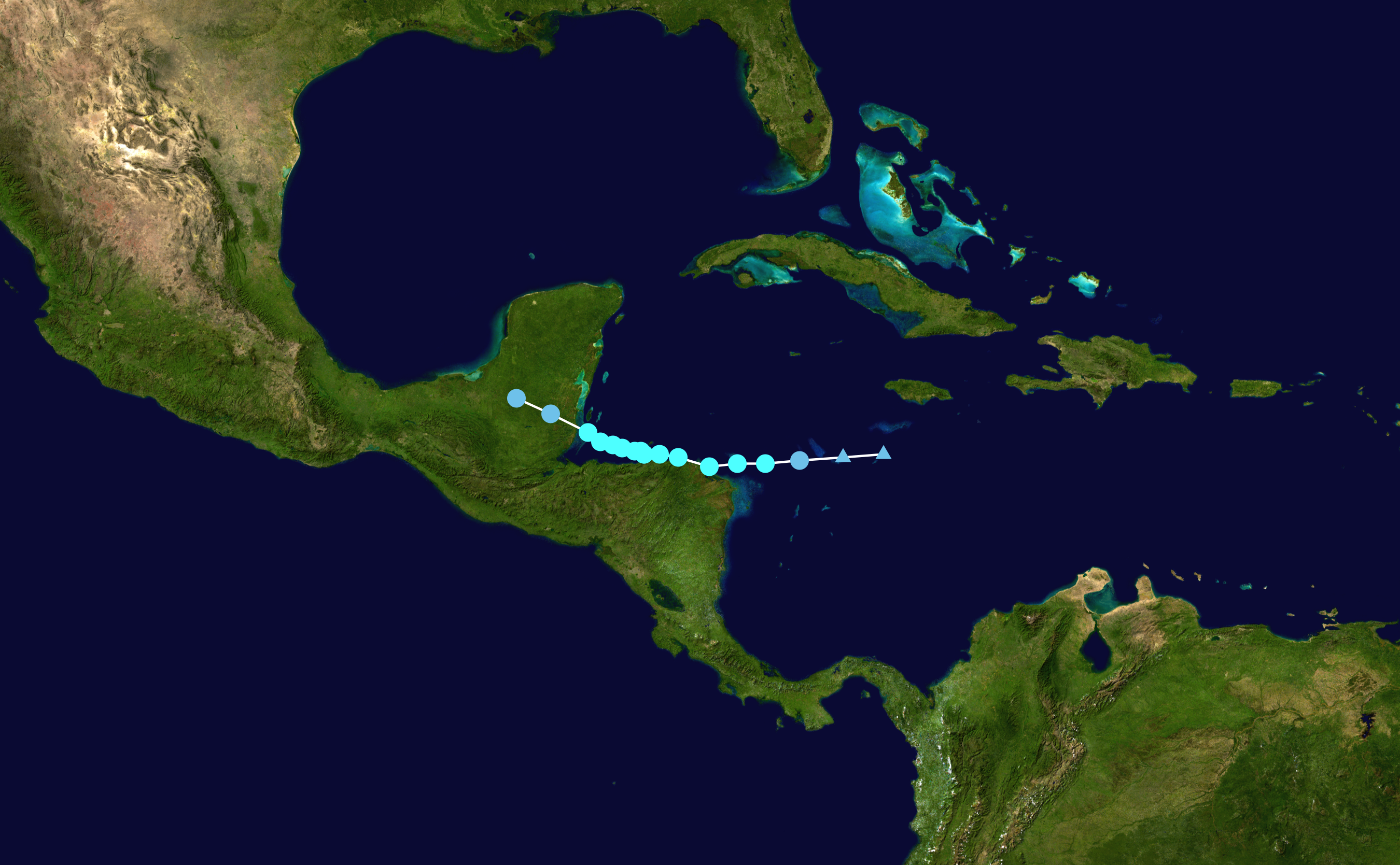
Storm path of Tropical Storm Sara

- 01:20 UTC (7:20 p.m. CST, November 14) at 15.8°N 84.3°W – Tropical Storm Sara makes its first landfall near Punta Patuca, Honduras, with maximum sustained winds of 45 mph (75 km/h) and a minimum central pressure of 999 mbar (29.50 inHg); it emerges back over the Caribbean Sea shortly thereafter.
- 12:00 UTC (6:00 a.m. CST) at 16.1°N 85.6°W – Tropical Storm Sara attains its peak intensity, with maximum sustained winds of 50 mph (85 km/h) and a minimum central pressure of 997 mbar (29.44 inHg), about 85 mi (140 km) west-northwest of Punta Patuca.

November 17

- 14:00 UTC (8:00 a.m. CST) at 17.0°N 88.3°W – Tropical Storm Sara makes its second and final landfall near Dangriga, Belize, with maximum sustained winds of 40 mph (65 km/h) and a minimum central pressure of 1001 mbar (29.56 inHg).
- 18:00 UTC (12:00 p.m. CST) at 17.4°N 89.1°W – Tropical Storm Sara weakens into a tropical depression inland about 65 mi (100 km) west-northwest of Dangriga.

November 18

- 00:00 UTC (6:00 p.m. CST, November 17) at 17.9°N 90.2°W – Tropical Depression Sara is last noted as a tropical cyclone inland about 145 mi (230 km) west-northwest of Dangriga, and dissipates within six hours.

November 30

- The 2024 Atlantic hurricane season officially ends.

== See also ==
- Timeline of the 2024 Pacific hurricane season
- Tropical cyclones in 2024
