= Tropical Storm Colin (2016) =

Atlantic tropical storm

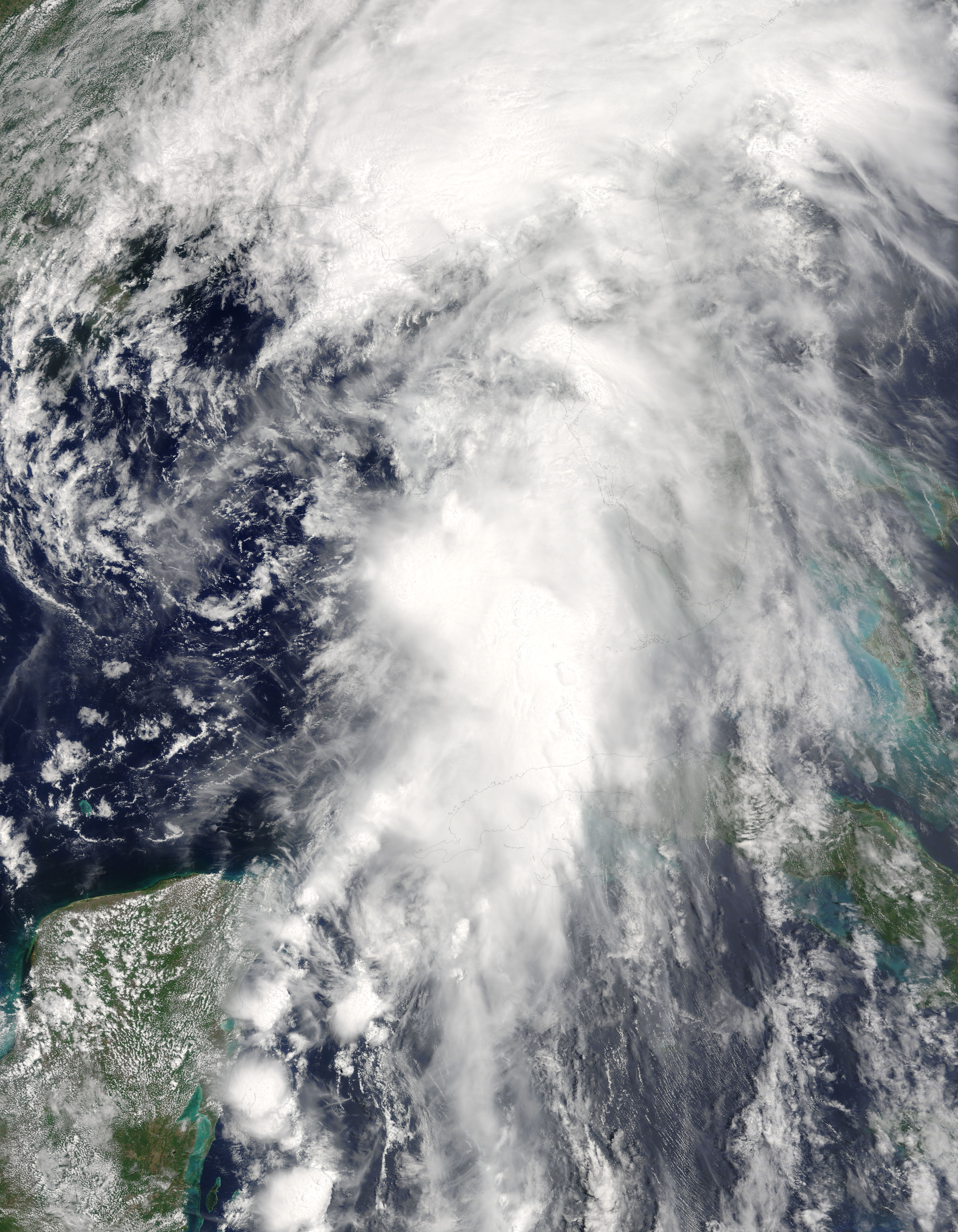
- Tropical Storm Colin approaching Florida on June 6

Meteorological history
- Formed: June 5, 2016
- Extratropical: June 7, 2016
- Dissipated: June 8, 2016

Tropical storm
- 1-minute sustained (SSHWS/NWS)
- Highest winds: 50 mph (85 km/h)
- Lowest pressure: 1001 mbar (hPa); 29.56 inHg

Overall effects
- Fatalities: 6 total
- Damage: $1.04 million (2016 USD)
- Areas affected: Yucatán Peninsula; Cuba; East Coast of the United States
- IBTrACS
- Part of the 2016 Atlantic hurricane season

Tropical Storm Colin was the earliest third named storm in the Atlantic basin on record for four years, until it was surpassed by Tropical Storm Cristobal in 2020. An atypical, poorly organized tropical cyclone, Colin developed from a low pressure area over the Gulf of Mexico near the northern coast of the Yucatán Peninsula late on June 5. Moving northward, the depression strengthened into a tropical storm about eight hours after its formation. On June 6, Colin curved to the north-northeast and intensified slightly to winds of 50 mph (80 km/h). Strong wind shear prevented further strengthening and resulted in the system maintaining a disheveled appearance on satellite imagery. Later, the storm began accelerating to the northeast. Early on June 7, Colin made landfall in Taylor County, Florida, still at peak intensity. The system rapidly crossed Northern Florida and emerged into the Atlantic Ocean several hours later. By late on June 7, Colin transitioned into an extratropical cyclone offshore North Carolina before being absorbed by a frontal boundary the following day.

Upon the development of Colin on June 5, a tropical storm warning was issued for much of the west coast of Florida, followed by tropical storm warnings and watches on Atlantic coast from Central Florida to North Carolina later on June 5 and June 6. Governor of Florida Rick Scott declared a state of emergency, while schools and colleges closed in several counties. The storm produced heavy rainfall over portions of Florida, resulting in flooding in some areas, especially Hillsborough and Pinellas counties. There, the freshwater flooding was compounded by coastal flooding from high tides. Winds caused over 93,300 power outages throughout the state. The storm spawned two tornadoes, one of which knocked down trees and damaged several cars and homes in Jacksonville. Four fatalities occurred in the Florida Panhandle due to drowning. Heavy rainfall was also observed in portions of Georgia, North Carolina, and South Carolina. Two additional drowning deaths occurred in Georgia. Damage throughout the East Coast reached $1.04 million (2016 USD).

== Meteorological history ==
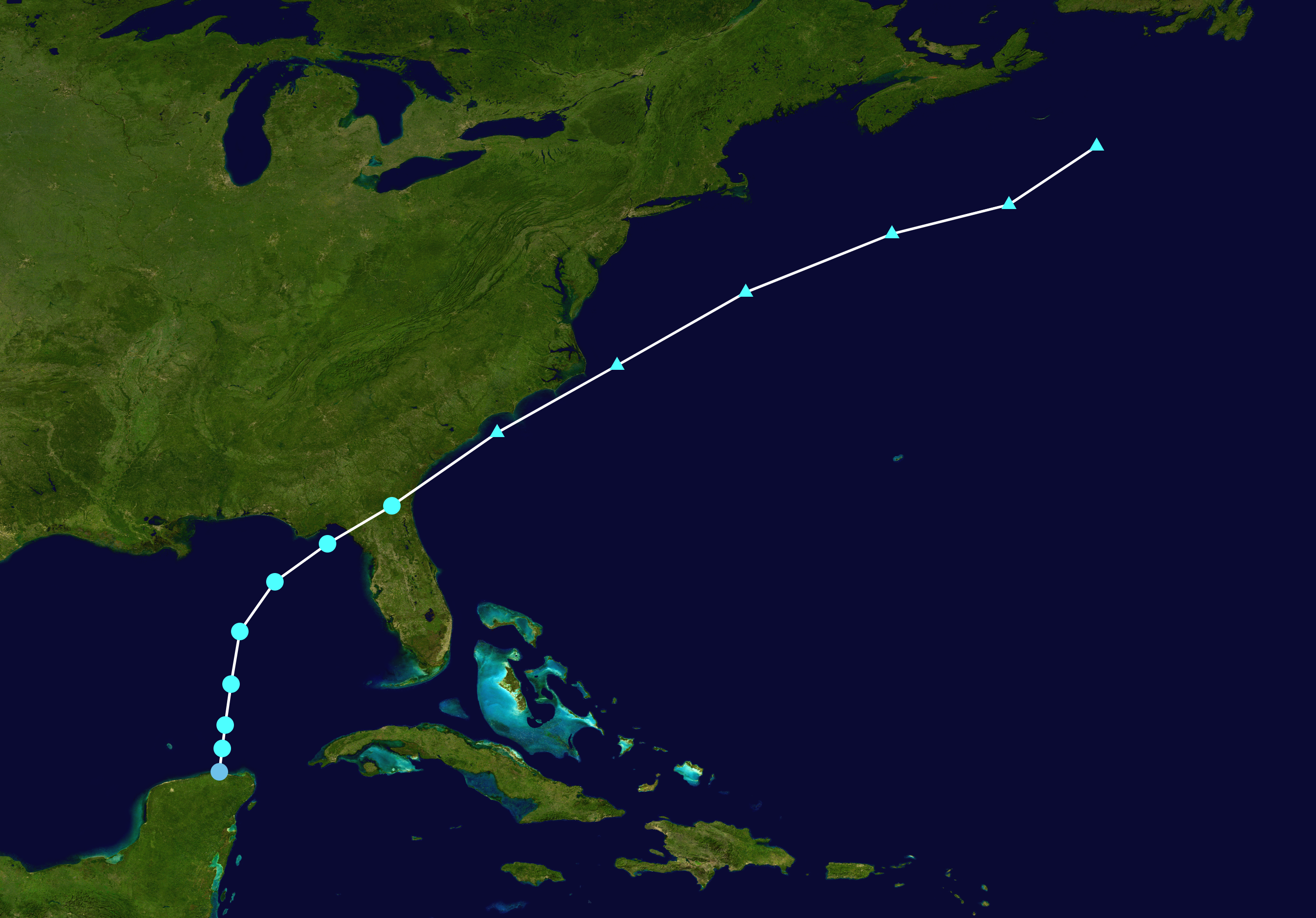
Map plotting the storm's track and intensity, according to the Saffir–Simpson scale Map key Saffir–Simpson scale Tropical depression (≤38 mph, ≤62 km/h) Tropical storm (39–73 mph, 63–118 km/h) Category 1 (74–95 mph, 119–153 km/h) Category 2 (96–110 mph, 154–177 km/h) Category 3 (111–129 mph, 178–208 km/h) Category 4 (130–156 mph, 209–251 km/h) Category 5 (≥157 mph, ≥252 km/h) Unknown Storm type Tropical cyclone Subtropical cyclone Extratropical cyclone, remnant low, tropical disturbance, or monsoon depression

The National Hurricane Center (NHC) issued a Tropical Weather Outlook (TWO) over the Gulf of Mexico and northern Yucatán Peninsula on June 1. The Two indicated the probability of the development of a low pressure area, which would have a 20% chance of becoming a tropical cyclone in the next five days. By June 3, a concentrated area of showers and thunderstorms developed in the western Caribbean Sea, resulting in an increasing probability of tropical cyclogenesis within 48 hours. Despite land interaction with the Yucatán Peninsula and unfavorably strong wind shear, the system reached an 80% chance of developing in the next 48 hours by early on June 5. It then moved inland over the Yucatán Peninsula, but continued to organize. After entering the Gulf of Mexico, the system developed a well-defined circulation, according to surface data and satellite imagery. Thus, the NHC upgraded it to on Tropical Depression Three at 12:00 UTC on June 5, while located just north of the Yucatán Peninsula. The northward-moving depression was lopsided, with the circulation being well to the west of an elongated band of deep convection.

Later that day, after a reconnaissance aircraft observed tropical storm force winds, the cyclone was upgraded to Tropical Storm Colin at 18:00 UTC. Colin became the earliest third tropical storm in the Atlantic basin, exceeding the previous record set by Tropical Storm Three on June 12, 1887. Despite the intensification, the storm remained poorly organized due to strong wind shear, with the low-level center being indistinguishable on infrared satellite imagery. Early on June 6, data from surface observations, the National Oceanic and Atmospheric Administration, and a reconnaissance aircraft flight suggested that two small-scale circulations existed. Shortly thereafter, NHC noted that the "satellite presentation of Colin does not resemble that of a classical tropical cyclone", as convection and strong winds were displaced well east of the center, primarily due to wind shear. The storm began accelerating to the northeast late on June 6 due to a mid- to upper-level trough over the Midwestern United States. Despite this, Colin was able to reach its peak intensity at 00:00 UTC on June 7, with maximum sustained winds of 50 mph (80 km/h) and a minimum atmospheric pressure of 1,001 mbar (29.6 inHg).

Two hours later, the cyclone made landfall in Keaton Beach, Florida, at peak intensity. Continuing rapidly northeastward, Colin quickly crossed North Florida and southern Georgia, reaching the Atlantic Ocean before 09:00 UTC. The storm appeared to be "not very tropical", though large areas of deep convection continued to exist to the east and southeast of the center. At 12:00 UTC on June 7, the system had frontal features and thus transitioned into an extratropical cyclone, just off the Carolinas coast.

== Preparations ==
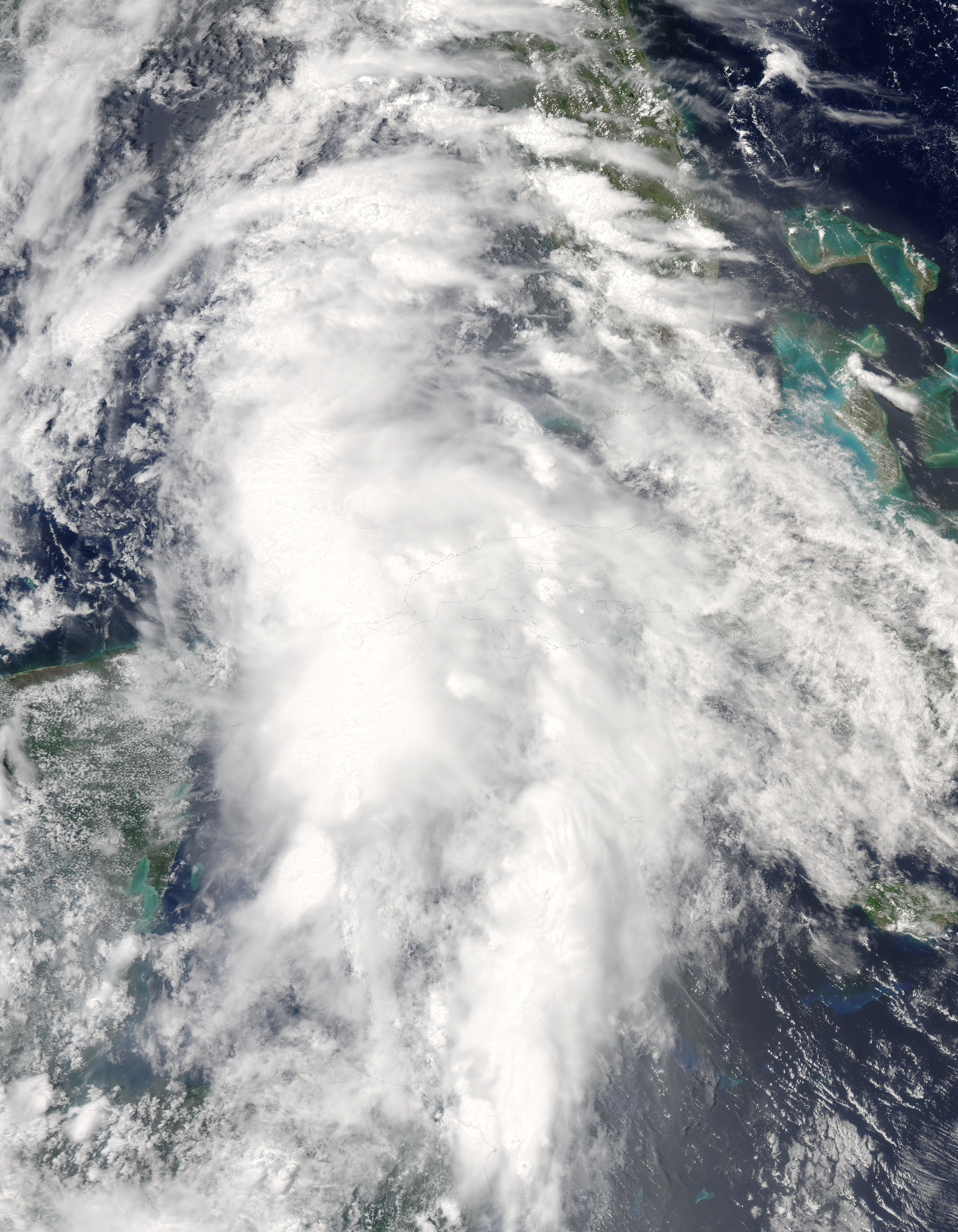
Tropical Storm Colin off the Yucatán Peninsula on June 5

Upon the development of Colin at 15:00 UTC on June 5, a tropical storm warning was issued on the west coast of Florida from Englewood to Indian Pass. Six hours later, a tropical storm watch was put into effect from the Flagler–Volusia county line on the east coast to Altamaha Sound in Georgia. Early on June 6, the tropical storm watch was upgraded to a tropical storm warning, which was extended southward to the Sebastian Inlet. Simultaneously, a new tropical storm watch was issued from Altamaha Sound to the South Santee River in South Carolina. The tropical storm watch was upgraded to a tropical storm warning by 18:00 UTC on June 6. After three hours, the tropical storm warning was extended northward to Oregon Inlet in North Carolina. At 09:00 UTC on June 7, the tropical storm warning on the Gulf Coast of Florida and the East Coast of the United States south of Altamaha Sound, Georgia, was discontinued. Three hours later, the tropical storm warning was canceled south of Surf City, North Carolina. By 18:00 UTC on June 7, the remaining portion of the tropical storm warning was discontinued.

On June 6, Governor of Florida Rick Scott declared a state of emergency for 34 counties and also prepared to deploy 6,000 Florida National Guard members, if necessary. All campuses of Seminole State College and University of Central Florida were closed on June 6, while the University of South Florida closed all three of its campuses after 3:00 p.m. EST. The Sunshine Skyway Bridge, which spans across Tampa Bay, was closed on June 6 due to high winds. In Manatee County, an elementary school in Holmes Beach closed for one day. School students in Pasco County were released early on June 6. Boat ramps in Levy County were closed, while schools in Cedar Key and Yankeetown had an early release day on June 6. Sandbags were available in several counties, including Alachua, Bradford, Citrus, Hernando, Highlands, Hillsborough, Lake, Manatee, Marion, Pasco, Pinellas, St. Johns, and Volusia.

In coastal Georgia, Liberty County schools, Armstrong State University, Savannah Technical College, closed early on June 6. The health departments in Bryan, Camden, Chatham, Effingham, Glynn, Liberty, Long, and McIntosh counties were also closed earlier than normal on that day. Military personnel and civilian employees at Fort Stewart and Hunter Army Airfield were ordered not to return until after the storm safely passed.

== Impact ==
The storm brought heavy rainfall and flooding to western Cuba, particularly Pinar del Río Province, where some locations recorded more than 7.9 inches (200 mm) of precipitation in 24 hours. San Juan y Martínez saw the highest total with 8.7 inches (220 mm). In low-lying and flood prone communities, authorities remained alert to the possibility of evacuations due to rivers beginning to overflow. Several roads were left impassable, while crops were damaged in some areas. Approximately 84,000 acres (34,000 hectares) of crops were flooded. Additionally, water service was disrupted and more than 6,770 customers lost electricity. Three homes in Old Havana suffered major damage and several others were impacted following multiple landslides. Heavy rainfall was largely seen as beneficial; multiple reservoirs received much-needed rain and their overall capacity reached 50 percent.

=== Florida ===
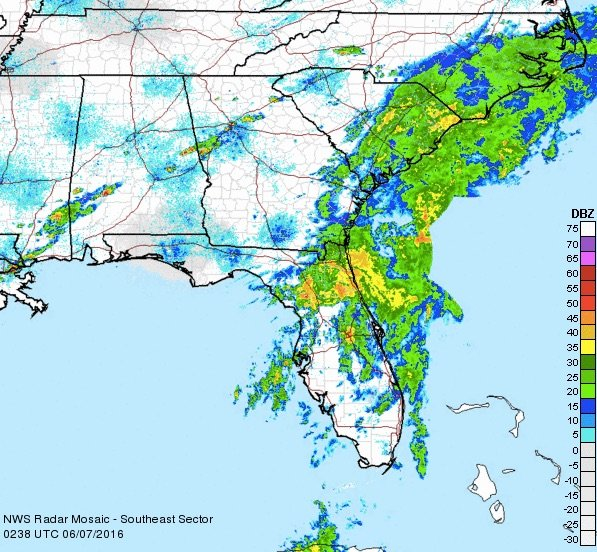
Radar image of Colin about 40 minutes after its landfall in Florida

The storm brought heavy rainfall to some areas of Florida, particularly North Florida and the Tampa Bay Area. Precipitation peaked at 17.54 in (446 mm) in Seminole in Pinellas County. Tropical storm force wind gusts were observed at several locations, though few locations reported sustained tropical storm force winds. At the New Smyrna Beach Municipal Airport, a sustained winds speed of 52 mph (84 km/h) was recorded, while a wind tower at the Kennedy Space Center observed a wind gust of 66 mph (106 km/h). Other strong wind gusts included 57 mph (92 km/h) in Bradenton and 63 mph (101 km/h) in Jacksonville. At the Tampa International Airport, there were 29 flight delays and 2 cancellations, while the Orlando International Airport reported sixty-four flight arrival and departure delays, as well as four cancellations.

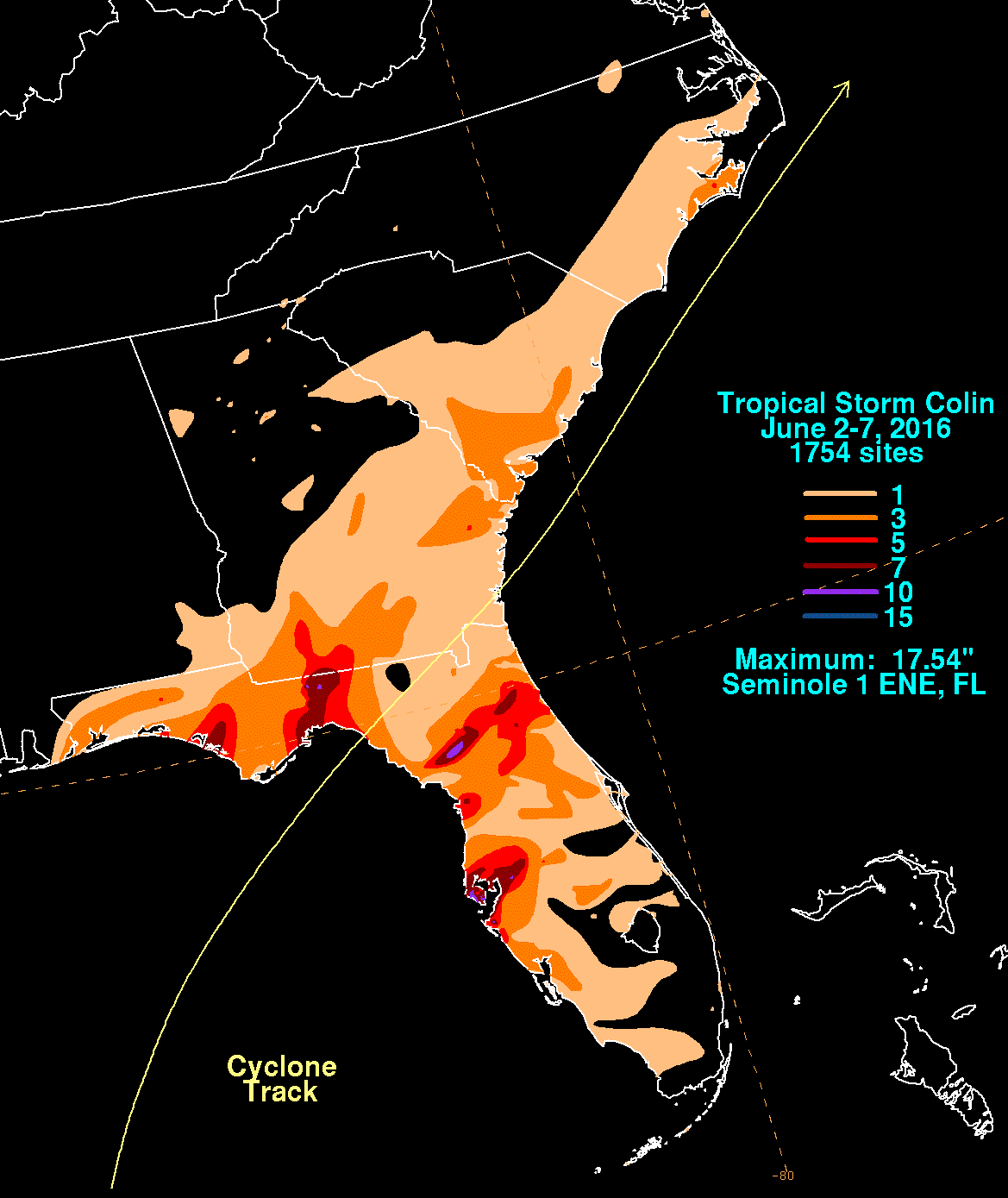
Rainfall totals from Tropical Storm Colin in the Southeastern United States

The heavy precipitation resulted in scattered reports of flooding throughout North and Central Florida. Many roads and intersections in at least a few counties were closed due to flooding, including in Alachua, Bradford, Hernando, Hillsborough, Pinellas, and St. Johns counties. Water entered a few businesses in Tampa at South Manhattan Avenue and El Prado Boulevard. In Pinellas County, a mobile home park in Clearwater was flooded, while water entered some homes in St. Pete Beach. Floodwaters overwhelmed the sewage system, forcing the city to pump partially treated sewage into Tampa Bay. Heavy rainfall in St. Petersburg resulted in water entering the hallway at St. Petersburg High School while school was in session. Overall, damage in the Tampa Bay area total $10,000. The south fork of Black Creek, located in Clay County, rose from 0.5 ft (0.15 m) to about 13.8 ft (4.2 m), but remained below flood stage. In St. Johns County, two sinkholes formed on the roads, while a culvert was washed out. Some areas were also impacted by storm surge and abnormally high tides. In Cedar Key, seven businesses and thirteen homes were flooded, while roads were inundated at the Cedar Keys National Wildlife Refuge. At least three people drowned along the Florida Panhandle due to rip currents, and a fourth remains missing but is presumed dead.

Power outages were reported throughout Central and North Florida, with over 93,300 customers losing electricity, including about 9,500 power outages between Tampa and Temple Terrace. In several counties, such as Alachua, Bradford, Duval, Flagler, Hardee, Martin, Orange, Putnam, and St. Lucie, impact was primarily limited to falling trees, which blocked roads, knocked down some power lines, or left generally minor damage to homes and vehicles. A few tornadoes and waterspouts were spawned during a storm. A waterspout was spotted offshore Lee County near Bonita Springs and Estero. An EF1 tornado on the Enhanced Fujita scale touched down near Jacksonville. The tornado snapped a number of pine and hardwood trees, while causing roof damage to some homes. At a Publix distribution center, three empty trucks were overturned. A possible tornado in Alachua County in the vicinity of Hawthorne toppled some trees and damaged a home.

=== Georgia and the Carolinas ===
In Georgia, two swimmers went missing while boating St. Andrew Sound. After a United States Coast Guard helicopter search of an over 1,150 sq mi (3,000 km^{2}) area, the bodies of both of them were located. The storm left wind damage in Glynn County. Five trees fell onto roads, while one tree each was reported striking a power line, a shed, and a vehicle. Several roads in Liberty County were washed out due to flooding, where 4.32 in (110 mm) of precipitation was observed at Hinesville. Further west in Thomasville, 5.27 in (134 mm) of rain fell on June 7, about 1.33 in (34 mm) above the city's monthly rainfall for June. In South Carolina, several roads were washed out in Jasper County and downtown Charleston. In North Carolina, rainfall in Dare County inundated portions of Highway 12 and nearby side roads, as well as adjacent low-lying areas. Similar impact occurred in Carteret County, where rainfall totals generally ranged from 2 to 4 in (51 to 102 mm).

== See also ==
- Tropical cyclones in 2016
- List of Florida hurricanes (2000–present)
- Other tropical cyclones named Colin
- Tropical Storm Alberto (2006) – took a similar path
- Tropical Storm Barry (2007)
- Tropical Storm Andrea (2013)
- Hurricane Hermine (2016) – Category 1 hurricane that took the same path just less than 3 months later
- Tropical Storm Philippe (2017) – similar storm that had a poorly organized structure in late October 2017
