= May 1982 Central America floods =

Pacific tropical storm in 1982

- Date: Late May 1982
- Location: Central America
- Deaths: 308 dead, 275 missing
- Property damage: At least $466 million (1982 USD)

In late May 1982, an extended period of heavy rain associated with a long-lived Central American gyre led to disaster. Particularly hard-hit were Honduras and Nicaragua where at least 308 people were killed. Throughout the two countries, 308 people were killed and total damage was at $466 million (1982 USD). In the aftermath of the storm, many programs provided relief to the victims.

== Impact and aftermath ==
Torrential rains fell across Central America for several days, and precipitation totals were as high as 23.3 in (590 mm) in some areas with a peak of 57.32 in (1,456 mm) in Chinandega. A red cross official stated that "Entire families were swept away by [flood waters] and we know nothing about them". Because all sewers in Nicaragua were damaged, the water was contaminated. Ninety percent of the banana crop and 60 percent of the corn crop was completely destroyed. Throughout the country, 108 people were killed, (10 of which drowned in floodwaters). Roughly 20,000 people were homeless and total damage was estimated at $365 million (1982 USD); damage to highways, factories, and farms exceeded $100 million. In the northern portion of the country, a mudslide buried three small mountain villages, leaving 270 missing and only 29 survivors. About 15,000 sought to two emergency shelters. Many bridges were damaged. Since the capital city of Leon was hardest hit, a disaster area was declared for the nearby area. The floods were considered the worst disaster in the country in three years.

Across Honduras, 200 people were killed and 5,000 people were without food or water in just 13 communities. A total of 80,000 people were homeless which were later housed in schools, churches, and health victims. Total damage was placed at $101 million (1982 USD).

On May 27, the governments of both Honduras and Nicaragua appealed for international aid. Soldiers quickly sent food and medical to at least 50 communities in both countries. A second appeal was made shortly afterwards, which proposed for $5.1 million in medicine and other supplies. The red cross and United Nations (UN) appealed for $3 million in international relief. The UN granted Nicaragua a month's worth of food supply, but officials feared that this would not be enough. The government of Cuba announced that they would send 12,000 construction workers as well as 2,000 teachers, doctors, and officials to Nicaragua. Canada donated $220,000 via the League of Red Cross Societies. To prevent an epidemic of diseases such as typhoid fever, the Health Ministry started a program to give out vaccines which costs $5.1 million. The U.S. Embassy in Managua provided $25,000 in donations. The U.S. Embassy in Honduras attempted to outline a fact-fining mission to assess the damage and provide relief.
