= Tropical Storm Philippe (2017) =

Atlantic tropical storm

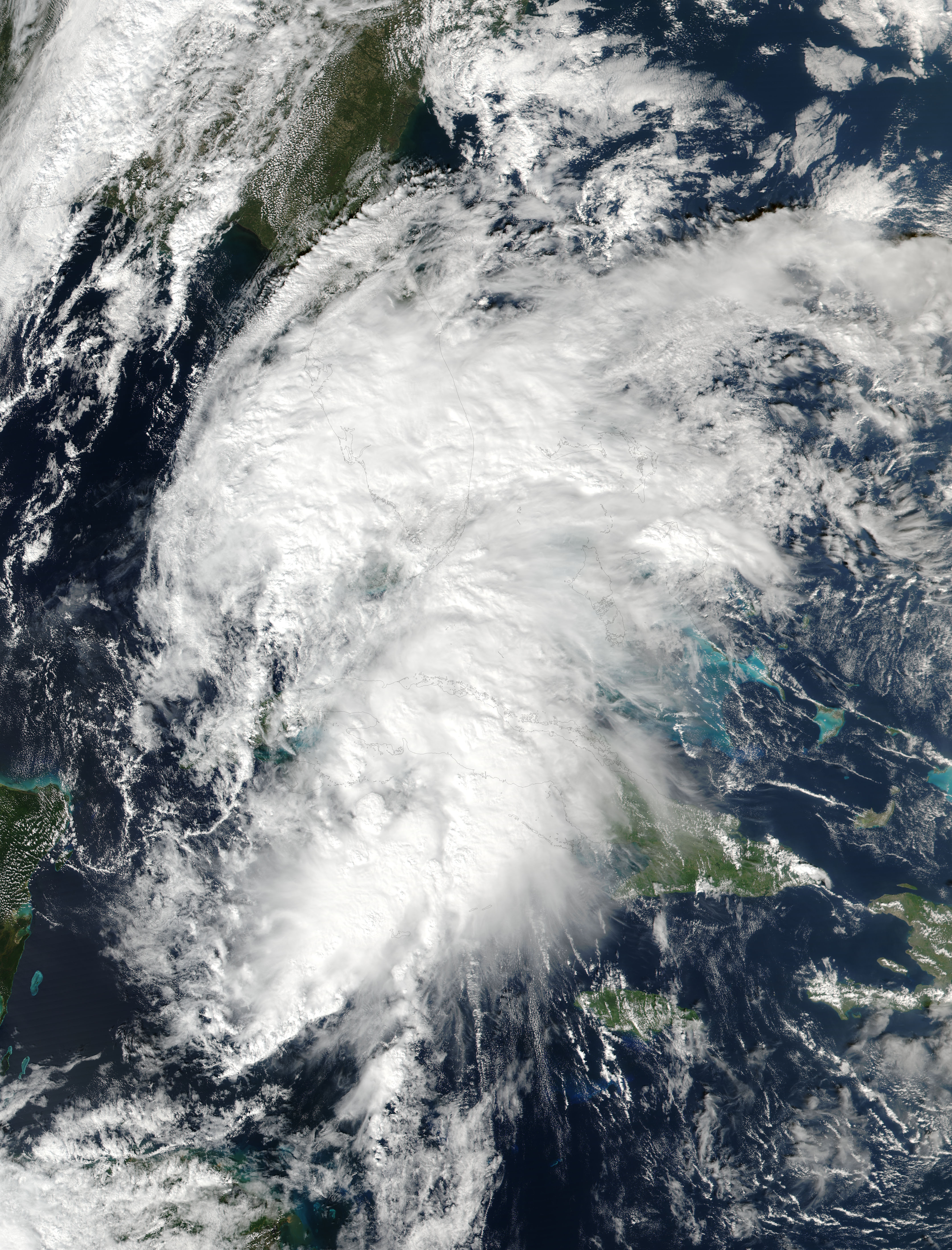
- Tropical Storm Philippe moving over Florida, Cuba, and the Bahamas on October 28

Meteorological history
- Formed: October 28, 2017
- Dissipated: October 29, 2017

Tropical storm
- 1-minute sustained (SSHWS/NWS)
- Highest winds: 40 mph (65 km/h)
- Lowest pressure: 1000 mbar (hPa); 29.53 inHg

Overall effects
- Fatalities: 5 total
- Damage: $100 million (2017 USD)
- Areas affected: Central America, Cayman Islands, Yucatán Peninsula, Cuba, East Coast of the United States
- IBTrACS
- Part of the 2017 Atlantic hurricane season

Tropical Storm Philippe was a weak, short-lived and disorganized tropical cyclone which affected Central America, Cuba, and Florida during October 2017. The sixteenth named storm of the extremely-active 2017 Atlantic hurricane season, Philippe originated from the interaction of a tropical wave which exited the coast of West Africa on October 16, and the Central American Gyre on October 24. This formed a broad area of low pressure the next day, that later organized into a tropical depression at 12:00 UTC on October 28. The depression strengthened into Tropical Storm Philippe just six hours later, before making landfall west of the Bay of Pigs in Cuba just a few hours later. Philippe quickly degraded into a tropical depression inland, before dissipating at 0:00 UTC the following day. The remnants later formed into a new low pressure area off the coast of Florida before merging with a cold front, later that same day.

== Meteorological history ==
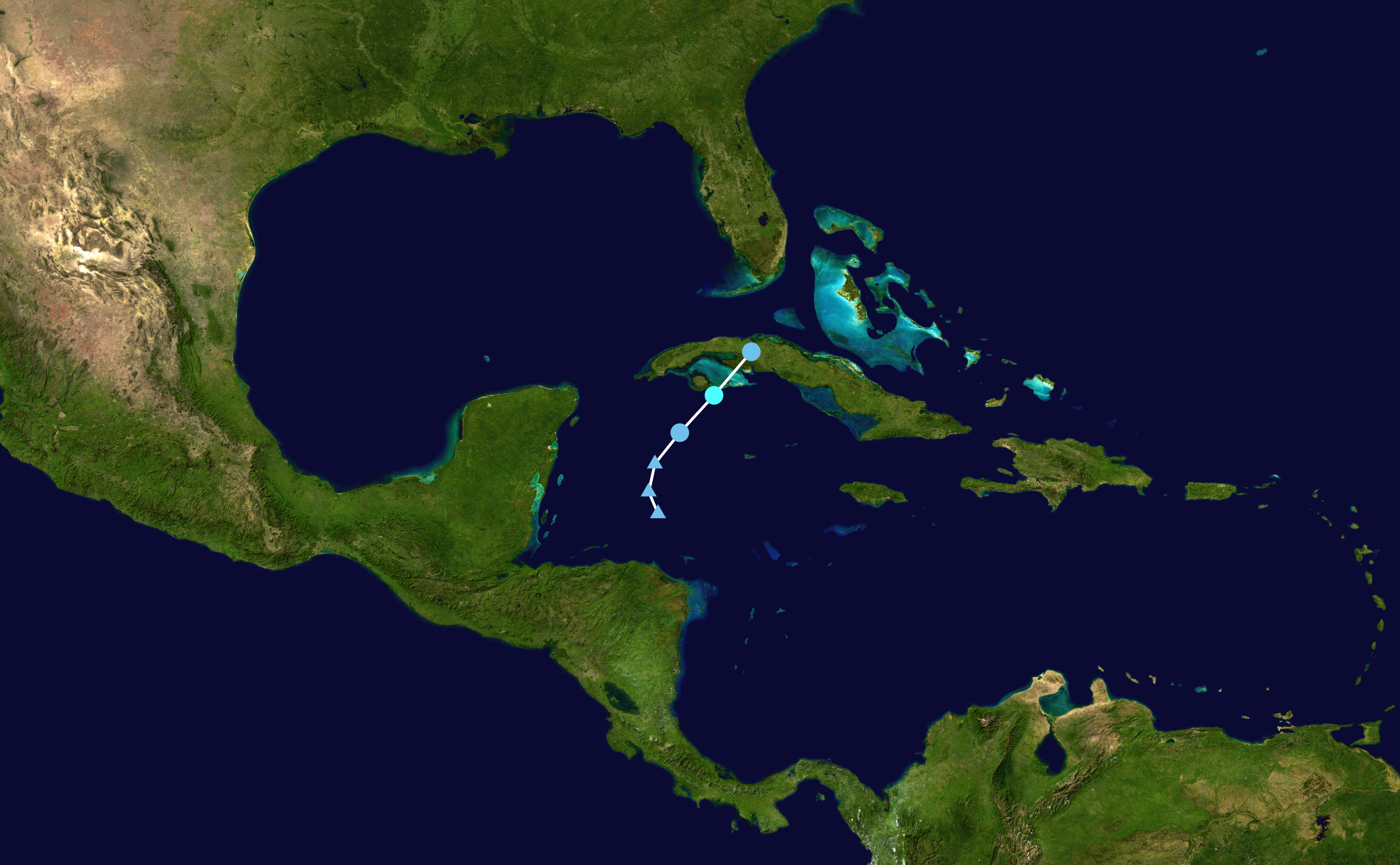
Map plotting the storm's track and intensity, according to the Saffir–Simpson scale Map key Saffir–Simpson scale Tropical depression (≤38 mph, ≤62 km/h) Tropical storm (39–73 mph, 63–118 km/h) Category 1 (74–95 mph, 119–153 km/h) Category 2 (96–110 mph, 154–177 km/h) Category 3 (111–129 mph, 178–208 km/h) Category 4 (130–156 mph, 209–251 km/h) Category 5 (≥157 mph, ≥252 km/h) Unknown Storm type Tropical cyclone Subtropical cyclone Extratropical cyclone, remnant low, tropical disturbance, or monsoon depression

Philippe originated from the interaction of a tropical wave and the Central American Gyre. A tropical wave moved off the coast of West Africa on October 16, and traversed westward across the tropical Atlantic. On October 22, the National Hurricane Center (NHC) began to note the possibility of tropical cyclogenesis over the southwestern Caribbean Sea. The disturbance reached the southwestern Caribbean by October 24, where it interacted with the Central American Gyre, developing a broad area of low pressure the following day just offshore Nicaragua. Convective activity associated with the low began to increase, as it began to drift gradually west-northwestward. On October 27, connective associated with the system became more concentrated as it moved near the northeastern coast of Honduras. At this time, Hurricane hunters reconnaissance aircraft found winds of around 35 mph (56 km/h) in the disturbance. However, the storm lacked a well-defined center, and thus it was not upgraded to tropical depression status. Late that day, the NHC designated the disturbance as Potential Tropical Cyclone Eighteen, while it was located roughly 415 miles (668 km) south-southwest of Havana, Cuba. Although, at 12:00 UTC the next day, satellite imagery and reconnaissance aircraft data displayed a well-defined center, prompting the upgraded of Eighteen to a tropical depression, about 100 miles (160 km) south-southwest of Isla de la Juventud.

Around this time, vertical wind shear affecting the system became more favorable for intensification. The depression also shifted towards the northeast due to a mid-latitude trough that moved into the Southeastern United States and western Gulf of Mexico. By 18:00 UTC that same day, the depression strengthened into Tropical Storm Philippe while just southeast of Isla de la Juventud. Its tropical storm status was shorted-lived, however, as it made landfall on the southern coast of the Zapata Peninsula, Cuba at 22:00 UTC. This combined with strong southwesterly wind shear caused Phillipe to quickly weaken to a tropical depression by 00:00 UTC on October 29 before dissipating shortly thereafter. It remnants moved quickly northeastward ahead of the trough and spawned a new non-tropical low-pressure area just hours after it dissipated. The low moved over South Florida and the central and northwestern Bahamas before being absorbed into a cold front at 12:00 UTC.

== Preparations and impact ==
=== Central America and Cayman Islands ===
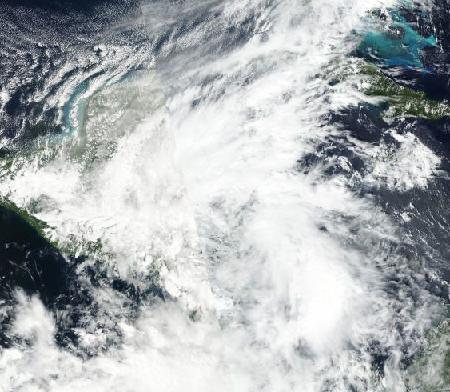
The precursor to Tropical Storm Philippe paralleling the coast of Central America on October 25

Potential Tropical Cyclone Eighteen, and its precursor which paralleled the coast of Central America, brought heavy rainfall to Nicaragua and Honduras. Due to these rains, the entire country of Nicaragua was placed under a yellow alert on October 24. This was later upgraded into a red alert by October 27 for portions of the country. The intense rainfall caused by the system in Nicaragua overflowed rivers, which damaged bridges and streets. Thousands of people had to be evacuated to safety as a result of floods. Widespread power outages were reported across several departments. More than 2,317 residences were inundated by floodwaters, with 30 destroyed. Over 17,450 were left without access to drinking water. A total of five fatalities occurred due to the floods in Nicaragua; four artisan miners who drowned after the well they worked in flooded, and a 15-year-old child who fell into a ravine.

In the Cayman Islands, Philippe prompted a Tropical Storm Warning for the territory.

=== Cuba and the Bahamas ===
Heavy rain fell across Cuba and the Bahamas in relation to the storm. In the Bahamas, a wind gust of 51 mph (82 km/h) was recorded at Settlement Point, with sustained winds reaching 35 mph (56 km/h).

=== United States ===
==== Florida ====
Ahead of Philippe, a Tropical Storm Watch was put in effect from Craig Key to Golden Beach in South Florida, at 15:00 UTC on October 28. The watch was later discontinued early the next day, as Philippe was no longer deemed a threat to the region. Residents in the path of the storm were advised to prepare for heavy rainfall. Initially, Philippe was thought to have made landfall in Florida, although it was later revealed in the post-season analysis that the storm had already dissipated, with its track being confused with a nearby area of low pressure. Had Philippe actually made landfall in the state, it would have been the first November tropical cyclone to do so since Hurricane Mitch in 1998.

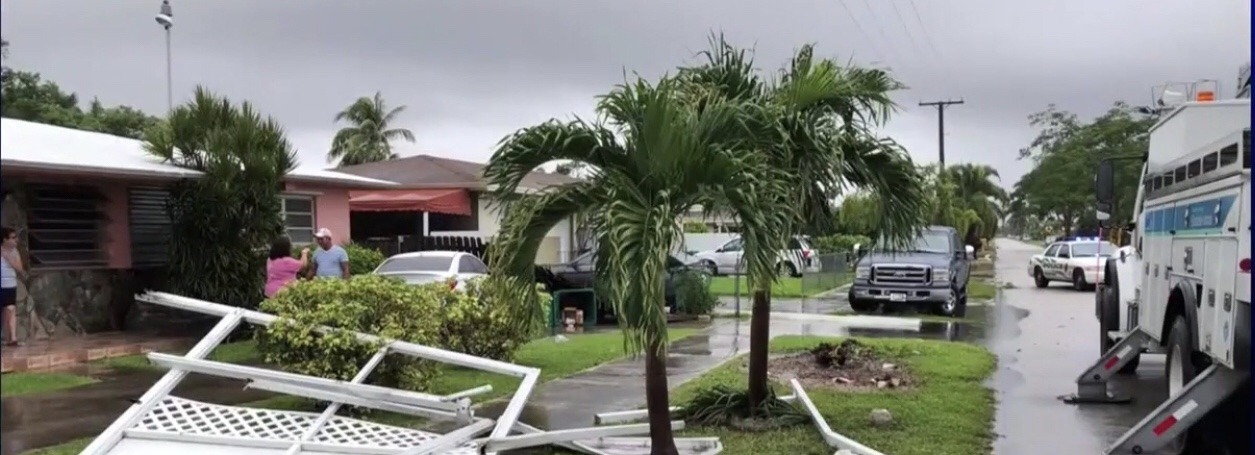
Damage from one of the tornadoes Philippe spawned in Westchester, Florida

Heavy rainfall and flash flooding was reported in parts of South Florida, prompting Flood Watches for Broward, Miami-Dade, and Palm Beach counties which were previously devastated by Hurricane Irma. A peak precipitation accumulation of 10.93 inches (278 mm) was reported in Aberdeen. Philippe also brought gusty winds to the area, with a peak wind gust of 47 mph (76 km/h) being recorded at the Dania Beach Pier on October 29. Minor tree damage was reported across the Miami metropolitan area due to tropical storm-force gusts. A total of three tornadoes were reported in Florida due to the storm. An EF0 tornado was reported in Westwood Lakes, which affected a shopping center and neighborhood. Tree limbs fell onto cars at the Bird Bowl Shopping Center, damaging a windshield. The shopping center also lost electricity during the tornado. The front window of a CosmoProf Salon Supply shop was shattered, with the roof of the store being torn off. The roof of a nearby bowling alley was also damaged, letting water pour into meeting and mechanical rooms, and shifting a dumpster behind the building. The bowling alley was forced to close for a day, to allow employees to cleanup damage. The tornado also damaged the Westchester neighborhood, downing trees, utility lines, and fences. Minor damage to roofs and siding was also reported. Florida Power & Light rushed to restore electricity to the shopping center and neighborhood, following the tornado.

A second EF0 tornado occurred in Boynton Beach that caused minor roof damage at several residences and broke a streetlight. Two vacant mobile homes were also damaged by the storm, one had its roof blown off and tossed hundreds of yards away, while the other had blown out windows. A third EF0 tornado occurred in Lake Clarke Shores, that damaged power and cable lines, fences, and downed trees. A wind gust of 75 mph (121 km/h) was reported on the Forest Hill Community High School campus as the tornado moved into West Palm Beach, with a nearby street sign being blown down. Heavy rains from the storm overwhelmed a water treatment plant that served the cities of Palm Beach and West Palm Beach, spilling 1.2 million gallons (4.5 million liters) of sewage water into a retention basin. However, no casualties or monetary damages were reported in Florida.

==== Elsewhere ====
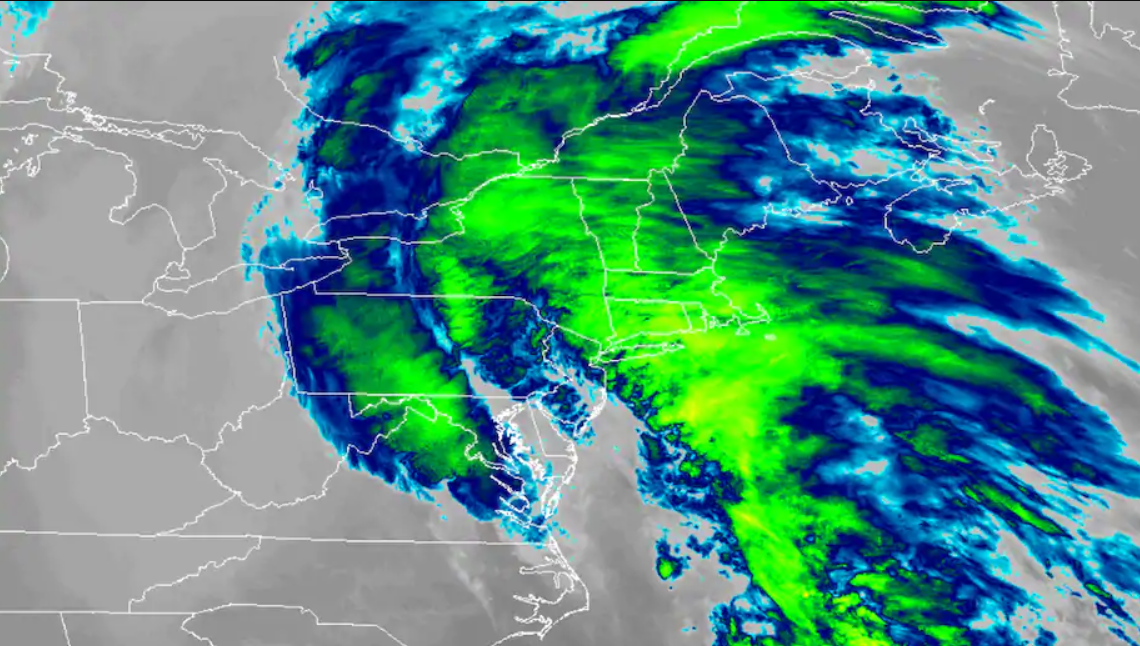
GOES-16 water vapor imagery of the remnants of Philippe being absorbed into a nor'easter affecting the Northeastern United States on October 30

The remnants of Tropical Storm Philippe merged with a mid-latitude system, developing a low pressure system, which forced the coldfront that Philippe had also been absorbed into through New England, along with moisture from Philippe. In Connecticut, heavy downpours caused a stream to overflow its banks, shutting down a road in Bristol. Portions of Connecticut received up to 6 inches (150 mm) of precipitation from the storm system. High winds also affected the state, toppling numerous trees in Danielson. Strong winds in Newtown downed utility lines and caused a tree to fall onto a house, severely damaging a garage. Public schools in the town were closed due to weather conditions. A tree collapsed onto a residence in Wethersfield, fortunately causing no casualties. Total damage in Connecticut reached $21,000 (2017 USD).

== See also ==
- Weather of 2017
- Tropical cyclones in 2017
- Other tropical cyclones named Philippe
- Hurricane Irene (1999) — took a nearly identical track to Philippe's initial path.
- Hurricane Michelle (2001) — took a similar track.
- Hurricane Paloma (2008) — heavily affected similar areas.
- Tropical Storm Nicole (2010) — took a nearly identical track.
- Tropical Storm Selma (2017) — affected Central America just days after Philippe, worsening floods.
