= List of storms named Selma =

The name Selma has been used for four tropical cyclones worldwide, three in the Eastern Pacific and one in the Australian region.

In the Eastern Pacific:

- Tropical Storm Selma (1970) – strong late-season storm that formed near Baja California, moved erratically near the coast before dissipating
- Tropical Storm Selma (1987) – weak storm that posed no threat to land
- Tropical Storm Selma (2017) – minimal tropical storm that made landfall in El Salvador, causing minor damage

In the Australian Region:

- Cyclone Selma (1974) – Category 3 severe tropical cyclone that briefly threatened land but turned away
