= Central American gyre =

Broad rainy season low-pressure system

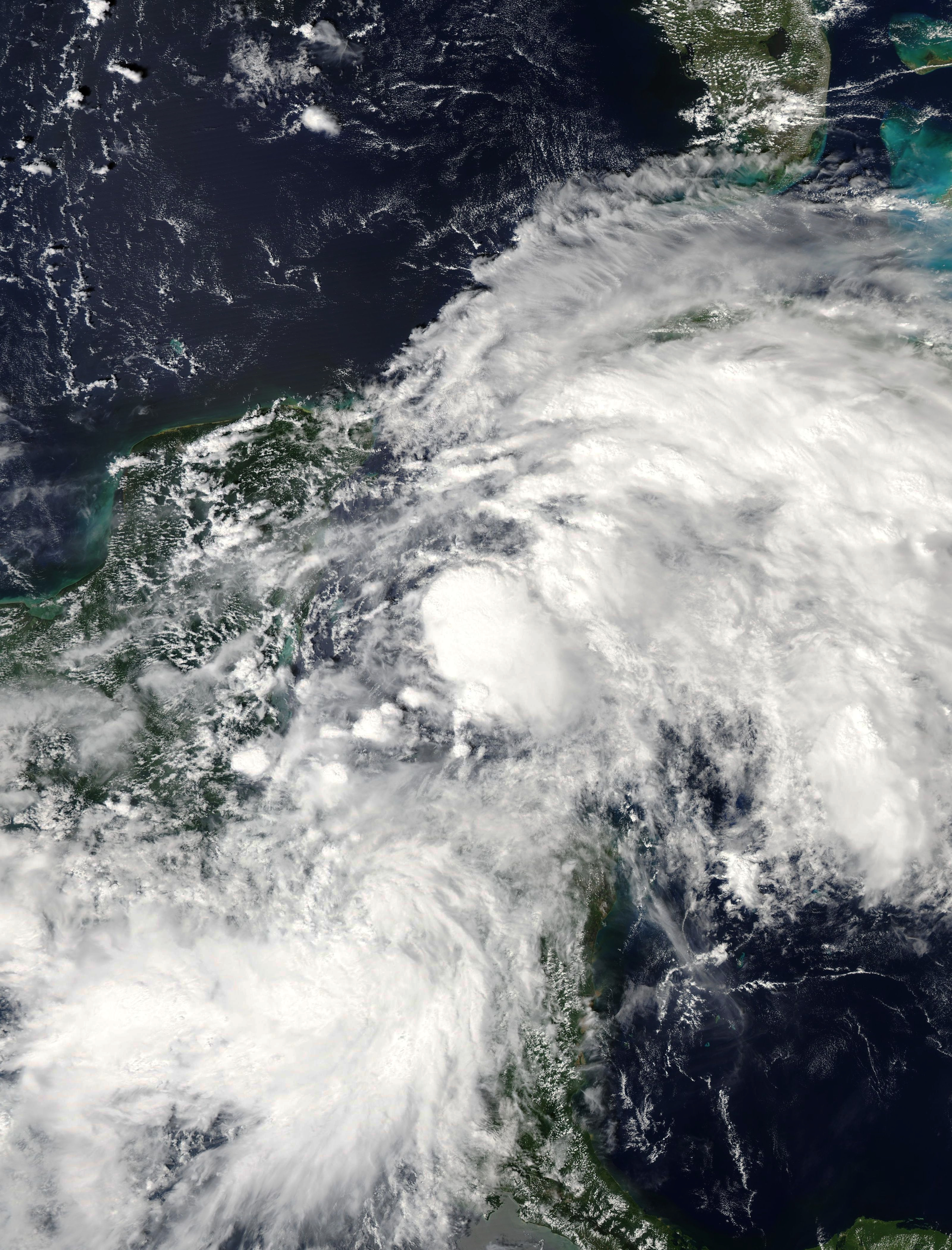
Central American gyres can produce tropical cyclones (precursor to Hurricane Michael shown).

The Central American gyre (CAG) is a broad and seasonal area of low pressure that occurs over the eastern Pacific Ocean and western Caribbean Sea. It primarily develops annually during the region's rainy season between May and November, and most commonly occurs during late spring (May–June) and early fall (October–November). CAGs are a type of monsoonal low and share similarities with monsoonal lows in other oceanic basins. The broad counterclockwise circulation of winds associated with CAGs is weak. CAGs may span across hundreds of miles, potentially covering parts of the eastern Pacific Ocean, southern Gulf of Mexico, and western Caribbean Sea.

CAGs are also slow-moving and can last on the order of days to weeks as they move over Central America and persistently generate inclement weather. Consequently, with the aid of the nearby ocean waters, CAGs can produce prolific amounts of rainfall over Central America, presenting a risk for flash floods and mudslides. The terrain of Central America may influence the development and organization of the showers and thunderstorms associated with CAGs. On average, precipitation associated with CAGs most commonly occurs along the coast of Central America. Tropical cyclones over the western Caribbean Sea and southern Gulf of Mexico may draw moisture from a nearby CAG, enhancing the amount of rainfall they produce. The presence of a CAG may also push rainfall associated with tropical cyclones in the southern Gulf of Mexico towards the south and west.

== Development and structure ==
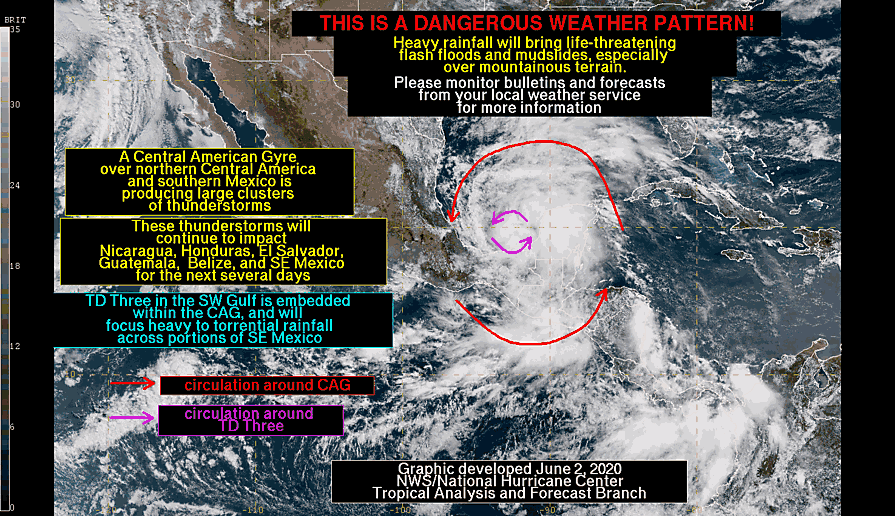
CAGs are broad circulations and present risks for flash floods and mudslides over Central America, as shown by Tropical Storm Cristobal just before formation on June 2, 2020.

The prevailing winds across the tropical eastern Pacific and Atlantic tend to blow from the east. However, the emergence of northwesterly winds over Central America can lead to the development of a CAG as the climatological wind pattern is interrputed. CAGs arise more frequently in the fall than the spring when the easterly trade winds are more relaxed, with the frequency of CAGs maximized in October. This interruption of the climatological trade winds tends to occur more frequently during certain phases of the Madden–Julian oscillation when storms are more abundant over Central America. The weakening of easterlies can produce cyclonic flow over Central America and enable CAG formation. Localized vorticity produced by breaks in the Central American terrain such as the Chivela Pass, Gulf of Panama, and Gulf of Papagayo may also contribute to the evolution of CAGs. The rarity of CAGs during the summer is associated with the concurrent lack of northwesterly flow over the Gulf of Mexico. One analysis identified 47 CAGs occurring between 1980 and 2010, corresponding to roughly 1.5 CAGs per year.

Most CAGs exhibit a barotropic structure, occurring in tandem with an anticyclone in the upper-troposphere atop the gyre. This class of CAGs is associated with enhanced moisture and precipitation around the center of the gyre. Less frequently, a CAG may exhibit a baroclinic structure and occur in tandem with a trough in the upper-troposphere. The regions of anomalous moisture and precipitation associated with these CAGs are concentrated east of the gyre's center.

== Influence on tropical cyclogenesis ==
CAGs consist of smaller vortices that rotate about the broader gyre. These localized areas of low pressure are associated with stronger thunderstorms and can generate pockets of higher vorticity. They often result from the interaction between the gyre and a passing tropical wave. A vortex may consolidate into a tropical cyclone in either the eastern Pacific or western Atlantic and detach from the gyre if the environment is conducive to tropical cyclone development. This occurs about once every other year on average, and tropical cyclone development occurs in tandem with around half of all CAGs. Tropical cyclogenesis typically occurs on the northeastern periphery of the gyre, with the resulting tropical cyclone tracking counterclockwise along with the flow about the gyre.

Due to the prevalence of CAGs either early or late in the hurricane season when sea surface temperatures are lower and upper-tropospheric winds are higher, the tropical cyclones associated with CAGs tend to be weaker than those occurring during the peak of the hurricane season. However, suitable conditions can facilitate the development of stronger storms; for example, Hurricane Michael made landfall as a Category 5 hurricane after forming in association with a CAG. CAGs can also help produce tropical cyclones in the eastern Pacific and western Atlantic simultaneously. In May and June 2020, a CAG contributed to the formation of Tropical storms Amanda and Cristobal in the eastern Pacific and Gulf of Mexico. The complex weather patterns associated with CAGs presents difficulties for weather models to predict tropical cyclone formation. The Global Forecast System operated by the National Centers for Environmental Prediction tends to erroneously depict the development of tropical cyclones in the western Caribbean in part due to the complexities associated with CAGs.
