= Tropical Storm Selma (2017) =

Pacific tropical storm in 2017

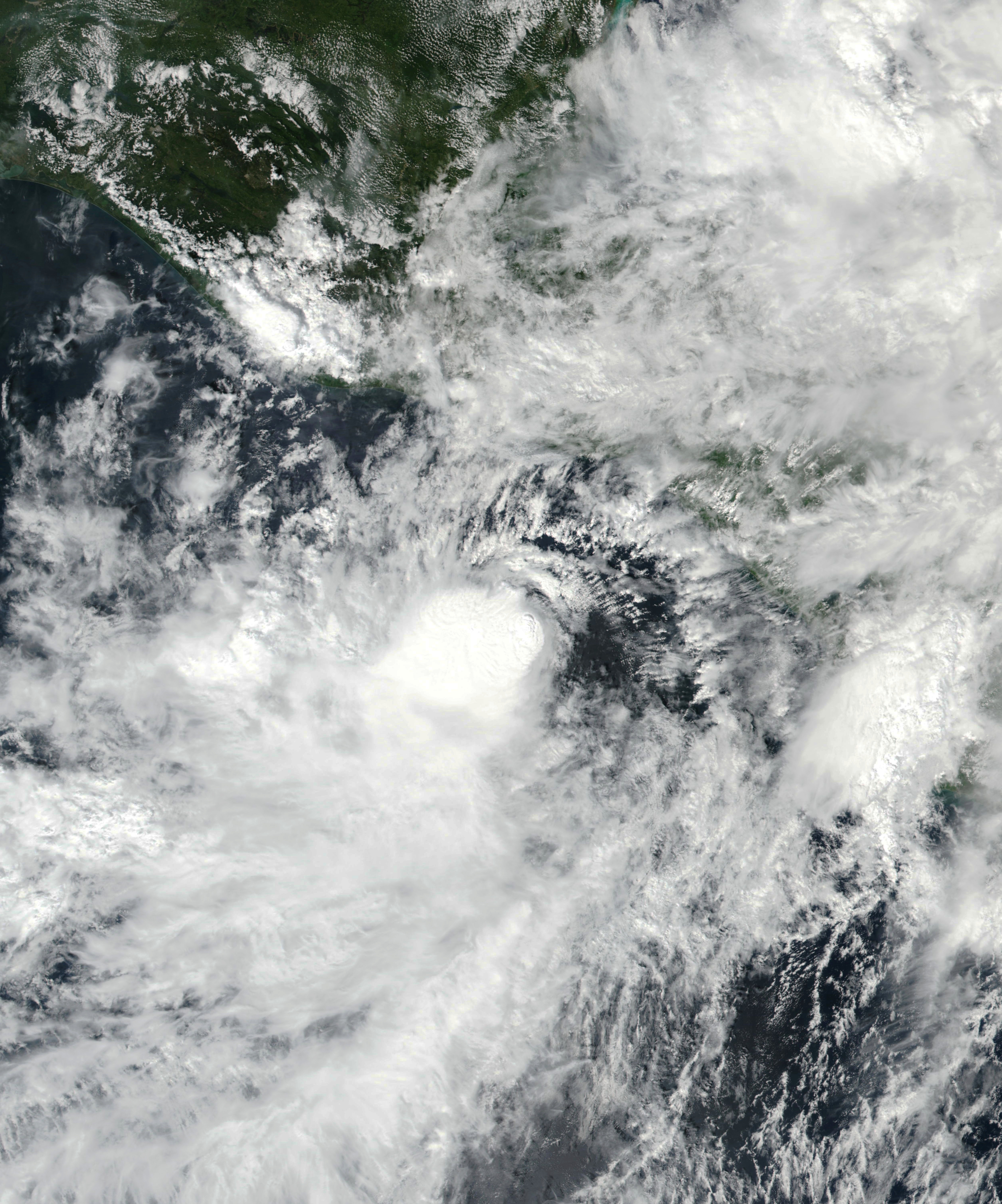
- Tropical Storm Selma nearing El Salvador on October 27

Meteorological history
- Formed: October 27, 2017
- Dissipated: October 28, 2017

Tropical storm
- 1-minute sustained (SSHWS/NWS)
- Highest winds: 40 mph (65 km/h)
- Lowest pressure: 1004 mbar (hPa); 29.65 inHg

Overall effects
- Fatalities: 17 total
- Damage: Unknown
- Areas affected: El Salvador, Honduras, Nicaragua
- IBTrACS /
- Part of the 2017 Pacific hurricane season

Tropical Storm Selma was the first tropical storm on record to make landfall in El Salvador. The twentieth tropical cyclone and eighteenth named storm of the 2017 Pacific hurricane season, Selma formed from a Central American gyre on October 27. The storm tracked northeastward and reached its peak intensity as a minimal tropical storm before making landfall east of San Salvador, El Salvador early on October 28. Selma rapidly weakened after making landfall, and its remnant circulation dissipated overland at 18:00 UTC on the same day.

In anticipation of the storm's arrival, tropical storm warnings and watches were issued for the coast of El Salvador and the Pacific coast of Guatemala. Heavy rainfall associated with the storm and a cold front resulted in flash-flooding and mudslides that caused minor damage in El Salvador. The storm also caused 17 fatalities in Honduras and Nicaragua, where heavy rainfall caused flooding and mudslides as 13 rivers topped their banks.

== Meteorological history ==
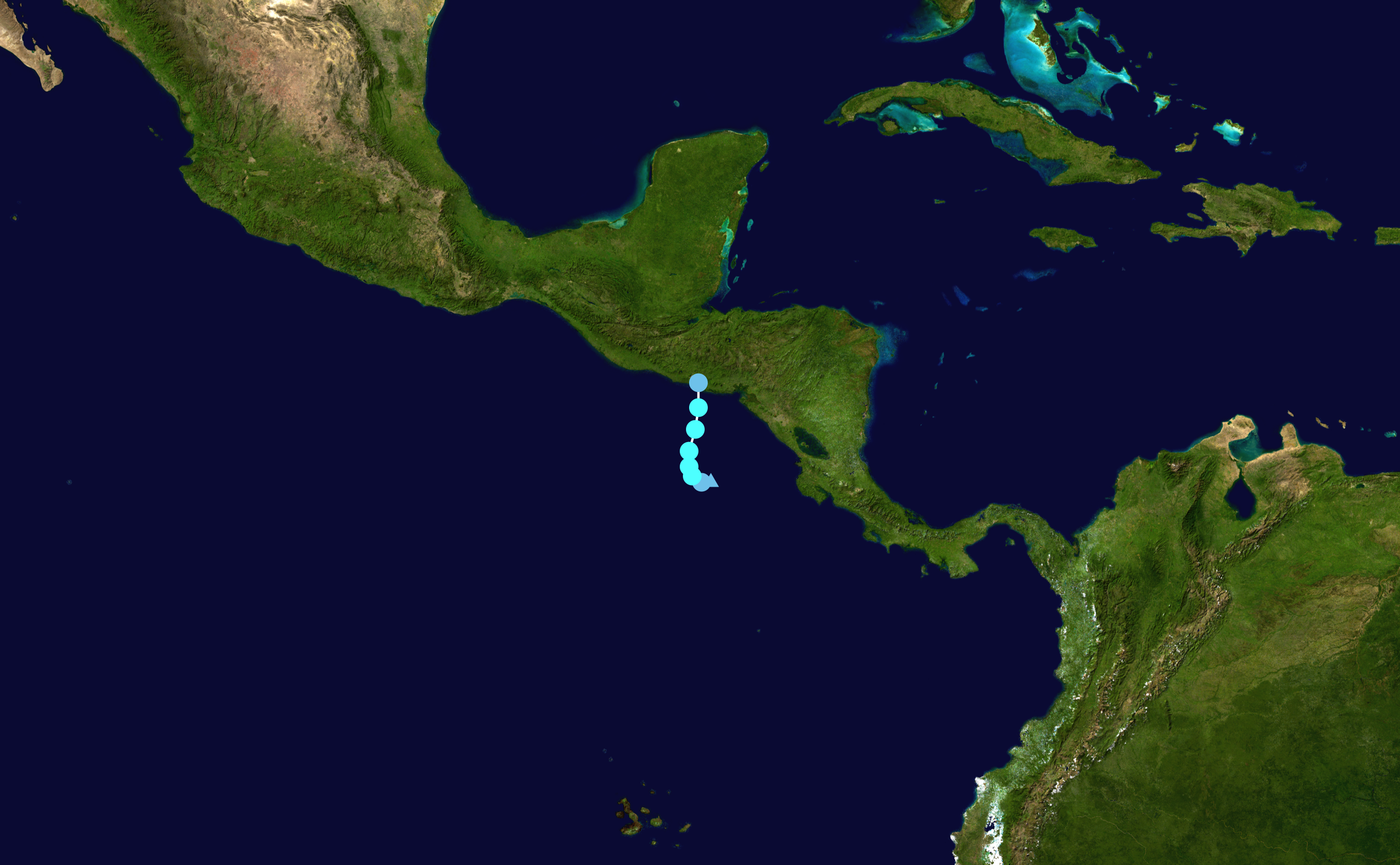
Map plotting the storm's track and intensity, according to the Saffir–Simpson scale Map key Saffir–Simpson scale Tropical depression (≤38 mph, ≤62 km/h) Tropical storm (39–73 mph, 63–118 km/h) Category 1 (74–95 mph, 119–153 km/h) Category 2 (96–110 mph, 154–177 km/h) Category 3 (111–129 mph, 178–208 km/h) Category 4 (130–156 mph, 209–251 km/h) Category 5 (≥157 mph, ≥252 km/h) Unknown Storm type Tropical cyclone Subtropical cyclone Extratropical cyclone, remnant low, tropical disturbance, or monsoon depression

A Central American Gyre — the same one that spawned Tropical Storm Philippe in the Atlantic basin — formed over Central America on October 24. A small area of disturbed weather developed in the wake of the gyre over the eastern Pacific Ocean off the coasts of Costa Rica and Nicaragua late on October 25. Satellite data indicated that the disturbance had developed a well-defined center of circulation around 18:00 UTC on October 26. By 00:00 UTC the following day, deep convection had become sufficiently organized within the disturbance, and it strengthened into a tropical depression. At 06:00 UTC, the depression strengthened into Tropical Storm Selma. After being classified as a tropical storm, Selma turned to the north-northwest in the flow between a mid-level ridge to its northeast and a trough over the Gulf of Mexico. A compact tropical cyclone, Selma was initially expected to strengthen due to warm waters and light to moderate wind shear in its path, but the cyclone ended up strengthening little after northeasterly wind shear strengthened, which also caused most of the deep convection to be displaced to the southwest of the storm's center. At around 11:00 UTC on October 28, Selma made landfall near Playa El Pimental in El Salvador with maximum sustained winds of 40 mph (65 km/h). The storm rapidly weakened to a tropical depression over the rugged terrain of El Salvador, and by 18:00 UTC the same day, the circulation of Selma had completely dissipated.

== Preparations and impact ==
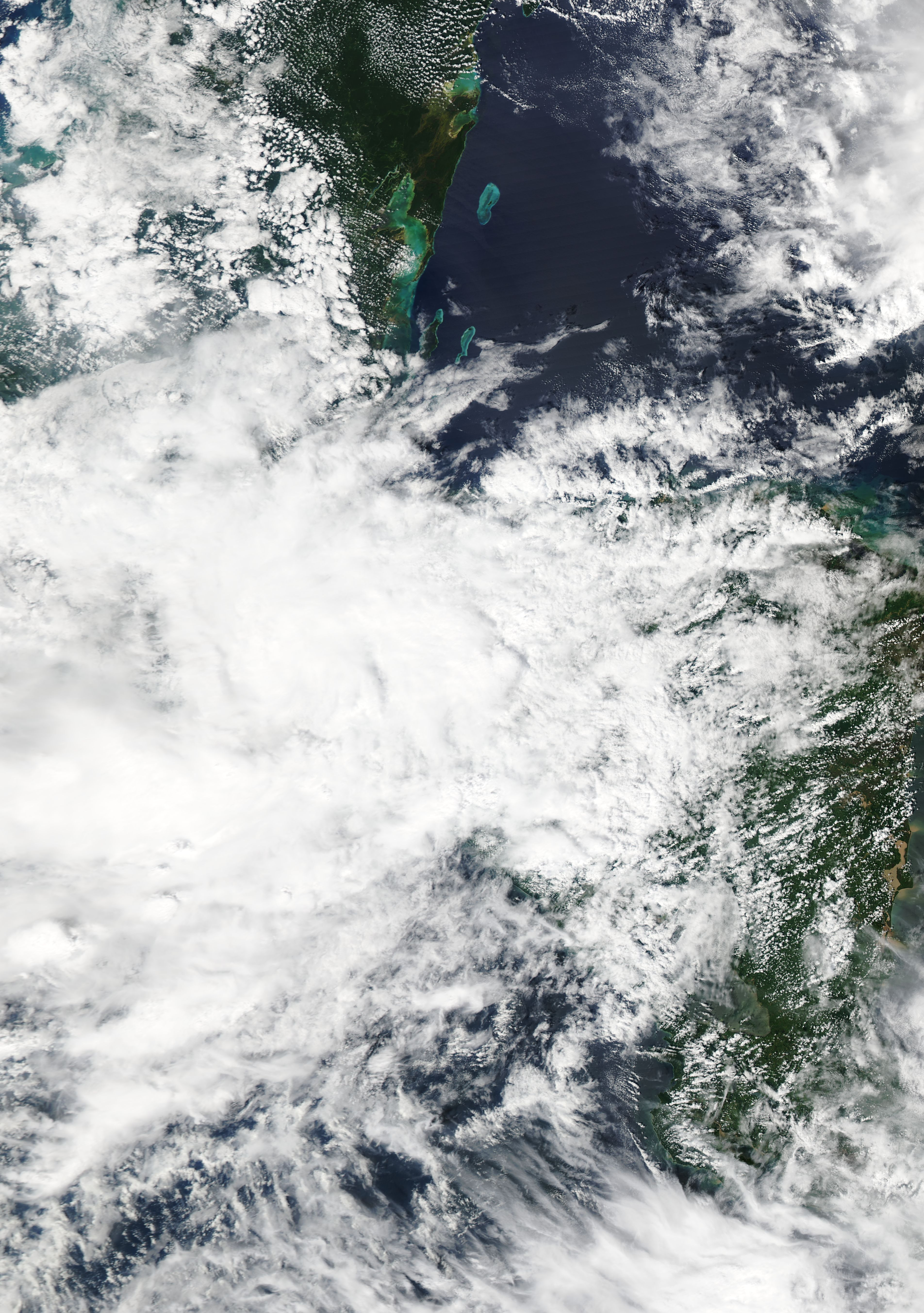
Tropical Depression Selma weakening over El Salvador on October 28

Upon the NHC classifying Selma as a tropical storm, the Government of El Salvador issued a tropical storm warning for the entire coast of El Salvador. At 16:00 UTC the same day, the Government of Guatemala issued a tropical storm watch for the Pacific coast of Guatemala.

Heavy rainfall caused by Selma and a cold front resulted in flooding and numerous mudslides in El Salvador, although damages were relatively minor. In Honduras, heavy rainfall caused flooding and landslides that affected some 38,000 people and 3,500 homes, as well as causing the banks of 13 rivers to overflow. According to figures from the Permanent Commission of Contingencies of Honduras (Copeco), 37,552 people were evacuated due to the heavy rains, and 3,200 people were placed in shelters due to life-threatening flooding caused by the storm. In the aftermath following the storm, the civil protection agency of Honduras distributed over 24,000 kilograms of food to residents affected by the flooding caused by the storm. In Nicaragua, 10 deaths were linked to flooding caused by heavy rainfall from Selma. 42 homes were damaged by floodwaters after the Tuma and the Río Grande de Matagalpa rivers rose above flood stage in the Chinandega Department, where 102 families and nearly 1,000 people were evacuated.

In the weeks following the storm, hundreds of sea turtle carcasses were found in Jiquilisco Bay. Biologists from the University of El Salvador determined that the cause of death of these turtles was consumption of toxic microalgae in a red tide algae bloom.

== See also ==
- Weather of 2017
- Tropical cyclones in 2017
- List of Eastern Pacific tropical storms
- Other tropical cyclones named Selma
- Tropical Storm Andres (1997) – made landfall in El Salvador as a tropical depression.
- Tropical Storm Alma (2008)
- Tropical Depression Twelve-E (2011) – also caused heavy rainfall in El Salvador.
- Hurricane Julia (2022) – also made landfall in El Salvador
