= Moisture advection =

Moisture advection is the horizontal transport of water vapor by the wind. Measurement and knowledge of atmospheric water vapor, or "moisture", is crucial in the prediction of all weather elements, especially clouds, fog, temperature, humidity thermal comfort indices and precipitation. Regions of moisture advection are often co-located with regions of warm advection.

== Definition ==
Using the classical definition of advection, moisture advection is defined as:

$$Adv(\rho_m)=-\mathbf{V}\cdot\nabla \rho_m \!$$

in which V is the horizontal wind vector, and $\rho_m$ is the density of water vapor. However, water vapor content is usually measured in terms of mixing ratio (mass fraction) in reanalyses or dew point (temperature to partial vapor pressure saturation, i.e. relative humidity to 100%) in operational forecasting. The advection of dew point itself can be thought as moisture advection:

$$Adv(T_d)=-\mathbf{V}\cdot\nabla T_d \!$$

== Moisture flux ==
In terms of mixing ratio, horizontal transport/advection can be represented in terms of moisture flux:

$$\mathbf{f}=q\mathbf{V}\!$$

in which q is the mixing ratio. The value can be integrated throughout the atmosphere to total transport of moisture through the vertical:

$$\mathbf{F}=\int_0^\infty \! \rho \mathbf{f}\,dz \,=-\int_P^0 \! \frac{\mathbf{f}}{g}\,dp \,$$

where $\rho$ is the density of air, and P is pressure at the ground surface. For the far right definition, we have used Hydrostatic equilibrium approximation.

And its divergence (convergence) imply net evapotranspiration (precipitation) as adding (removing) moisture from the column:

$$P-E-\frac{\partial (\int_0^\infty \! \rho q\,dz \,)}{\partial t}=-\nabla \cdot \mathbf{F}\!$$

where P, E, and the integral term are—precipitation, evapotranspiration, and time rate of change of precipitable water, all represented in terms of mass/(unit area * unit time). One can convert to more typical units in length such as mm by multiplying the density of liquid water and the correct length unit conversion factor.

== See also ==
- Haar (fog)
- Water cycle
- Positive vorticity advection
