= Hurricane Rafael =

Category 3 Atlantic hurricane in 2024

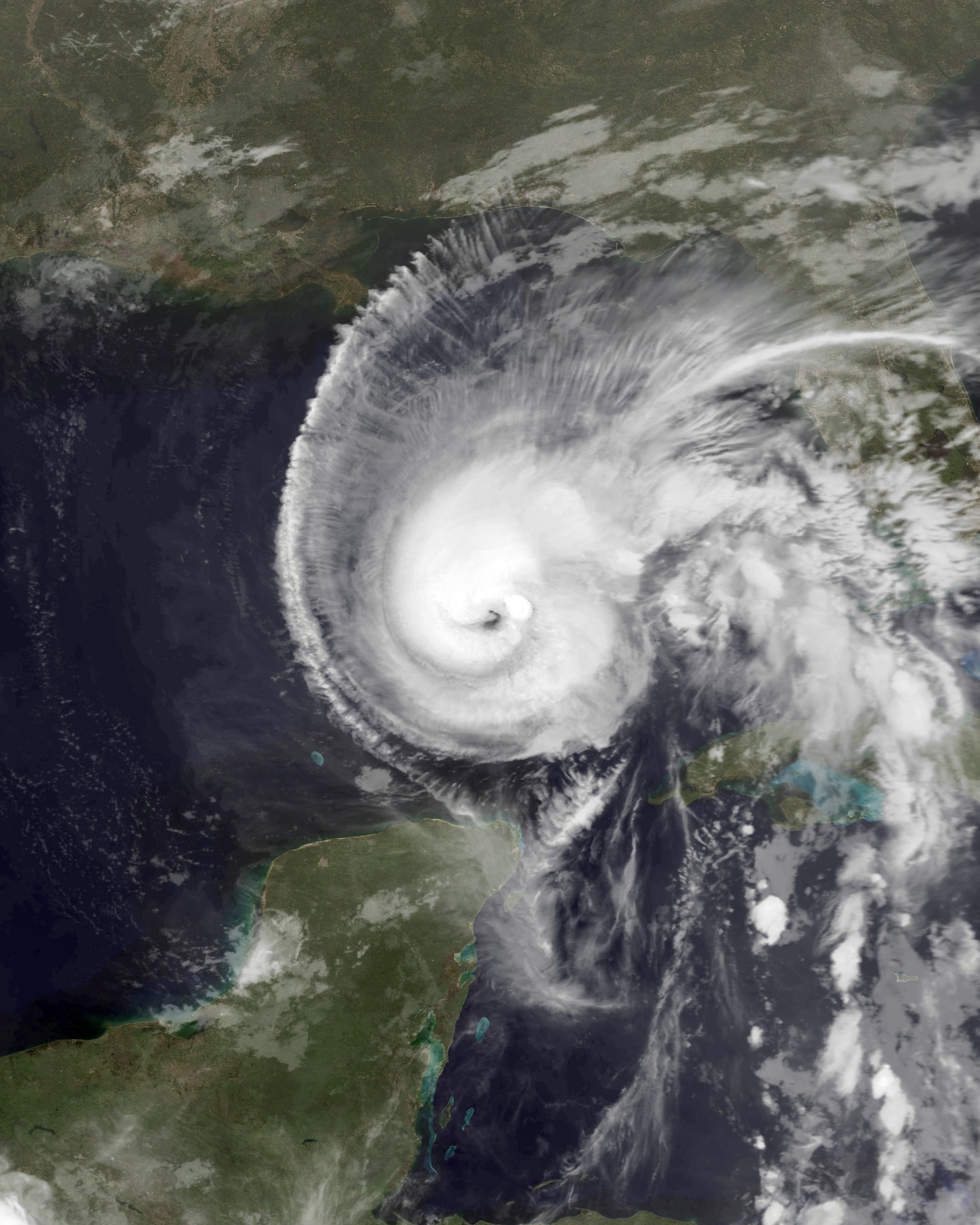
- Rafael in the Gulf of Mexico near peak intensity early on November 8

Meteorological history
- Formed: November 4, 2024
- Remnant low: November 10, 2024
- Dissipated: November 13, 2024

Category 3 major hurricane
- 1-minute sustained (SSHWS/NWS)
- Highest winds: 120 mph (195 km/h)
- Lowest pressure: 954 mbar (hPa); 28.17 inHg

Overall effects
- Fatalities: 8
- Damage: ≥$1.35 billion (2024 USD)
- Areas affected: Panama; Costa Rica; Colombia; Jamaica; Cayman Islands; Cuba; Florida Keys; United States Gulf Coast
- Part of the 2024 Atlantic hurricane season

Hurricane Rafael was the strongest November tropical cyclone in the Gulf of Mexico on record, tied with 1985's Hurricane Kate. The seventeenth named storm, eleventh hurricane, and fifth major hurricane of the annual season, Rafael formed on November 4 from an area of low-pressure spawned by a Central American gyre. Steady organization occurred throughout the next two days, with Rafael becoming a hurricane early on November 6, as it moved northwest towards Cuba. Favorable conditions enabled the cyclone to rapidly intensify, becoming a Category 3 major hurricane later that day before landfall in Cuba. Then, after weakening some while over land, it entered the Gulf of Mexico and re-intensified to a major hurricane once again at peak intensity early on November 8. Hostile conditions, including wind shear and cooler sea-surface temperatures, caused the hurricane to rapidly weaken afterward, falling below hurricane intensity later that day, and eventually degenerating into a remnant low on November 10. The circulation opened up into a trough the next day.

In its formative stages, Rafael produced heavy rainfall across several areas of Central America and Colombia. Numerous residents in Panama had to evacuate their homes after their houses were damaged, leaving a total of more than 210 displaced. Five people died as a result of the flooding in that country; one death was also reported in Colombia. There were two direct storm fatalities in Jamaica. Damage estimates in Panama were placed around US$110 million. Agricultural losses in Costa Rica totaled to at least ₡500 million (US$985,000). In Colombia, over 192,000 people were affected by the flooding. Aon estimated that the cyclone caused losses of at least US$150 million in Colombia. In Cuba, more than 283,000 people evacuated ahead of the storm, including 98,300 from Havana. Rafael's winds caused an island-wide power-grid failure. In western Cuba, 12 in (30 cm) of rain was reported, resulting in flooding and landslides. Government officials reported that areas in and around Artemisa sustained the worst damage from Rafael, with more than 3,000 homes damaged in Mayabeque and Artemisa provinces. In total, eight fatalities and at least $1.35 billion in damage can be attributed to Rafael, with approximately $1.08 billion in damage in Cuba alone.

== Meteorological history ==
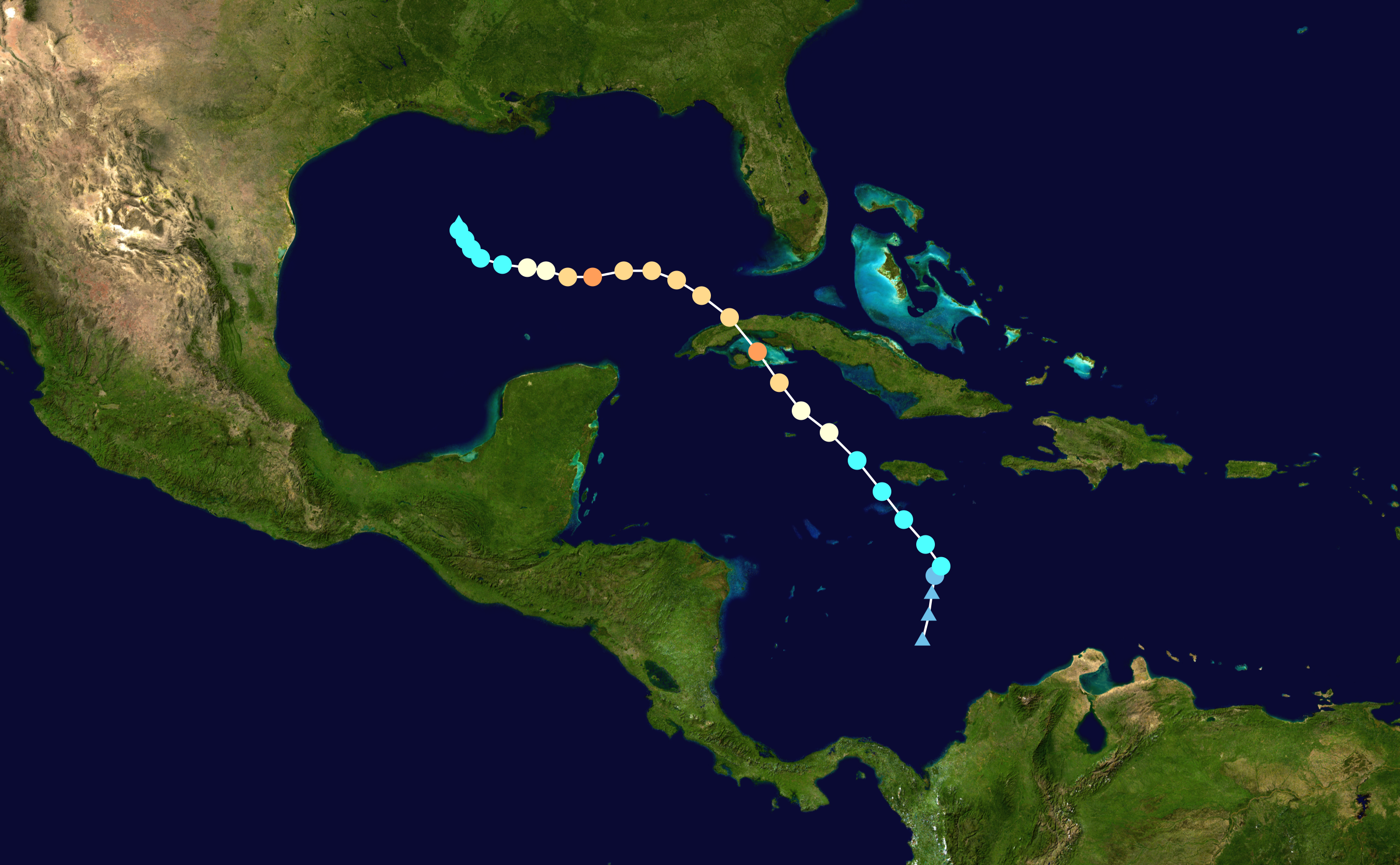
Map plotting the storm's track and intensity, according to the Saffir–Simpson scale Map key Saffir–Simpson scale Tropical depression (≤38 mph, ≤62 km/h) Tropical storm (39–73 mph, 63–118 km/h) Category 1 (74–95 mph, 119–153 km/h) Category 2 (96–110 mph, 154–177 km/h) Category 3 (111–129 mph, 178–208 km/h) Category 4 (130–156 mph, 209–251 km/h) Category 5 (≥157 mph, ≥252 km/h) Unknown Storm type Tropical cyclone Subtropical cyclone Extratropical cyclone, remnant low, tropical disturbance, or monsoon depression

On October 26, the National Hurricane Center (NHC) began monitoring the southwestern Caribbean in anticipation of tropical development. Several days later, on November 1, a broad area of low pressure developed over the southwestern Caribbean, associated with a Central American gyre. Early on November 3, the broad circulation contracted, with disorganized convection. That afternoon, Air Force Hurricane Hunters collected data showing that the system had developed a closed center but that deep convection had not yet become organized enough for it to be declared a tropical depression. Due to the disturbance's impending threat to Jamaica and the Cayman Islands, the NHC designated the developing storm Potential Tropical Cyclone Eighteen. Thunderstorms clustered near the mid-level center early on November 4, enabling more surface airflow, and an Air Force Reserve reconnaissance aircraft verified the birth of Tropical Depression Eighteen later that day, about 205 mi (335 km) southwest of Kingston, Jamaica. The depression became Tropical Storm Rafael six hours later and moved northwestward, driven by a high-pressure area in the western Atlantic and Florida.

Steady deepening occurred late that day, and early on November 5 as the large tropical cyclone gradually shrank while passing southwest of Jamaica. Quick strengthening began later that day after the storm formed a small wind core while traversing the very warm, deep waters of the northwestern Caribbean within weak wind shear. Rafael became a hurricane by 00:00 UTC on November 6 just south of Little Cayman, passing west of that island. It continued to swiftly intensify, with an eye forming, and became a Category 3 major hurricane with 115 mph (185 km/h) winds that evening while it neared western Cuba. At 21:15 UTC, Rafael moved ashore Artemisa province just east of Playa Majana. Rafael weakened slightly due to contact with western Cuba, entering the southeastern Gulf of Mexico as a Category 2 hurricane just before 00:00 UTC on November 7. Early on November 8, satellite images showed an eye had reemerged, and Rafael peaked with winds of 120 mph (195 km/h) that day while located a few hundred miles above the northernmost Yucatán Peninsula.

Later that afternoon, however, the system turned westward and began losing strength and organization due to increasing westerly wind shear and dry air intrusion. This trend continued, and Rafael was downgraded to a tropical storm late that same day. The storm slowed as it rounded the western end of the ridge, curving northwestward and northward on November 9. Wind shear increased that day, exposing a low-level center and displacing storms far to its northeast. Rafael continued weakening, and by 12:00 UTC on November 10, it lacked enough organized convection to be classed a tropical cyclone. It degenerated into a remnant low while drifting over the central Gulf. The remnants of Rafael decayed into a low-pressure trough by 18:00 UTC.

== Preparations ==
=== Panama ===
On November 2, the Government of Panama issued a red warning from Chiriquí to Veraguas. Panama's emergency services agency asked residents and tourists to pay attention to weather warnings issued by authorities and noted the threat of heavy rain and strong waves. Several yellow alerts, signifying the threat of the impending weather, were issued for the western portion of the nation. Colón, Coclé, and Kuna Yala had red warnings declared for them. Classes were suspended in five provinces, while the government opened nine emergency shelters.

=== Jamaica ===
Once the precursor to Rafael was designated as a potential tropical cyclone, a tropical storm warning was issued for Jamaica. Two matches in the Jamaica Premier League, originally scheduled for November 4, were postponed. Additionally, several matches in the Manning Cup had to be delayed due to the storm. The University of the West Indies closed all clinics and non-emergency services due to the storm.

=== Cayman Islands ===
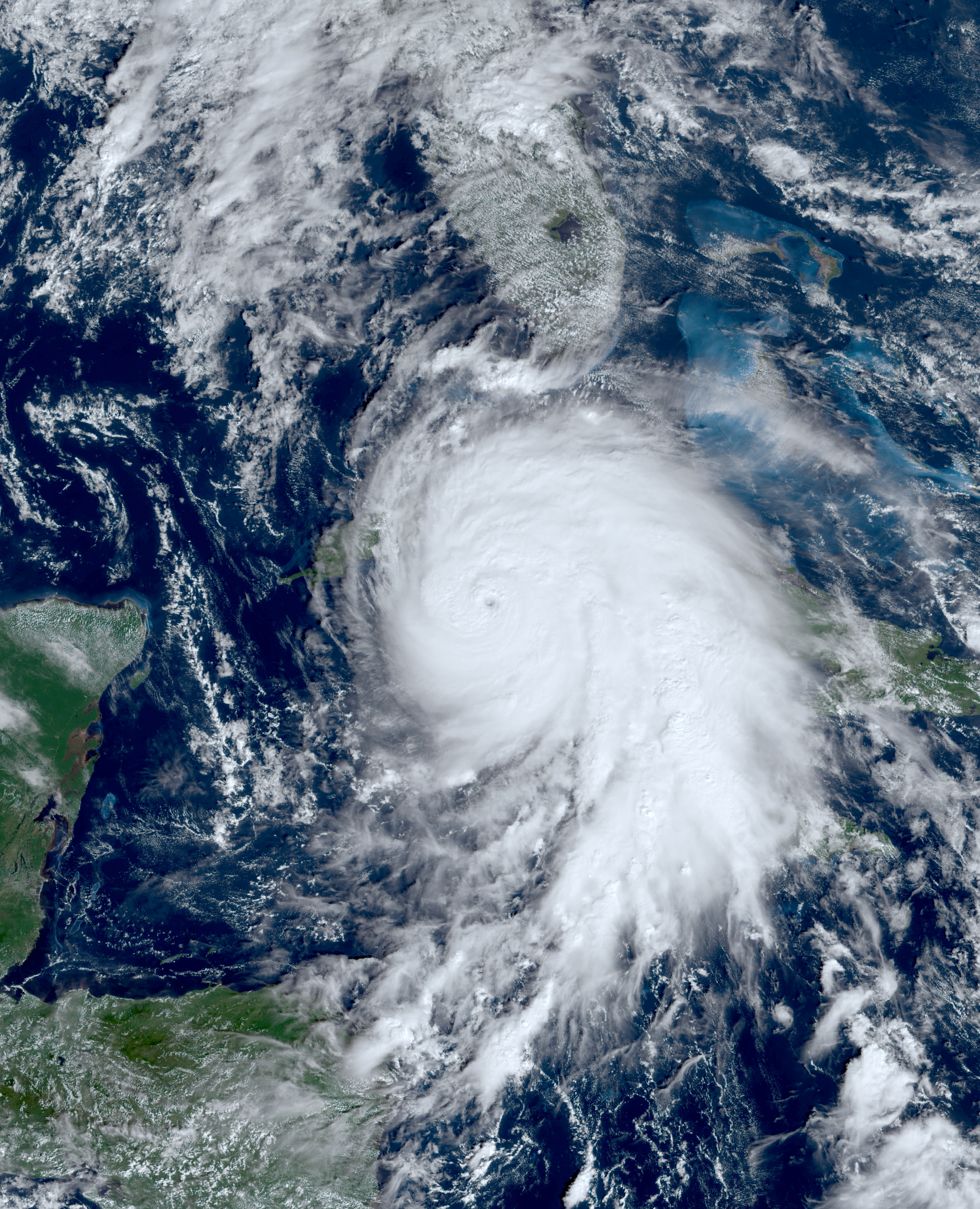
Rafael at its initial peak intensity approaching Cuba on November 6

At the time Rafael's precursor was designated as a potential tropical cyclone on November 3, a Hurricane Watch was issued for the Cayman Islands. The following morning, the watch covering the Cayman Islands was replaced with a Hurricane Warning. Due to the storm, all government schools and the University College of the Cayman Islands were closed on November 5. Cayman Airways confirmed that their fleet had been secured. The Cayman Islands Regiment deployed to Cayman Brac and Little Cayman for the first time. Eight were sent to Little Cayman, and ten were sent to Cayman Brac. Sandbags were made available for the residents of Cayman Brac and Grand Cayman. Shelters were also opened in Cayman Brac and Little Cayman. Several government offices closed in preparation for Rafael. The Cayman Islands' Bankers Association closed all banks on November 5.

=== Cuba ===
A hurricane watch went into effect for six eastern provinces of Cuba on November 4. The provinces of Camagüey and Las Tunas saw a tropical storm warning go into effect. Due to the system's expected impacts, over 66,000 people were evacuated from Guantánamo province. Additionally, several flights were cancelled, and maritime traffic between Batabanó and Nueva Gerona was suspended. Classes were suspended in multiple provinces with transportation services halted in multiple towns in Western Cuba, including the capital city Havana. Rafael approached as the country was still recovering from a country-wide power blackout and the effects of Hurricane Oscar, which struck the eastern part of Cuba about two weeks earlier. More than 283,000 people evacuated ahead of the storm, including 98,300 from Havana.

=== United States ===
Rip current warnings were issued for much of the Gulf Coast of the United States.

==== Florida ====
A tropical storm watch was posted on November 4 for the Florida Keys from the Dry Tortugas to the west of the Channel 5 Bridge, including Key West. On November 5, the watch was upgraded to a tropical storm warning. As a precaution, schools in Monroe County were closed on November 6.

== Impact ==
Casualties and damage by country
Country	Deaths	Damage (USD)
Panama	5	$110 million
Costa Rica	0	$980,000
Colombia	1	$150 million
Jamaica	2	$8 million
Cayman Islands	0	Minimal
Cuba	0	$1.08 billion
Total	8	>$1.35 billion

=== Panama and Costa Rica ===
In Panama, rains from the incipient disturbance of Rafael damaged several homes, leaving a total of more than 1,097 displaced. About 100 people were housed in shelters. At least five people died in the nation as a result, with another two remaining missing. More than 200 families were affected by the rains in Herrera and Los Santos Provinces. Damages in Panama were at least $110 million.

Additionally, interaction between the disturbance and the Pacific Intertropical Convergence Zone caused flooding in Costa Rica. This resulted in a bridge collapse and 42 people needing to be rescued in Guanacaste Province. Agricultural losses in Costa Rica were at least ₡500 million (US$980,000).

=== Colombia ===
In Colombia, Rafael's precursor caused torrential rainfall in the Santa Marta area. Rockslides occurred and several cars were swept away by floodwaters. Some homes also sustained damage, with two of them destroyed. One person also suffered from minor injuries. Multiple structures were declared at risk of collapse. In La Guajira Department, one person drowned, 192,465 people and 38,493 families were affected, with multiple streams overflowing resulting in numerous roads and houses being flooded. 700 billion pesos (US$159 million) were requested to assist those who were affected by the storm. As of January 2025, damages in Colombia are estimated to be at US$150 million, according to AON.

=== Jamaica ===
November 7, ERCC overview map showing the impact of Hurricane Rafael in Cuba and Jamaica

Officials in Jamaica blamed persistent rains ahead of the potential storm for a large landslide on November 3, which left several rural communities isolated. Heavy rains from Rafael caused several road blockages, with garbage propelled by the storm blocking a road in Saint Andrew Parish and a landslide blocking another road in Saint Catherine Parish. At the latter parish, two people were found dead in a vehicle that was swept away by the floods. Several of Jamaica's southern parishes received over 3 in (76 mm) of rainfall. Rainfall from Rafael exacerbated flooding in Troja district, causing several fords to break away throughout the area. The storm caused flooding and landslides and knocked the nation's power grid offline. According to the Jamaican government, damage in infrastructure and agriculture totaled at J$1.27 billion (US$8 million).

=== Cayman Islands ===
Cayman Brac had numerous trees and power lines downed; some structures and docks were also damaged. Rainfall peaked at 280 mm (11 in) in Cayman Brac and 33 mm (1.3 in) in Grand Cayman. Winds gusted up to 29 mph (46 km/h) in Grand Cayman. Torrential rainfall from Rafael caused the islands of Little Cayman and Cayman Brac to lose power. Grand Cayman saw rough seas and flooding from Rafael. Power lines and trees were downed on Little Cayman, with roads covered with sand and debris. Additionally, multiple dive boats sank off the coast of Little Cayman. However, losses were below the required amount to issue a payout to the islands.

=== Cuba ===
Costliest Cuban hurricanes
Rank	Hurricane	Season	Damage	Refs.
1	Irma	2017	$13.2 billion	
2	Ike	2008	$7.3 billion	
3	Matthew	2016	$2.58 billion	
4	Gustav	2008	$2.1 billion	
5	Michelle	2001	$2 billion	
5	Sandy	2012	$2 billion	
7	Dennis	2005	$1.5 billion	
8	Ivan	2004	$1.2 billion	
9	Rafael	2024	$1.08 billion	
10	Charley	2004	$923 million	

Rafael's strong winds caused an island-wide power-grid failure. In western Cuba, 100–200 mm (3.9–7.9 in) of rain was reported, with a peak rainfall total of 218 mm (8.6 in) in Bauta resulting in flooding and landslides. Government officials reported that areas in and around Artemisa sustained the worst damage from Rafael. In Artemisa, 2,825 homes were damaged, in addition to hospitals, schools, and service centers. Nearly 40,000 acres of crops were either damaged or lost. In neighboring Mayabeque, 441 homes were damaged, and agriculture was badly affected. Rafael passed about 30 mi (48 km) west of Havana, with sustained winds of 44 mph (71 km/h) being recorded, along with gusts of up to 71 mph (114 km/h). Rainfall from the hurricane flooded several neighborhoods in Centro Habana and Old Havana. Numerous homes and public buildings were damaged, trees were uprooted, and telephone poles toppled. Damages caused by Rafael were calculated at 25.8 billion pesos (US$1.08 billion).

=== United States ===
While Rafael did not approach the U.S. Gulf Coast, it did churn up rip currents along much of the coast on November 9 and 10. In addition, Rafael impacted the Florida Keys with over 2 in (51 mm) of rain at some locations, and winds gusted up to 53 mph (85 km/h). Some tree limbs were downed and some minor power outages occurred. Street flooding caused a few road closures. However, no significant damage was reported.

In Louisiana and Texas, a frontal boundary interacted with the weakening Rafael, pulling moisture into both states. Heavy rainfall was reported, causing flooding along numerous highways and homes. Rising floodwaters stalled several vehicles, prompting rescues. Total damage in Louisiana totaled to US$165,000. Total damage in Texas totaled to US$75,000. The same frontal boundary also caused flooding in Georgia and South Carolina, with 12 in (300 mm) of rain falling in less than 24 hours. In South Carolina, two people were killed as a result of freshwater flooding. Even so, these fatality and damage figures do not count towards the hurricane's official totals.

== See also ==
- Weather of 2024
- Tropical cyclones in 2024
- Timeline of the 2024 Atlantic hurricane season
- List of Category 3 Atlantic hurricanes
- List of Cuba hurricanes
- List of costliest Atlantic hurricanes
- Hurricane Jeanne (1980) – peaked at Category 2 strength in the Gulf, also in November, and dissipated without making landfall
- Hurricane Michelle (2001) – last November major hurricane to make landfall in Cuba prior to Rafael
