= Hurricane Jeanne (1980) =

Category 2 Atlantic hurricane in 1980

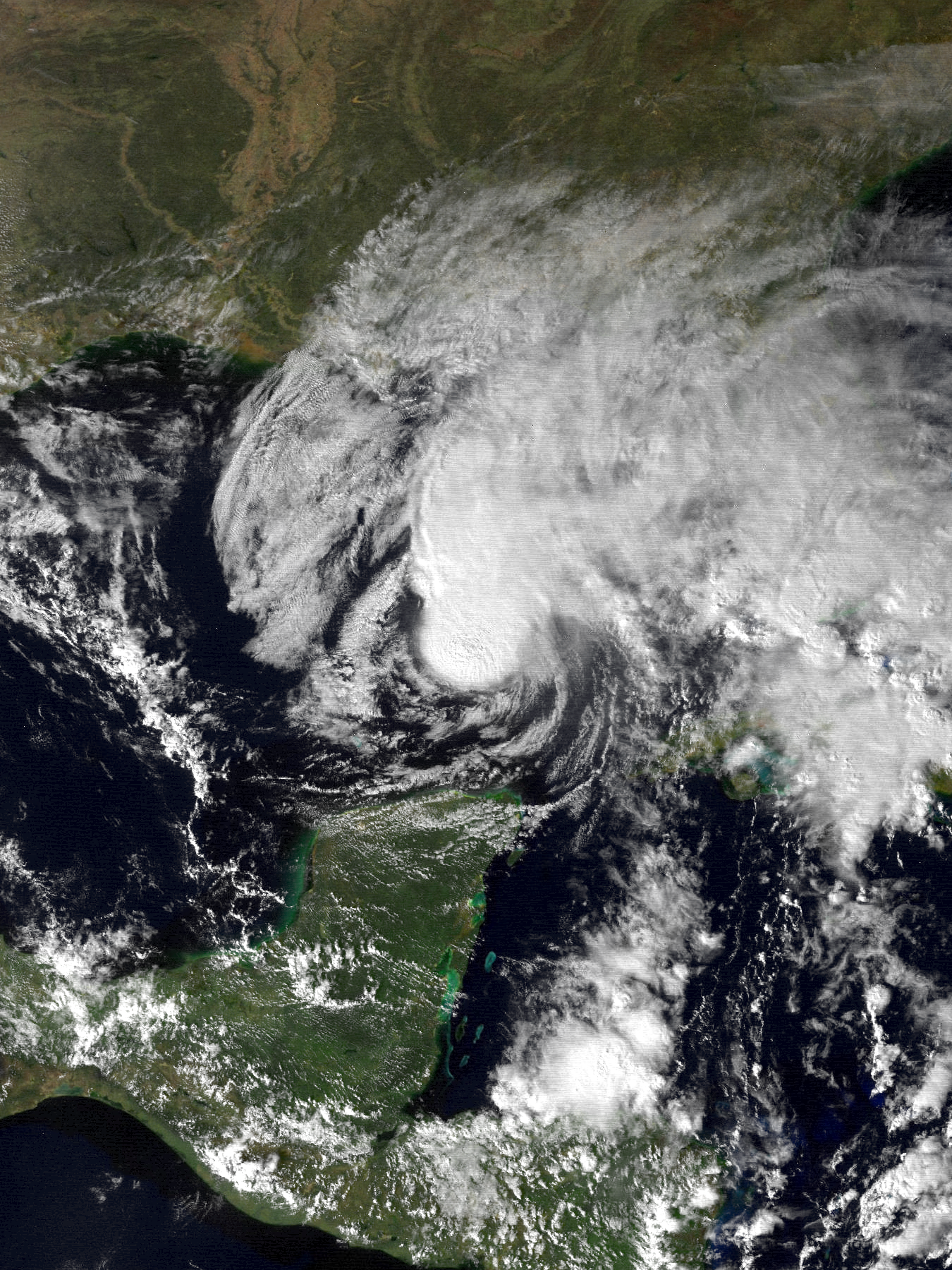
- Hurricane Jeanne at peak intensity in the Gulf of Mexico on November 11

Meteorological history
- Formed: November 7, 1980
- Dissipated: November 16, 1980

Category 2 hurricane
- 1-minute sustained (SSHWS/NWS)
- Highest winds: 100 mph (155 km/h)
- Lowest pressure: 986 mbar (hPa); 29.12 inHg

Overall effects
- Fatalities: None direct (+1 indirect)
- Damage: ≥$1 million (1980 USD)
- Areas affected: Western Cuba; Gulf of Mexico; South Florida; Texas
- IBTrACS
- Part of the 1980 Atlantic hurricane season

Hurricane Jeanne was a moderate hurricane that reached its peak and dissipated in the Gulf of Mexico without making landfall. The thirteenth tropical cyclone, tenth named storm, and eighth hurricane of the 1980 Atlantic hurricane season, Jeanne developed over the southern Caribbean on November 7. It moved swiftly northward, and intensified to a tropical storm on November 9, entering the southern Gulf of Mexico a day later. Jeanne turned westward on November 11, and rapidly intensified to its peak intensity of 100 mph (155 km/h). It weakened on November 12, and its forward motion slowed; weakening because of dry air intrusion, the cyclone, while a tropical storm, executed a clockwise loop on November 15. It dissipated on November 16.

At the time, Jeanne was one of three November hurricanes in the Gulf of Mexico; it was the first tropical cyclone to attain hurricane strength in the Gulf of Mexico during November. Jeanne was also the second-strongest Gulf hurricane to never hit land. The late-season storm startled maritime interests, and two barges broke free from towing vessels. Indirectly, the hurricane produced heavy precipitation that peaked at 23.28 in (591 mm) in Key West, causing severe flooding there and over nearby parts of the Florida Keys. Minor beach erosion occurred along the Texas coast, where tides were 2 to 4 ft (0.61 to 1.22 m) above normal; coastal flooding affected the state, which was heavily impacted by tropical cyclones in August and September. Jeanne caused no direct deaths.

== Meteorological history ==
Map plotting the storm's track and intensity, according to the Saffir–Simpson scale Map key Saffir–Simpson scale Tropical depression (≤38 mph, ≤62 km/h) Tropical storm (39–73 mph, 63–118 km/h) Category 1 (74–95 mph, 119–153 km/h) Category 2 (96–110 mph, 154–177 km/h) Category 3 (111–129 mph, 178–208 km/h) Category 4 (130–156 mph, 209–251 km/h) Category 5 (≥157 mph, ≥252 km/h) Unknown Storm type Tropical cyclone Subtropical cyclone Extratropical cyclone, remnant low, tropical disturbance, or monsoon depression

The precursor of Jeanne, a tropical wave, formed over West Africa on October 26, reaching the Caribbean in early November. Unsettled weather began over the northwestern Caribbean on November 4. At 18:00 UTC on November 7, a low-level trough formed about 60 miles (95 km) east-southeast of Puerto Cabezas, Nicaragua. Over three days it headed north-northwest, becoming a tropical depression on November 8, 200 miles (320 km) west of Grand Cayman. At the time, weather forecasters at the National Hurricane Center (NHC) doubted it would organize further; however, large-scale atmospheric features, such as extensive ridging over the Gulf of Mexico, were unusually conducive to hurricane formation so late in the year. (Note: Its location and date made the cyclone climatologically typical, however.) A deep low-pressure area off Newfoundland fixed these parameters, allowing the system to strengthen; at 12:00 UTC on November 9 the latter acquired winds of 45 mph (75 km/h)—equal to tropical-storm status—and the name Jeanne, making it the first November storm in the Atlantic Ocean since 1971's Laura. Within a day it crossed the Yucatán Channel at about the same intensity, during which reconnaissance aircraft sampled a pressure of 999 mb (29.5 inHg).

Sensing the ridge, Jeanne bent slowly west over the southern Gulf of Mexico. The storm drew upon warm sea surface temperatures, gaining force in turn. On November 11 it rapidly intensified, its winds rising from 65 mph (100 km/h) to 100 mph (155 km/h)—Category 2—in a day; the latter was its peak, making Jeanne the most recent November hurricane in the Atlantic since 1966's Lois. The USS Taney logged 109 mph (175 km/h), a speed atypical of the storm's pressure, (Note: The storm's lowest pressure was 986 mb (29.1 inHg), equal to Category 1, and suggested winds of at most 95 mph (155 km/h). Until the late 1980s the Saffir–Simpson scale ranked storms by central pressure. Moreover, the reading from the Taney was ascribed to intense squalls.) while other data sources implied lower winds. Jeanne's peak was brief, lasting six hours; nevertheless, the storm and a pressure gradient combined to produce gales 100–150 miles (160–240 km) away. Jeanne soon lost intensity, and steering currents ebbed, causing it to decelerate further; its 30-mile-wide (48 km) eye briefly halted 450 miles (725 km) south-southeast of New Orleans. Early on November 12 it reverted to Category 1 and by 00:00 UTC the next day lost hurricane winds altogether; however, it retained winds of 65–70 mph (100–110 km/h) for another day. During this timeframe Jeanne was the most northwesterly November storm to date in the Atlantic. (Note: In 1980 the Atlantic hurricane database, HURDAT, covered years no earlier than 1886; reanalysis extended the record back to 1851 in 2001.) Arcing northwest, Jeanne neared a col over the western Gulf of Mexico. The gradient slackened, enabling a drifting motion, and Jeanne came to a near-standstill 140 miles (225 km) east of Brownsville, Texas. The storm also ingested stable air, shedding its convection. For a time Jeanne continued to meander between a tardy trough and remnant ridging, but began backtracking east-northeast, ahead of and in response to a cold front. Early on November 15 it degenerated into a depression and began a clockwise loop, dying at sea a day later. Its remnants merged with the cold front.

== Preparations ==
On November 9, forecasters outlined a course across western Cuba, toward South Florida, and said Jeanne could reach low-end hurricane intensity. The NHC counseled mariners in the Yucatán Channel, as well as the southeastern Gulf of Mexico, to stay abreast of the storm and to seek sheltered locations. Officials remarked that the storm's evolution was highly uncertain, dubbing the tempest a "freak of nature". Forecasters later expected landfall on the Gulf Coast of the United States. On November 12 the NHC issued a gale warning for the area between the Mississippi River Delta and a point near Port O'Connor, Texas. Fearing high tides, the National Weather Service (NWS) advised 16 Louisiana parishes to ready themselves. Lafourche and Terrebonne parishes shut schools, wary of the storm's track. Several oil companies—Shell, Gulf Oil, Chevron, ODECO, and Texaco—withdrew equipment and all but essential personnel from offshore rigs. Some 4,000 workers left the platforms, and Grand Isle, Louisiana, directed residents to leave, as did South Padre Island, Texas, where fewer than 100 people departed. Padre Island National Seashore closed. Some residents on Dauphin Island, Alabama, voluntarily evacuated, recalling 1979's Hurricane Frederic and fleeing Jeanne's northward motion. The NHC urged that small watercraft remain in ports from Brownsville, Texas, to Tarpon Springs, Florida. Forecasters awaited tides of 2 to 4 ft (0.61 to 1.22 m) above normal in Louisiana and coastal Texas. Meteorologists foresaw impact in Southwest Louisiana, although Jeanne eventually stayed offshore; thousands of residents moved inland, while Civil Defense remained alert. Forecasters anticipated locally heavy rainfall, although they hinted it would remain below 8 in (200 mm).

== Impact, aftermath, recovery, and records ==
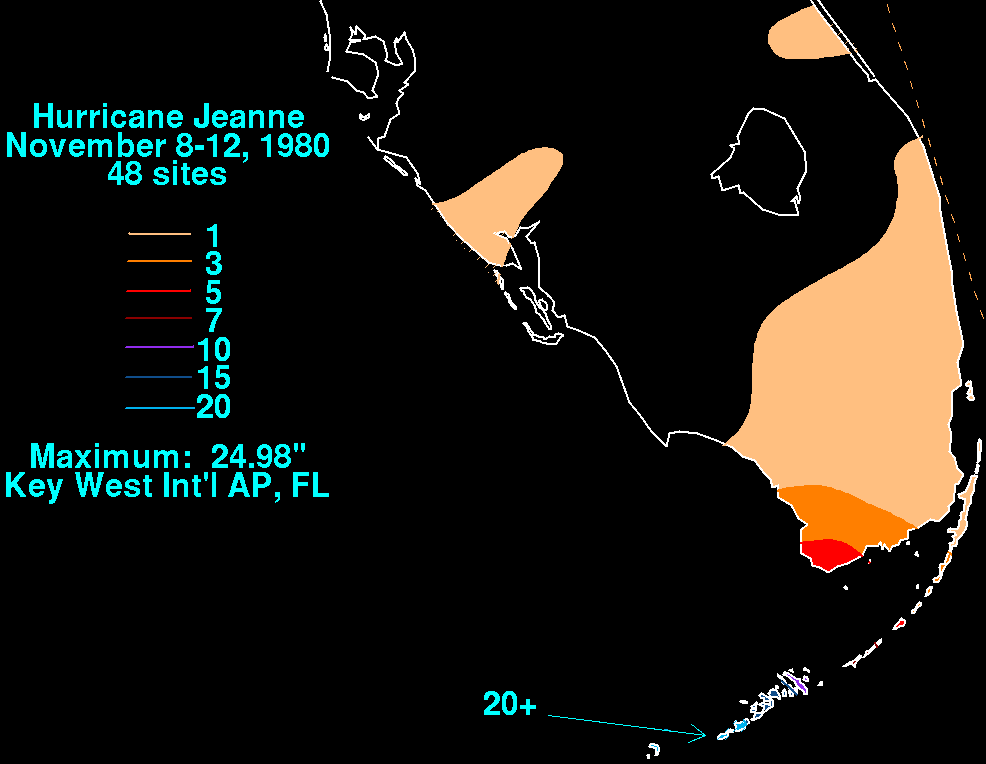
Rainfall summary for Hurricane Jeanne

Copious rainfall significantly impacted tobacco crops in Cuba's Pinar del Río Province, forcing evacuations there. Jeanne and a large high-pressure area joined forces to generate rough seas over the northern Gulf of Mexico; wave heights reached 15 ft (4.6 m). In Key West, the storm's outer fringes produced a record-breaking 24-hour rainfall total of 23.28 in (591 mm); 13.58 in (345 mm) fell within six hours. It remains the record 24-hour November rainfall total for the city as of 2018. The previous record—19.88 in (505 mm)—was set on November 13–14, 1954. The heavy precipitation was attributed to a mesoscale feature; inflow maximized along a convergent rainband that intersected with an adjacent stationary front, which also contributed to the deluge. Storms trained over the Florida Keys, dumping prolific rains. The rains closed all 14 schools in Monroe County, along with Key West International Airport and most businesses, including bars, in Key West itself; at the latter place, local authorities confined residents at home. Telephone and power services were partly disrupted, and water lay 5 ft (1.5 m) deep in streets, carrying off derelict automobiles. Denizens paddled down streets. Heavy rains overspread mainland southern Florida as well, with some areas amassing a third of their monthly mean in a day. A wooden salvage barge, 80 ft (24 m) long, sank in the storm 150 mi (240 km) offshore Key West, but its crew of three were unharmed. A fatal heart attack was indirectly storm-related. Storm damage at Key West could be seen three days after, and losses there totaled $1 million. (Note: Losses are in 1980 United States dollars unless otherwise noted.)

Jeanne produced a prolonged period of rough surf and heavy swells along the Texas coast. High tides caused beach erosion and flooding in Texas, especially near Galveston. The highest tides, 4 ft (1.2 m), crested at Port Aransas. Water lapped at the foot of the dunes on Mustang Island, and 3-to-5-foot (0.91 to 1.52 m) waves hit the beaches. As the storm stayed at sea, other effects in Texas were negligible. Elsewhere, several ships were caught off guard by the late arrival of Jeanne. Winds and seas snarled marine traffic in the Gulf of Mexico, severing a few barges from towing vessels. One of the barges, an oil rig tender, was carried several hundred miles across the central Gulf of Mexico. All 16 crew members survived, and there were no maritime deaths related to the hurricane. The storm also claimed a sunken helicopter, foiling a weeklong retrieval mission. Jeanne was the second-strongest Gulf hurricane on record to not strike the Gulf coast, behind 2024's Rafael. Additionally, it was one of just four tropical cyclones in the 20th century to become hurricanes in the Gulf of Mexico without hitting land; the others were Laurie of 1969, Henri of 1979, and Alberto of 1982. At the time, Jeanne was the first Gulf hurricane in November since a storm in 1925, but in 2011 reanalysis downgraded the latter.

== See also ==
- List of Texas hurricanes (1980–present)
- List of Category 2 Atlantic hurricanes
- Other storms of the same name
- Hurricane Rafael (2024) - took a similar path

== Sources ==
- Jarrell, Jerry P.; Herbert, Paul J.; Mayfield, Max (August 1992). Hurricane experience levels of coastal county populations, Texas to Maine (Technical report). NOAA Technical Memorandum. Coral Gables, Florida: National Weather Service. NWS NHC-46.
- Landsea, Christopher W.; Glenn, David A.; Bredemeyer, William; et al. (2007). "A Reanalysis of the 1911–20 Atlantic Hurricane Database" (PDF). Journal of Climate. 21 (10). American Meteorological Society: 2138–2168. Bibcode:2008JCli...21.2138L. doi:10.1175/2007JCLI1119.1. Archived (PDF) from the original on May 14, 2016 – via Atlantic Oceanographic and Meteorological Laboratory.
- Lawrence, Miles B.; Pelissier, Joseph M. (July 1, 1981). "Atlantic Hurricane Season of 1980". Monthly Weather Review. 109 (7): 1567–1582. Bibcode:1981MWRv..109.1567L. doi:10.1175/1520-0493(1981)109<1567:AHSO>2.0.CO;2.
