= Tropical Storm Julia (2016) =

Atlantic tropical storm in 2016

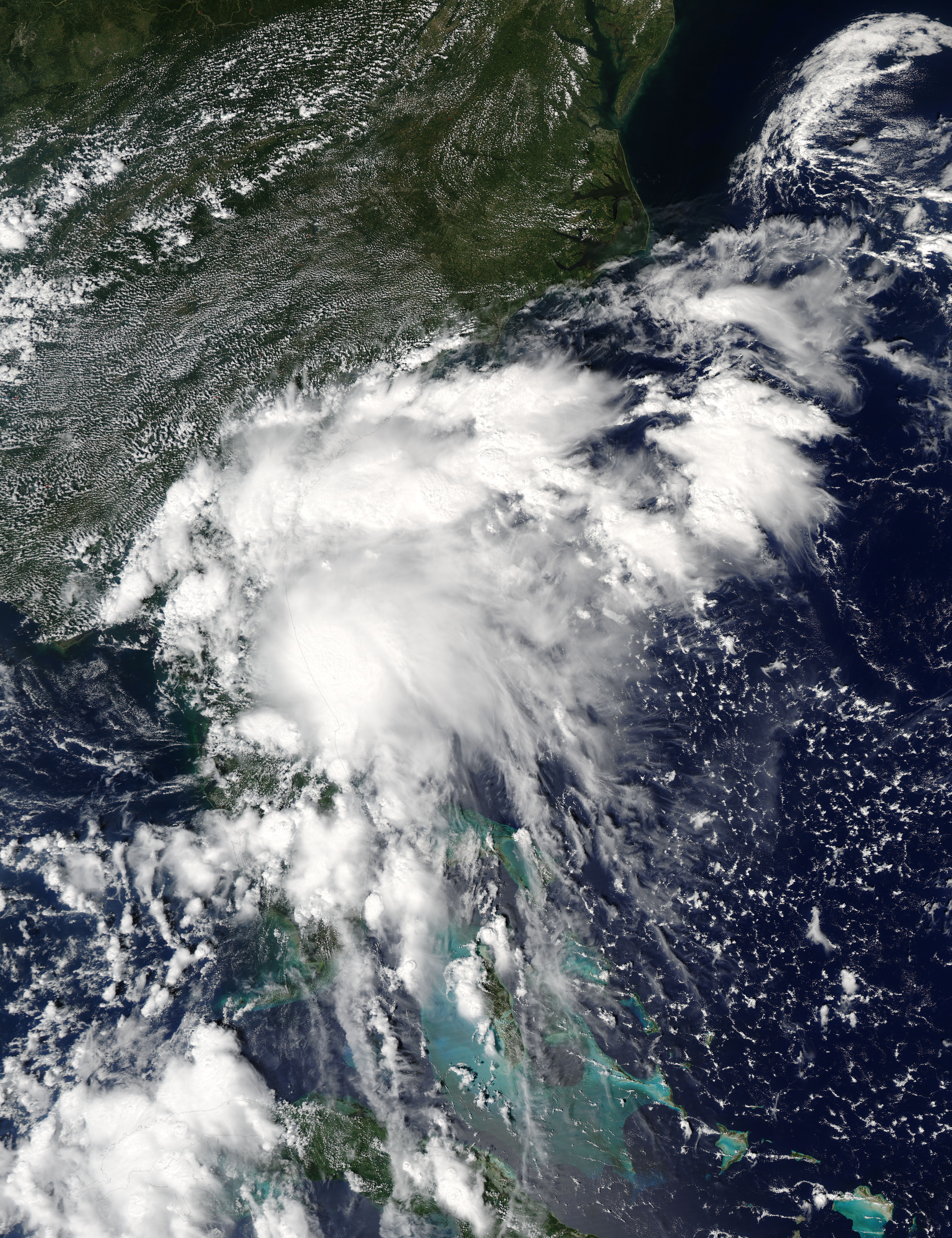
- Tropical Storm Julia at peak intensity over Florida on September 13

Meteorological history
- Formed: September 13, 2016
- Remnant low: September 18, 2016
- Dissipated: September 21, 2016

Tropical storm
- 1-minute sustained (SSHWS/NWS)
- Highest winds: 50 mph (85 km/h)
- Lowest pressure: 1007 mbar (hPa); 29.74 inHg

Overall effects
- Fatalities: None
- Damage: $6.13 million (2016 USD)
- Areas affected: The Bahamas, Southeastern United States
- IBTrACS
- Part of the 2016 Atlantic hurricane season

Tropical Storm Julia was a weak tropical cyclone that caused minor damage across the Eastern United States in September 2016. The tenth named storm of the 2016 Atlantic hurricane season, Julia developed from a tropical wave near the coast of east-central Florida on September 13. Initially a tropical depression, the system soon made landfall near Jensen Beach. Despite moving inland, the cyclone intensified into a tropical storm, shortly before strengthening further to reach maximum sustained winds of 50 mph (85 km/h). Julia then drifted north-northwestward and then northeastward, moving offshore the Southeastern United States on September 14. A cyclonic loop occurred as strong westerly air developed in the region, with the shear causing fluctuations in intensity. By September 19, Julia degenerated into a remnant low, which later transitioned into an extratropical cyclone and moved inland over North Carolina before dissipating on September 21.

Due to Julia's asymmetrical structure and fairly weak intensity, the storm caused generally minor wind and flooding damage in Florida, Georgia, and South Carolina. However, parts of North Carolina received as much as 12 in (300 mm) of rain, while as much as 18 in (460 mm) fell in the Hampton Roads area of Virginia. One million gallons of sewage from Elizabeth City flowed into the Pasquotank River and Charles Creek. The Cashie River in Windsor, reached 15 ft (4.6 m), 2 ft (0.6 m) above flood stage. Several businesses and approximately 60 homes in the town were destroyed. In Bertie County alone, a total of 72 people had to be rescued from their homes, while 61 others were evacuated from nursing homes. Schools were closed in Bertie, Currituck and Hertford counties for at least two days. In Virginia, flooding overwhelmed the sewer system in Chesapeake and inundated numerous roads in the southeastern portion of the state. Damage from the storm amounted to $6.13 million.

== Meteorological history ==
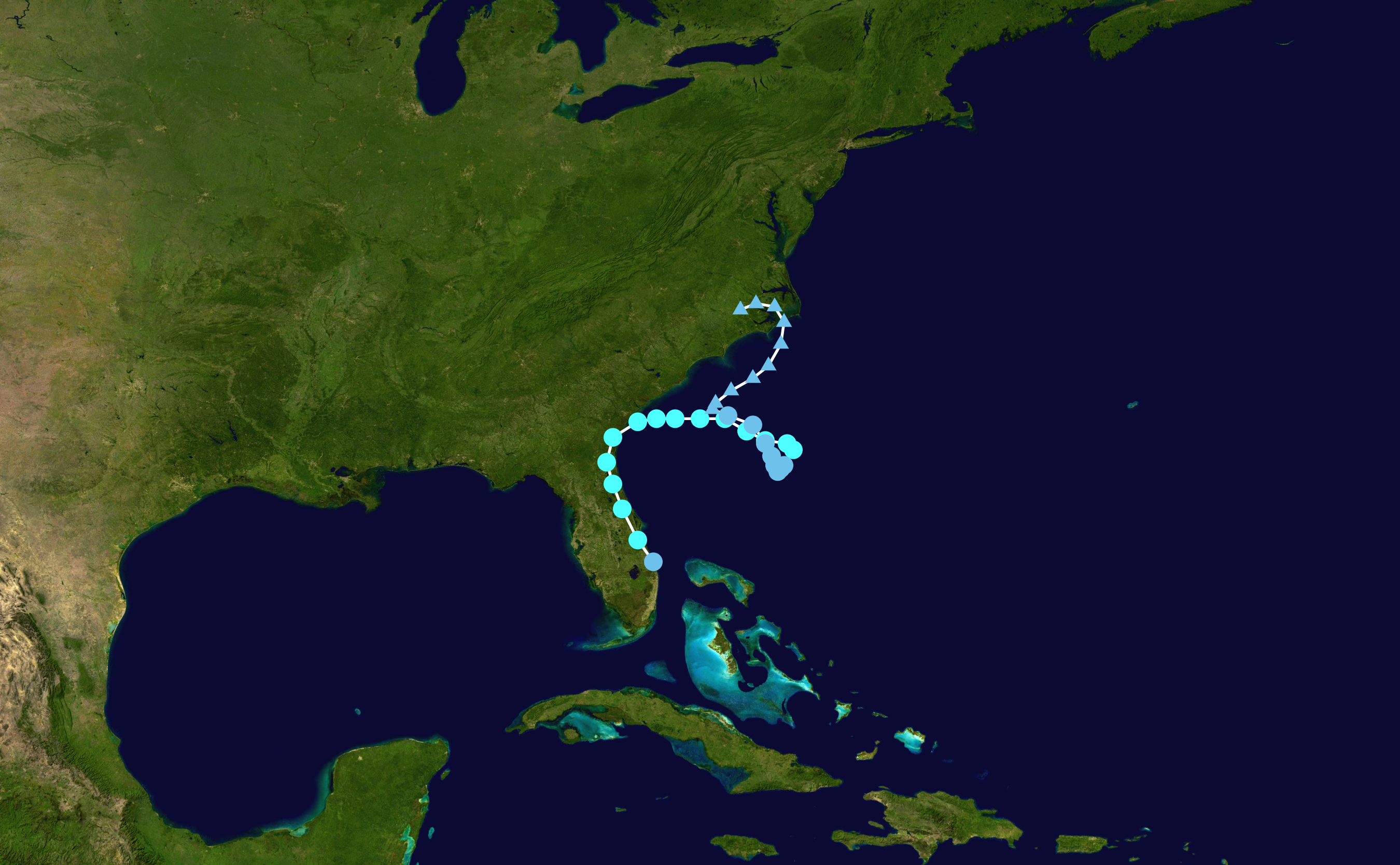
Map plotting the storm's track and intensity, according to the Saffir–Simpson scale Map key Saffir–Simpson scale Tropical depression (≤38 mph, ≤62 km/h) Tropical storm (39–73 mph, 63–118 km/h) Category 1 (74–95 mph, 119–153 km/h) Category 2 (96–110 mph, 154–177 km/h) Category 3 (111–129 mph, 178–208 km/h) Category 4 (130–156 mph, 209–251 km/h) Category 5 (≥157 mph, ≥252 km/h) Unknown Storm type Tropical cyclone Subtropical cyclone Extratropical cyclone, remnant low, tropical disturbance, or monsoon depression

A tropical wave emerged into the Atlantic Ocean from the west coast of Africa on September 1. Due to entrainment of dry air, the wave struggled to maintain convection as it progressed westwards. The National Hurricane Center (NHC) did not begin monitoring the system in its Tropical Weather Outlooks until a concentrated area of low pressure developed about 350 mi (560 km) east of the Leeward Islands on September 8. The convection quickly diminished and mainly consisted of only sporadically bursts of shower and thunderstorm activity. Little change in organization took place as the disturbance tracked through the Bahamas on September 11 and September 12. However, the disturbance quickly organized and developed more thunderstorm activity while approaching Florida. A tropical depression is estimated to have formed at 06:00 UTC on September 13, around the time it was making landfall in Jensen Beach, Florida. Within a few hours, a strong band of deep convection formed in the northeast quadrant of the cyclone, though westerly wind shear prevented any significant convection from developing on the western side of the storm.

Infrared satellite loop of Julia moving off the Georgia coast on September 14

Radar and surface observations indicate that the depression intensified into Tropical Storm Julia around 12:00 UTC on September 13, about six hours after forming, becoming the first tropical cyclone to intensify into a tropical storm while over land. Once designated as a tropical storm, Julia reached its peak intensity of 50 mph (85 km/h) while inland, At 03:00 UTC on September 14, the NHC initiated advisories on Julia – which was then centered near Jacksonville – and initially predicted that the storm would move north-northwestward and become extratropical or a remnant low pressure area over Georgia by September 16. Shortly thereafter, Julia weakened slightly due to moderate to high wind shear. Periodic bursts of convection occurred near the center of the system as it moved over water and paralleled the coast of Florida and Georgia. However, these bursts were short-lived due to strong wind shear, causing its elongated circulation to become far removed from the deep convection. Operationally, the NHC erroneously downgraded Julia to a tropical depression on September 15. At 00:00 UTC that day, Julia attained its minimum barometric pressure of 1007 mbar (29.7 inHg).

Julia consisted of mainly a low-level swirl of clouds by late on September 16; however, minimal convection kept the storm at the minimum requirements for a tropical cyclone. Early on September 17, Julia weakened to a tropical depression. Despite a slight increase in convection and organization, wind shear and dry air continued to take its toll on the increasingly ill-defined storm, and Julia degenerated into a remnant low by early on September 19 after being devoid of convection for nearly 12 hours. While moving north, the remnants of Julia then transitioned into a weak extratropical cyclone and made a small westward turn before dissipating inland over North Carolina on September 21.

== Preparations and impact ==
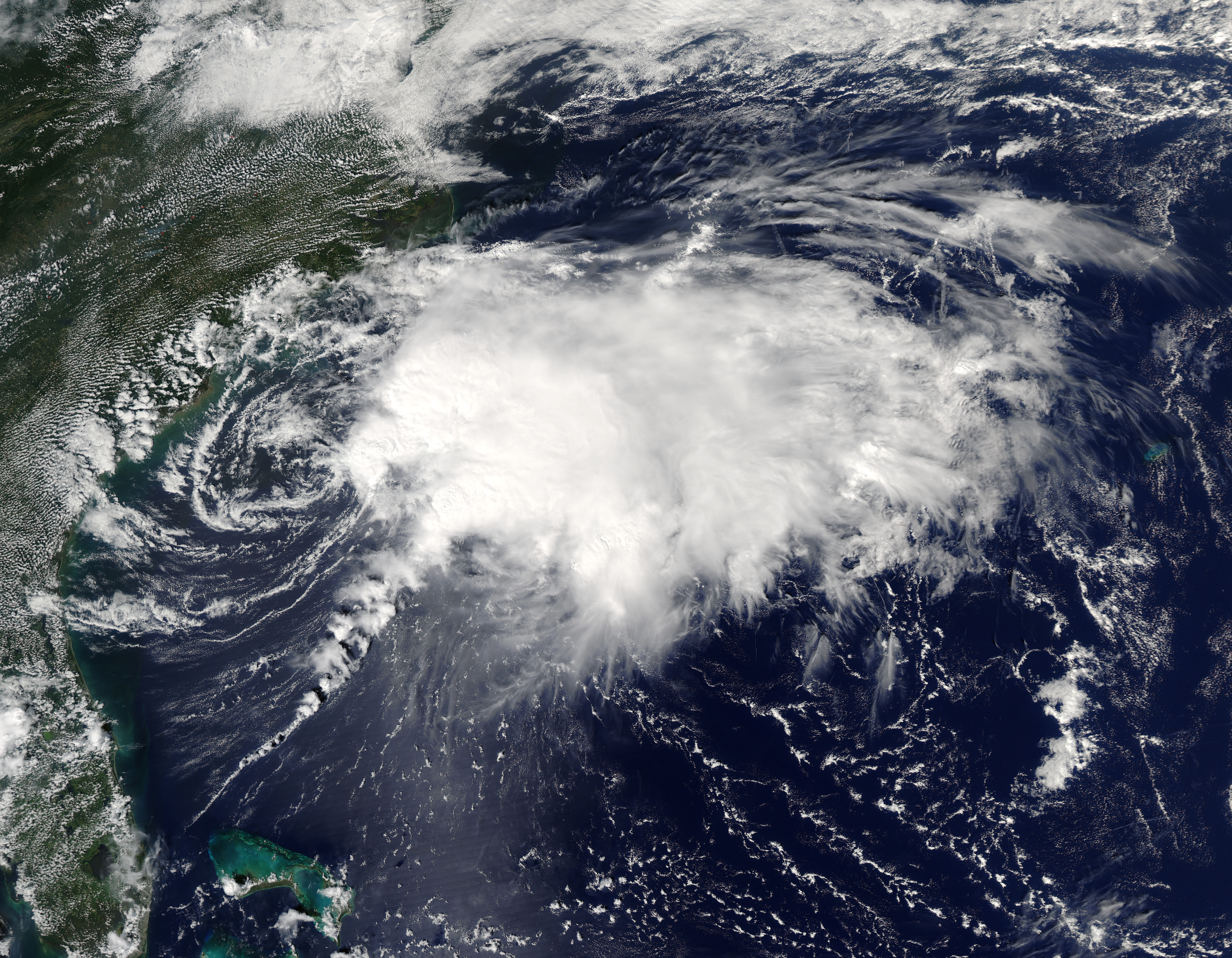
Tropical Storm Julia weakening off the Southeastern United States on September 15

Upon initiating advisories on the storm at 03:00 UTC on September 14, the NHC issued a tropical storm warning from Ponte Vedra Beach, Florida, to Altamaha Sound in Georgia. Nine hours later, the tropical storm warning was discontinued as the cyclone began moving offshore Georgia. Additionally, flash flood watches were issued between Florida and North Carolina, as up to 10 in (250 mm) of rainfall was possible in some areas. Florida governor Rick Scott urged residents to prepare in case an evacuation became necessary and to dump standing water to control mosquitoes that could be carrying the Zika virus. Jacksonville mayor Lenny Curry released a statement telling those in the path of the storm to stay off the roadways due to the rain and wind and potential flash flooding.

In Florida, the storm produced wind gusts of 30 to 48 mph (48 to 77 km/h) along the First Coast, causing some structural damage, including ripping apart the roof of a Chevron gas station in Neptune Beach and carrying it over two blocks before dropping it. While Julia was still in its precursor stages as it paralleled the coast of Florida, an EF0 tornado was reported and later confirmed in the areas of Barefoot Bay, with sustained winds as high as 85 mph (137 km/h). One home had its roof partially ripped off by the tornado as it tracked through the area. Flooding rain impacted the Space Coast and the First Coast, with 3.3 in (84 mm) of precipitation reported in Melbourne.

The storm knocked out power to over 1,300 people in Georgia, especially in and near the Sea Islands and St. Simons. In South Carolina, rainfall from Julia caused flash flooding in a number of locations, such as the Charleston metropolitan area, where flooding resulted in the closure of several roads. Accumulations peaked at 3.67 in (93 mm) on September 14. Sporadic power outages were also reported.

As the remnants of Julia interacted with a cold front near the coastline, parts of North Carolina received as much as 12 in (300 mm) of rain. One million gallons of sewage from Elizabeth City flowed into the Pasquotank River and Charles Creek. The Cashie River in Windsor, crested at 15 ft (4.6 m) on September 22, about 2 ft (0.61 m) above major flood stage. In Windsor, several businesses and approximately 60 homes suffered water damage. In Bertie County alone, 72 people had to be rescued from their homes and vehicles, while 61 others were evacuated from nursing homes. A shelter was opened for displaced residents. Damage in the county reached about $5 million in damage, including $4 million to property and $1 million to agriculture. Flooding in Bertie, Currituck, and Hertford counties resulted in school closures for at least two days. On September 22, then-Governor Pat McCrory declared a state of emergency for Bertie, Camden, Chowan, Currituck, Dare, Gates, Halifax, Hertford, Northampton, Pasquotank, and Perquimans. A disaster declaration was approved following Hurricane Matthew in October, which also included aid for victims of flooding during Julia. The declaration allowed businesses and non-profit organizations in Bertie, Chowan, Halifax, Hertford, Martin, Northampton, and Washington counties to apply for low-interest loans via the Small Business Administration, while loans up to $200,000 became available for needy homeowners.

Heavy rainfall was reported in southeastern Virginia, with 17.85 in (453 mm) of precipitation observed near Great Bridge. Numerous roads were washed out in several counties and independent cities, including Chesapeake, Franklin, Isle of Wight, Norfolk, Portsmouth, Southampton, Suffolk, and Virginia Beach. In Chesapeake, flood waters overwhelmed the sewer system, causing sewage to enter the city's water system and local waterways. Farther north, the remnants of the storm interacted with a frontal boundary, resulting in heavy rainfall in some portions of Delaware, Maryland, New Jersey, and Pennsylvania. Throughout its path, damage from the storm amounted to about $6.13 million.

== See also ==
- Other storms named Julia
- List of Florida hurricanes (2000–present)
- List of North Carolina hurricanes (2000–present)
- Hurricane Ophelia (2005)
- Tropical Storm Tammy (2005)
- Tropical Storm Ana (2015)
- Hurricane Sally (2020) – strengthened to a tropical storm over Southern Florida during the 2020 Atlantic hurricane season
- Brown ocean effect – a phenomenon that causes topical cyclones to intensify over land
