= List of storms named Jeanne =

The names Jeanne has been used for a total of four tropical cyclones worldwide, three in the Atlantic Ocean and one in the Western Pacific Ocean.

In the Atlantic Ocean:

- Hurricane Jeanne (1980) – a rare November hurricane in the Gulf of Mexico that caused no significant damage.
- Hurricane Jeanne (1998) – a Category 2 hurricane that brushed Cape Verde and travelled over the Azores as an extratropical cyclone.
- Hurricane Jeanne (2004) – a strong Category 3 hurricane that formed near the Lesser Antilles on September 14 and travelled across Puerto Rico and Hispaniola as a tropical storm, causing over 3,000 deaths in Haiti. Later crossed the Bahamas and made landfall near Stuart, Florida.

The name Jeanne was retired in the Atlantic after the 2004 season and was replaced by Julia for the 2010 season.

In the Western Pacific:

- Tropical Storm Jeanne (1952) (T5208)
