= 2024–2026 Cuba blackouts =

Nationwide series of power outages

- Power outage on the night of 4 December 2024
- Date: 2024 blackouts: 8–13 February 2024; 17–19 March 2024; 5–6 October 2024; 18–24 October 2024; 4–5 December 2024; 2025 blackouts: 10–11 September 2025; 3 December 2025; 2026 blackouts: 3–7 March 2026; 16–21 March 2026; 2–3 August 2026; 18–19 September 2026
- Location: Cuba (nationwide)
- Type: Total and partial power outages
- Cause: Fuel shortage; Lack of spare parts (February 2024); Failure of the Antonio Guiteras Power Plant (October 2024); United States embargo against Cuba
- Outcome: Cuban government-imposed energy-saving measures; Crackdown on protesters by the Cuban government

A series of interruptions to the nationwide electrical service of Cuba occurred since February 2024. The blackouts began in February 2024 with power outages that affected nearly half of the country. In March, further blackouts caused protests. On 5–6 October, a third of the country experienced outages. From 18 to 24 October 2024, a total nationwide blackout occurred due to the failure of the Antonio Guiteras Power Plant. During the October shutdowns, the Cuban government announced energy-saving measures. Blackouts continued in the latter half of 2025 from mechanical failures, weather, and continuing fuel and spare part shortages.

== History ==
=== 2024 ===
==== February ====
Parts of Cuba experienced blackouts starting from 8 February 2024. On 13 February, 45% of the country was affected by power outages.

==== March ====
In March 2024, Cuba experienced large-scale power outages, amidst an economic crisis that hit the country. The blackouts, which peaked on 17 March and typically lasted for up to 18 hours a day, were due to the frequent breakdowns of the Antonio Guiteras Thermoelectric Power Plant, the largest provider of electricity to the island, and the lack of fuel shipments from Cuba's allies Russia and Venezuela. Infrastructure problems within the country were also cited to be one of the key factors for the March blackouts. Hundreds of people in Cuba's second-largest city, Santiago de Cuba, protested to express their dissatisfaction with chronic power blackouts and food shortages.

==== October ====
On 5 October 2024, Cuba's electrical service experienced interruptions. The next day, a deficit of 1.045 gigawatts in the country's power output caused about a third of its population to go without power.

On 17 October 2024, a blackout left roughly half of Cuba without electricity, prompting the government of Cuba to announce energy-saving measures.

A total nationwide power outage began at around 11:00 local time on 18 October, after the Antonio Guiteras Power Plant in Matanzas, the country's largest, went offline, resulting in the loss of 1.64 gigawatts at peak hours, equivalent to half the total consumer demand. Power was partially restored for a short time before shutting down entirely again on 20 October. By 21 October, state media claimed that power had been restored to 50% of customers in Havana, while electricity had been restored to 70.89% of the nationwide population by 22 October. Some service disruptions were still reported on 23 October; however, it was reported that the power supply has been restored to the entire island the next day, according to the Cuba Tourist Board and Canadian airline Sunwing Airlines, which operates flights to several Cuban airports.

First Secretary of the Communist Party Miguel Díaz-Canel blamed the blackout on the United States embargo against Cuba, which he said prevented much needed supplies and replacement parts from reaching Cuba. Cuban Prime Minister Manuel Marrero Cruz blamed deteriorating infrastructure, fuel shortages and rising demand for the outages and said that the fuel shortages were the biggest factor. Cuba has suffered from a drop in fuel shipments from Venezuela in 2024.

All non-essential public services were suspended starting on 17 October and were to remain closed along with schools until 23 October. Dissemination of information related to Hurricane Oscar, which made landfall near Baracoa on 20 October, was interrupted.

Government celebrations for Cuban Culture Day scheduled for 21–23 October were cancelled, in an effort to reduce strain on the electrical network. First Secretary Díaz-Canel also cancelled his physical attendance at the 16th BRICS summit in Russia to attend to the blackout.

==== November ====
On 6 November, Hurricane Rafael made landfall near Playa Majana, Artemisa Province, causing a nationwide blackout.

==== December ====
On 4 December, the Antonio Guiteras thermoelectric plant failed again, causing a nationwide blackout.

=== 2025 ===
==== September ====
A 24-hour blackout ensued following a mechanical breakdown at one of Cuba's largest plants on 11 September 2025.

==== December ====
Following two days of peak-hour power shortages across the island, a transmission line failure on 3 December 2025 caused a 12-hour total blackout in the greater Havana region.

=== 2026 ===
Marco Rubio message to the Cuban People on 20 May 2026.

==== March ====
On 4 March, a blackout hit the western half of Cuba, leaving millions of people in Havana and surrounding areas without power. Government radio station Radio Rebelde quoted that it could take at least 72 hours to restore operations. The U.S. Embassy in Cuba issued a security alert and warned people for "significant disruptions". Further blackouts are predicted to occur due to the United States fuel blockade related to the 2026 crisis. On 16 and 21 March, the entire country suffered two more blackouts. Two Russian tankers are expected to deliver oil and diesel in late March, enough for a couple of weeks.

==== August ====
On 2 August, blackouts occurred in Cuba, with 10 million people being affected by the blackouts as reported by Union Electrica de Cuba, the state owned power grid operator.

==== September ====
From 18-19 September, a massive blackout left millions of people without electricity across the island. The Ministry of Energy and Mines issued a statement on X saying that they were "activating service-restoration protocols" to end the nationwide blackout. By 19 September, Union Electrica de Cuba has said that half of its customers in Havana have regained power.

== Reactions ==
=== Cuban government ===
Cuba denounced the U.S blockade as the cause of the blackouts (TeleSUR, May 2026).

First Secretary of the Communist Party of Cuba Miguel Díaz-Canel blamed the outages on difficulties in importing fuel and other resources due to "financial and energy persecution" by the United States. Local authorities noted causes including increased demand from small- and medium-sized companies and residential air conditioners, as well as poor maintenance of power plants.

Díaz-Canel also stated that any protests to the government's response would not be tolerated and that all protesters would be "processed rigorously under our revolutionary law". After protests started in October, Díaz-Canel and prime minister Manuel Marrero Cruz appeared on a televised address in military fatigues claiming "counter-revolutionaries from abroad" were fomenting protests in Cuba. Díaz-Canel also stated that "we have organized from the defense councils" and "we are not going to accept and we will not allow anyone to act by provoking vandalistic acts, much less disturbing the peace of our people, and that is a conviction and that is a principle of our revolution".

Energy Minister Vicente de la O Levy claimed the October outages would end by 21 or 22 October; Hurricane Oscar made landfall in Cuba on 20 October, disrupting efforts to restore the grid.

On 11 November 2026, Diaz-Canel has called for reforms on less power and food shortage following visits to the food ministries.

=== Protests ===
On 17 and 18 March 2024, blackouts alongside a poorer harvest and food shortages caused protests primarily in Santiago de Cuba, Cuba's second largest city, during which three people were arrested. Cuba accused the government of the United States of stirring up unrest, an accusation that the United States denied.

Protests also erupted hours after the October blackout began. Protesters in the Santos Suárez neighborhood of Havana constructed makeshift barricades in the streets. Without electricity, Havana's water pumps could not operate, nor could food be refrigerated, leaving some residents in a state of "desperation". In an effort to quell protests in Havana, the government cut internet access and deployed police formations to clear protesters by force. In Santiago de Cuba, police formations were deployed to deter protesters, some residents still took to the streets protesting the lack of electricity. Protests also took place in Manicaragua, where protesters surrounded the local government headquarters chanting "Down with!" and "Abusers!"

=== Humanitarian aid ===
In November 2024, Mexican president Claudia Sheinbaum has confirmed the shipment of approximately 500,000 barrels of oil to the island along with technicians to help assist the situation.

== See also ==
- 2024 Lebanon blackout
- 2024 Venezuelan blackouts
- 2018 Hokkaido Eastern Iburi earthquake#Damage and effects
