= List of storms named Julia =

The name Julia has been used for three tropical cyclones in the Atlantic Ocean and one European windstorm.

In the Atlantic, where Julia replaced Jeanne:

- Hurricane Julia (2010) – Category 4 hurricane, churned across the open ocean without threatening land
- Tropical Storm Julia (2016) – weak tropical storm, formed inland over Florida then caused minor damage along the Atlantic Coast of the United States
- Hurricane Julia (2022) – deadly Category 1 hurricane that made landfall in Nicaragua, crossed over intact into the eastern Pacific Ocean

In Europe:

- Cyclone Julia (2012) – brought heavy flooding and powerful winds to parts of Europe, the Mediterranean region and North Africa

== See also ==
- Cyclone Julie (1963) – a South-West Indian Ocean tropical cyclone with a similar name
