= Hurricane Oscar (2024) =

Category 1 Atlantic hurricane in 2024

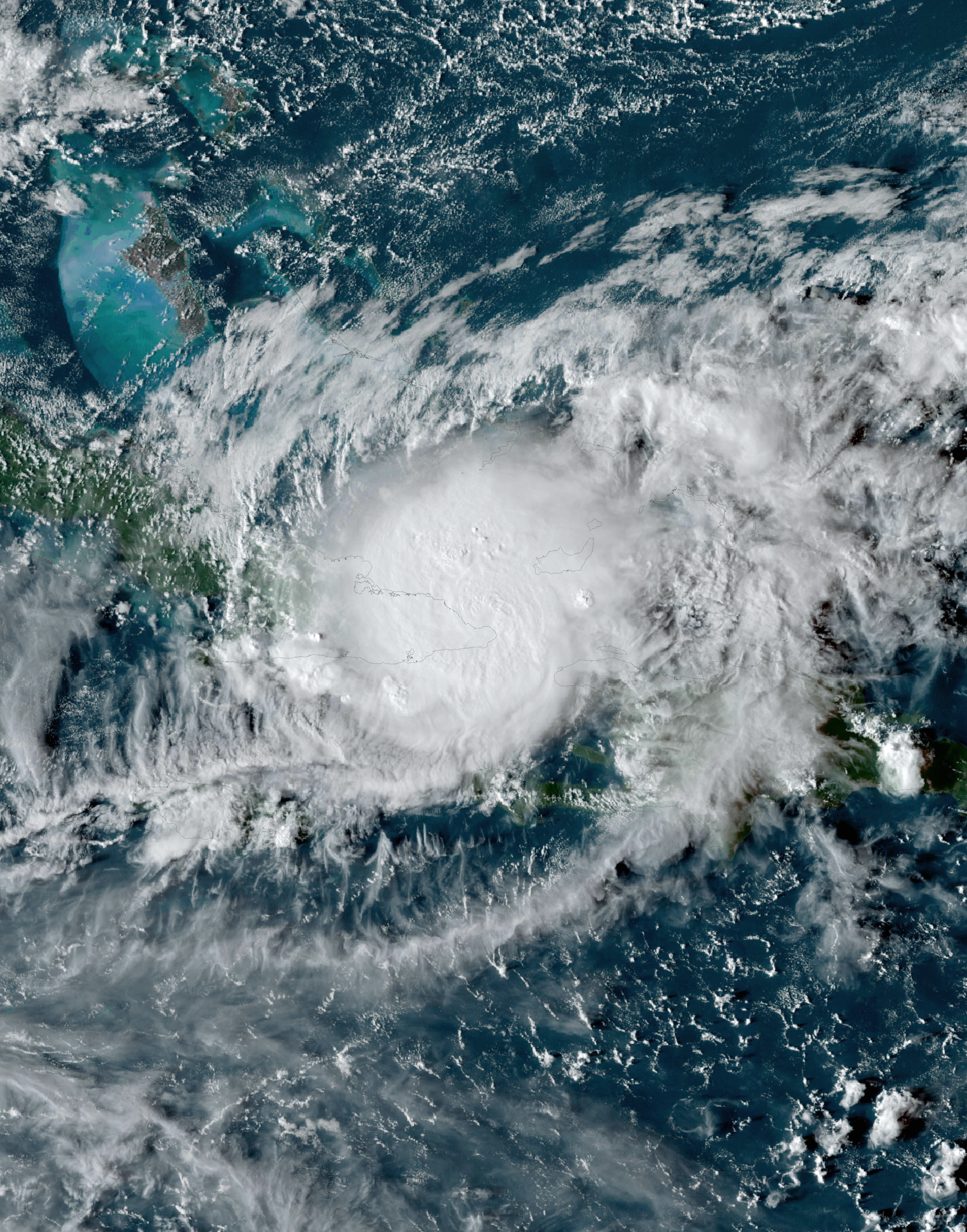
- Oscar making landfall in eastern Cuba at peak intensity on October 20

Meteorological history
- Formed: October 19, 2024
- Dissipated: October 22, 2024

Category 1 hurricane
- 1-minute sustained (SSHWS/NWS)
- Highest winds: 85 mph (140 km/h)
- Lowest pressure: 984 mbar (hPa); 29.06 inHg

Overall effects
- Fatalities: 8
- Missing: 2
- Damage: $50 million (2024 USD)
- Areas affected: Lucayan Archipelago; Eastern Cuba
- Part of the 2024 Atlantic hurricane season

Hurricane Oscar was a compact tropical cyclone that had the smallest hurricane-force wind field on record for an Atlantic hurricane. Oscar made landfall on Grand Turk Island and in eastern Cuba in late October 2024, where it caused moderate damage. The fifteenth named storm and tenth hurricane of the 2024 Atlantic hurricane season, Oscar originated from a long-lived tropical wave that moved off the coast of West Africa on October 10. The wave did not undergo tropical cyclogenesis until October 19, due to adverse atmospheric conditions. Oscar immediately began a round of rapid intensification, becoming a Category 1 hurricane that same day. After reaching its first peak intensity while passing over Grand Turk in the Turks and Caicos Islands, the storm moved slowly towards Cuba, making landfall late on October 20. Land interaction severely disrupted the system, and Oscar emerged north of Cuba as a minimal tropical storm with a poorly defined center. Unfavorable conditions continued to hamper the storm, and Oscar later dissipated on October 22 after opening into a trough.

Coastal watches and warnings for Oscar were issued for the Turks and Caicos Islands, southeastern Bahamas, and eastern Cuba on October 19, mere hours ahead of initial impacts. Eight people were confirmed to have died as a result of Oscar, all in Cuba. The total damage related to Oscar was estimated to be at US$50 million, primarily in Cuba. Its impact there was amplified by a severe national power outage, which began just prior to the storm's arrival.

== Meteorological history ==
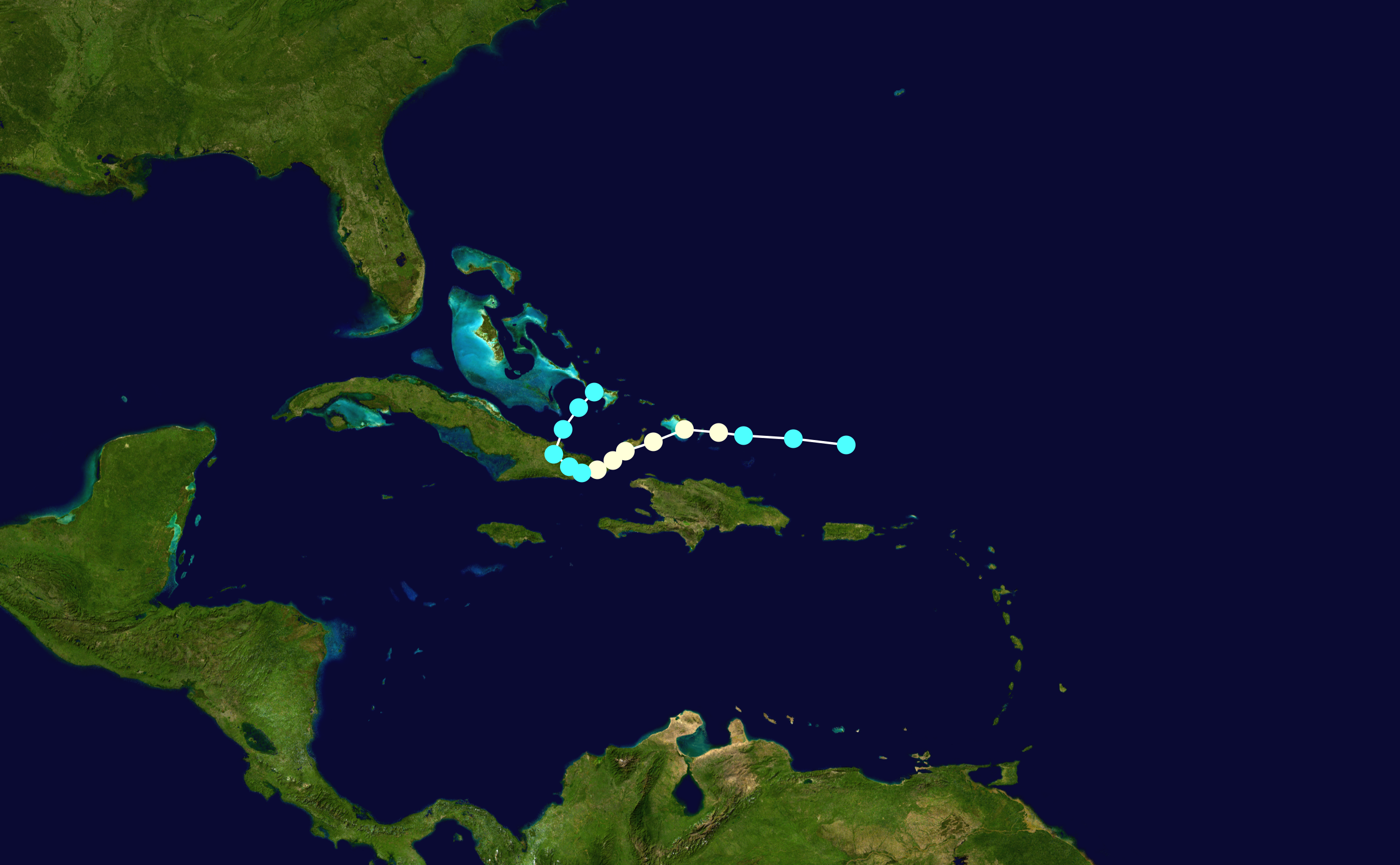
Map plotting the storm's track and intensity, according to the Saffir–Simpson scale Map key Saffir–Simpson scale Tropical depression (≤38 mph, ≤62 km/h) Tropical storm (39–73 mph, 63–118 km/h) Category 1 (74–95 mph, 119–153 km/h) Category 2 (96–110 mph, 154–177 km/h) Category 3 (111–129 mph, 178–208 km/h) Category 4 (130–156 mph, 209–251 km/h) Category 5 (≥157 mph, ≥252 km/h) Unknown Storm type Tropical cyclone Subtropical cyclone Extratropical cyclone, remnant low, tropical disturbance, or monsoon depression

On October 10, a tropical wave producing disorganized showers and thunderstorms exited the coast of West Africa. The system became better organized into the next day, as it moved westward through the Cape Verde islands, developing gale-force winds and decreasing pressure, though it remained disorganized and elongated. For several days, the low continued across the Atlantic Ocean, where westerly wind shear and dry air stifled the occasional burst of convective activity. Wind shear eventually lowered on October 14–15, though the wave would continue to degrade. Development was also hampered by the system's fast forward speed – west at 20 mph (30 km/h). Additionally, it was battling an unfavorable configuration of the Madden–Julian oscillation. Convection eventually began reorganizing on October 16–17, with fluctuations occurring diurnally. Investigations on October 17 indicated that the wave still lacked a closed circulation as it approached the Leeward Islands. By October 18, the doppler radar in San Juan showed that the disturbance had formed a mid-level vortex. Winds also returned to tropical storm strength. The environment remained favorable, with low wind shear and dry air concentrating convection. At 00:00 UTC on October 19, a closed circulation formed 180 miles (290 km) north of San Juan.

At the time, Oscar had a small central dense overcast fueled by hot towers, surrounded by well-defined rainbands. The storm moved westward, steered by a ridge to its north. Oscar's compact size and inner core structure, combined with very warm sea-surface temperatures and favorable atmospheric conditions, soon ignited a period of rapid intensification. Based on observations from Air Force Reserve Hurricane Hunters, Oscar reached hurricane intensity before 18:00 UTC on October 19. Oscar's eye was determined to be only 3.5 mi (5.6 km) in diameter. A few hours later, at 20:15 UTC, the hurricane reached an initial peak strength with winds of 85 mph (140 km/h), as it was making landfall on Grand Turk Island. Around this time, synthetic-aperture radar showed that hurricane-force winds extended only about 5.8 mi (9.3 km) out from the center. Additionally, the ridge that had been steering Oscar eroded, causing the storm to slow markedly. Then, after weakening slightly overnight, the hurricane's core passed along and just south of Inagua on the morning of October 20, while making a southwestward turn. That afternoon, while approaching Cuba, the storm restrengthened, attaining its peak intensity with maximum winds of 85 mph (140 km/h) and a minimum pressure of 984 mbar (29.06 inHg). At 21:50 UTC that same day, Oscar made landfall in eastern Cuba, near Baracoa.

After moving ashore, Oscar quickly weakened into a tropical storm. Then, while over the mountainous terrain of eastern Cuba, the storm's circulation became more disrupted, and its forward motion slowed to a 4 km/h (2.5 mph) crawl, as the steering currents over the system collapsed. The storm remained near stationary inland until a trough over the western Atlantic pulled Oscar northward, where its circulation emerged over the Atlantic early on October 22. While still producing tropical-storm-force winds, the system struggled to retain tropical characteristics. Oscar moved into the central Bahamas where it opened into a trough by 18:00 UTC on October 22; its remnants were soon fully absorbed by a larger extratropical cyclone.

=== Forecast errors and distinctions ===
Philippe Papin of the National Hurricane Center noted that Oscar "...kind of snuck up a little bit on us". As the predecessor to Oscar made its way north of the Greater Antilles, models began to stop showing tropical development in their forecasts. WPLG, a Miami-based news station, noted that forecast models likely struggled due to the small size of Oscar.

Oscar's hurricane-force wind field was the smallest on record in the Atlantic basin at a 5–6 miles (8.0–9.7 km) radius windfield. Due to its compact size, most satellites were unable to accurately measure its actual strength. RADARSAT, a high-resolution Canadian satellite, showed that Oscar could have peaked around Category 2 or 3 strength prior to landfall.

== Preparations and impacts ==
Emergency Response Coordination Centre map providing an overview of Hurricane Oscar

=== Cuba ===
The Government of Cuba issued a hurricane watch for the provinces of Guantánamo, Holguín, and Las Tunas on October 19. Dissemination of information related to Oscar was impeded by a country-wide blackout. Coordinators were also unable to communicate with one another without electricity. More than 15,000 people were evacuated in the nation, with 9,000 being evacuated in Imías and 6,000 evacuated in San Antonio del Sur.

As Oscar neared Cuba, a station in Cape Maisí saw a peak gust of 103 km/h (64 mph). Torrential downpours were recorded in Cuba. Valle de Caujerí, in the province of Guantánamo, received a total of 630.2 mm (24.81 in), including a record setting 250 mm (10 in) in one 3-hour period. A station in Maisí saw 366 mm (14.4 in) or rainfall, while in Baracoa, 268 mm (10.6 in) was seen. In Baracoa, waves produced by the hurricane breached the seawall, causing flooding along the city's coastline. Oscar caused severe damage in eastern Guantánamo. At least 2,282 homes were damaged, more than half of them with total roof collapses. Severe flooding occurred in Baracoa, Imías, and Maisí. Dozens homes lost their roofs and many power lines were downed. The rainfall and winds led to landslides, which also slowed the fixing of the blackout. In the Caujerí Valley, 200 hectares (2.0 km^{2}) of tomatoes were destroyed. Approximately 6,500 cans of coffee grains, along with large amounts of bananas and beans, were lost. The Cadena River was flooded. The Pozo Azul Dam reached 86% capacity while the Los Asientos Dam met capacity. The former saw false rumors spread online about a possible collapse. The Cuban Army denounced the rumors. Salt flats owned by the Salinera Company received serious damage from Oscar. Eight people were killed from the storm: six in San Antonio and one in Imías. Two people were also reported missing. The total damage related to Oscar was estimated to be at US$50 million according to Aon, primarily in Cuba.

A ship was sent from Pajaritos, Veracruz, to Cuba, with 400,000 barrels of oil to alleviate the power crisis worsened by Oscar.

Still recovering from Oscar, eastern Cuba was rattled by a 6.8-magnitude earthquake on November 10. Hurricane Melissa would also landfall in Cuba a year later, damaging infrastructure in areas recovering from Oscar.

=== Elsewhere ===
On the afternoon of October 19, the Government of the Bahamas issued a hurricane warning for the Turks and Caicos Islands and Southeastern Bahamas. The Central Bahamas were later placed under tropical storm warning on October 21. The Turks and Caicos Islands Airport Authority closed JAGS McCartney International Airport, Norman B. Saunders International Airport, and Leon Wilson Airport. The Bahamian Disaster Risk Management (DRM) Authority activated its team on October 19.

Matthew Town experienced winds from the core of Oscar. On Grand Turk, where the capital of the Turks and Caicos Islands is located, Oscar knocked down some trees and removed the roofs of at least one house. In Inagua, multiple homes sustained broken windows and damaged roofs. Also, numerous trees were uprooted and power lines were damaged. However, as there was a low tide, the hurricane caused minimal impacts in the islands. A shelter in Inagua housed 24 people. The DRM Authority sent food items to the southern islands after Oscar had left.

The remnants of Oscar, along with a tropical wave and trough, generated thunderstorms over Puerto Rico. Around 2–3 in (51–76 mm) of rain fell, causing localized flooding and landslides along roadways in Puerto Rico, rendering them impassable. Numerous people required rescue from rising floodwaters. Damage to the region totaled US$6,000.

The remnants of Oscar increased surf in the Northeastern United States coast.

== See also ==
- Other storms of the same name
- Weather of 2024
- Tropical cyclones in 2024
- Timeline of the 2024 Atlantic hurricane season
- List of Category 1 Atlantic hurricanes
- List of Cuba hurricanes
- Hurricanes in the Bahama Archipelago
- Tropical Storm Marco (2008) – the smallest tropical cyclone on record both in the Atlantic basin and worldwide.
