= Saffir–Simpson scale =

Tropical cyclone intensity scale

Saffir–Simpson scale, 1-minute maximum sustained winds
Category	m/s	knots	mph	km/h
5	≥ 70	≥ 137	≥ 157	≥ 252
4	58–70	113–136	130–156	209–251
3	50–58	96–112	111–129	178–208
2	43–49	83–95	96–110	154–177
1	33–42	64–82	74–95	119–153
TS	18–32	34–63	39–73	63–118
TD	≤ 17	≤ 33	≤ 38	≤ 62

The Saffir–Simpson hurricane wind scale (SSHWS) is a tropical cyclone intensity scale that classifies hurricanes—which in the Western Hemisphere are tropical cyclones that exceed the intensities of tropical depressions and tropical storms—into five categories distinguished by the intensities of their sustained winds. This measuring system was formerly known as the Saffir–Simpson hurricane scale, or SSHS.

To be classified as a hurricane, a tropical cyclone must have one-minute-average maximum sustained winds at 10 m (33 ft) above the surface of at least 74 mph (64 kn, 119 km/h; Category 1). The highest classification in the scale, Category 5, consists of storms with sustained winds of at least 157 mph (137 kn, 252 km/h). The classifications can provide some indication of the potential damage and flooding a hurricane will cause upon landfall.

The Saffir–Simpson hurricane wind scale is based on the highest wind speed averaged over a one-minute interval 10 m above the surface. Although the scale shows wind speeds in continuous speed ranges, the US National Hurricane Center and the Central Pacific Hurricane Center assign tropical cyclone intensities in 5-knot (kn) increments (e.g., 100, 105, 110, 115 kn, etc.) because of the inherent uncertainty in estimating the strength of tropical cyclones. Wind speeds in knots are then converted to other units and rounded to the nearest 5 mph or 5 km/h.

The Saffir–Simpson hurricane wind scale is used officially only to describe hurricanes that form in the Atlantic Ocean and northern Pacific Ocean east of the International Date Line. Other areas use different scales to label these storms, which are called cyclones or typhoons, depending on the area. These areas (except the JTWC) use three-minute or ten-minute averaged winds to determine the maximum sustained wind speed, creating an important difference which frustrates direct comparison between maximum wind speeds of storms measured using the Saffir–Simpson hurricane wind scale (usually 14% more intense) and those measured using a ten-minute interval (usually 12% less intense).

There is some criticism of the SSHWS for not accounting for rain, storm surge, and other important factors, but SSHWS defenders say that part of the goal of SSHWS is to be straightforward and simple to understand. There have been proposals for the addition of higher categories to the scale, which would then set a maximum cutoff for Category 5, but none have been adopted as of October 2025.

== History ==
In 1971, the scale was developed by civil engineer Herbert Saffir and meteorologist Robert Simpson, who at the time was director of the U.S. National Hurricane Center (NHC). In 1973, the scale was introduced to the general public, and saw widespread use after Neil Frank replaced Simpson at the helm of the NHC in 1974.

The scale was created by Herbert Saffir, a structural engineer, who in 1969 was commissioned by the United Nations to study low-cost housing in hurricane-prone areas. In 1971, while conducting the study, Saffir realized there was no simple scale for describing the likely effects of a hurricane. By using subjective damage-based scales for earthquake intensity like the Modified Mercalli intensity scale or MSK-64 intensity scale and the objective numerical gradation method of the Richter scale as models, he proposed a simplified 1–5 grading scale as a guide for areas that do not have hurricane building codes. The grades were based on two main factors: objective wind gust speeds sustaining for 2–3 seconds at an elevation of 9.2 meters, and subjective levels of structural damage.

Proposed Hurricane Damage Scale (UN 1974)
Grade	Wind Speed Range
Grade 1	120–150 km/h
Grade 2	151–180 km/h
Grade 3	181–210 km/h
Grade 4	211–240 km/h
Grade 5	241+ km/h

Saffir gave the proposed scale to the NHC for their use, where Simpson changed the terminology from "grade" to "category", organized them by sustained wind speeds of 1 minute duration, and added storm surge height ranges, adding barometric pressure ranges later on. In 1975, the Saffir–Simpson Scale was first published publicly.

In 2009, the NHC eliminated pressure and storm surge ranges from the categories, transforming it into a pure wind scale, called the Saffir–Simpson Hurricane Wind Scale (Experimental) [SSHWS]. The updated scale became operational on May 15, 2010. The scale excludes flood ranges, storm surge estimations, rainfall, and location, which means a Category 2 hurricane that hits a major city will likely do far more cumulative damage than a Category 5 hurricane that hits a rural area. The agency cited examples of hurricanes as reasons for removing "scientifically inaccurate" information, including Hurricane Katrina (2005) and Hurricane Ike (2008), which both had stronger than estimated storm surges, and Hurricane Charley (2013), which had weaker than estimated storm surge. Since being removed from the Saffir–Simpson hurricane wind scale, storm surge prediction and modeling is handled by computer numerical models such as ADCIRC and SLOSH.

In 2012, the NHC extended the wind speed range for Category 4 by 1 mph in both directions, to 130–156 mph, with corresponding changes in the other units (113–136 kn, 209–251 km/h), instead of 131–155 mph (114–135 kn, 210–249 km/h). The NHC and the Central Pacific Hurricane Center assign tropical cyclone intensities in 5 knot increments, and then convert to mph and km/h with a similar rounding for other reports. So an intensity of 115 kn is rated Category 4, but the conversion to miles per hour (132.3 mph) would round down to 130 mph, making it appear to be a Category 3 storm. Likewise, an intensity of 135 kn (~155 mph, and thus Category 4) is 250.02 km/h, which, according to the definition used before the change would be Category 5.

To resolve these issues, the NHC had been obliged to incorrectly report storms with wind speeds of 115 kn as 135 mph, and 135 kn as 245 km/h. The change in definition allows storms of 115 kn to be correctly rounded down to 130 mph, and storms of 135 kn to be correctly reported as 250 km/h, and still qualify as Category 4. Since the NHC had previously rounded incorrectly to keep storms in Category 4 in each unit of measure, the change does not affect the classification of storms from previous years. The new scale became operational on May 15, 2012.

== Categories ==
The scale separates hurricanes into five different categories based on wind. The U.S. National Hurricane Center classifies hurricanes of Category 3 and above as major hurricanes. The Joint Typhoon Warning Center classifies typhoons of 150 mph (240 km/h) or greater (strong Category 4 and Category 5) as super typhoons. Most weather agencies use the definition for sustained winds recommended by the World Meteorological Organization (WMO), which specifies measuring winds at a height of 33 ft (10.1 m) for 10 minutes, and then taking the average. By contrast, the U.S. National Weather Service, Central Pacific Hurricane Center and the Joint Typhoon Warning Center define sustained winds as average winds over a period of one minute, measured at the same 33 ft (10.1 m) height, and that is the definition used for this scale.

The five categories are described in the following subsections, in order of increasing intensity. Example hurricanes for each category are limited to those which made landfall at their maximum achieved category on the scale.

=== Category 1 ===
Category 1
Sustained winds	Most recent landfall
33–42 m/s 64–82 kn 119–153 km/h 74–95 mph	Oscar in 2024 at landfall in Cuba

Very dangerous winds will produce some damage

Category 1 storms usually cause no significant structural damage to most well-constructed permanent structures. They can topple unanchored mobile homes, as well as uproot or snap weak trees. Poorly attached roof shingles or tiles can blow off. Coastal flooding and pier damage are often associated with Category 1 storms. Power outages are typically widespread to extensive, sometimes lasting several days. Even though it is the least intense type of hurricane, they can still produce widespread damage and can be life-threatening storms.

Hurricanes that peaked at Category 1 intensity and made landfall at that intensity include: Juan (1985), Ismael (1995), Danny (1997), Stan (2005), Humberto (2007), Isaac (2012), Manuel (2013), Earl (2016), Newton (2016), Nate (2017), Barry (2019), Lorena (2019), Hanna (2020), Isaias (2020), Nicholas (2021), Pamela (2021), Julia (2022), Nicole (2022), Debby (2024), and Oscar (2024).

=== Category 2 ===
Category 2
Sustained winds	Most recent landfall
43–49 m/s 83–95 kn 154–177 km/h 96–110 mph	Francine in 2024 at landfall near Morgan City, Louisiana

Extremely dangerous winds will cause extensive damage

Storms of Category 2 intensity often damage roofing material, sometimes exposing the roof, and inflict damage upon poorly constructed doors and windows. Poorly constructed signs and piers can receive considerable damage and many trees are uprooted or snapped. Mobile homes, whether anchored or not, are typically damaged and sometimes destroyed, and many manufactured homes suffer structural damage. Small craft in unprotected anchorages may break their moorings. Extensive to near-total power outages and scattered loss of potable water are likely, possibly lasting many days.

Hurricanes that peaked at Category 2 intensity and made landfall at that intensity include: Alice (1954), Ella (1958), Ginny (1963), Fifi (1974), Diana (1990), Gert (1993), Rosa (1994), Erin (1995), Alma (1996), Marty (2003), Juan (2003), Alex (2010), Tomas (2010), Carlotta (2012), Arthur (2014), Sally (2020), Olaf (2021), Rick (2021), Agatha (2022), and Francine (2024).

=== Category 3 ===
Category 3
Sustained winds	Most recent landfall
50–58 m/s 96–112 kn 178–208 km/h 111–129 mph	Rafael in 2024 just prior to its landfall in Cuba

Devastating damage will occur

Tropical cyclones of Category 3 and higher are described as major hurricanes in the Atlantic, Eastern Pacific, and Central Pacific basins. These storms can cause some structural damage to small residences and utility buildings, particularly those of wood frame or manufactured materials with minor curtain wall failures. Buildings that lack a solid foundation, such as mobile homes, are usually destroyed, and gable-end roofs are peeled off.

Manufactured homes usually sustain severe and irreparable damage. Flooding near the coast destroys smaller structures, while larger structures are struck by floating debris. A large number of trees are uprooted or snapped, isolating many areas. Terrain may be flooded well inland. Near-total to total power loss is likely for up to several weeks. Home water access will likely be lost or contaminated.

Hurricanes that peaked at Category 3 intensity and made landfall at that intensity include: Easy (1950), Carol (1954), Hilda (1955), Audrey (1957), Olivia (1967), Eloise (1975), Alicia (1983), Elena (1985), Kiko (1989), Roxanne (1995), Fran (1996), Isidore (2002), Jeanne (2004), Lane (2006), Karl (2010), Otto (2016), Zeta (2020), Grace (2021), John (2024), and Rafael (2024).

=== Category 4 ===
Category 4
Sustained winds	Most recent landfall
58–70 m/s 113–136 kn 209–251 km/h 130–156 mph	Helene in 2024 just prior to its Florida Big Bend landfall

Catastrophic damage will occur

Category 4 hurricanes tend to produce more extensive curtainwall failures, with some complete structural failure on small residences. Heavy, irreparable damage and near-complete destruction of gas station canopies and other wide span overhang type structures are common. Mobile and manufactured homes are often flattened. Most trees, except for the hardiest, are uprooted or snapped, isolating many areas. These storms cause extensive beach erosion. Terrain may be flooded far inland. Total and long-lived electrical and water losses are to be expected, possibly for many weeks.

The 1900 Galveston hurricane, the deadliest natural disaster to hit the United States, peaked at an intensity that corresponds to a modern-day Category 4 storm. Other examples of storms that peaked at Category 4 intensity and made landfall at that intensity include: Hazel (1954), Gracie (1959), Donna (1960), Carla (1961), Flora (1963), Betsy (1965), Carmen (1974), Madeline (1976), Frederic (1979), Joan (1988), Iniki (1992), Charley (2004), Dennis (2005), Ike (2008), Harvey (2017), Laura (2020), Eta (2020), Ida (2021), Lidia (2023), and Helene (2024).

=== Category 5 ===
Category 5
Sustained winds	Most recent landfall
≥ 70 m/s ≥ 137 kn ≥ 252 km/h ≥ 157 mph	Melissa in 2025 at its record peak intensity before making landfall in Jamaica

Catastrophic damage will occur

Category 5 is the highest category of the Saffir–Simpson scale. These storms cause complete roof failure on many residences and industrial buildings, and some complete building failures with small utility buildings blown over or away. The collapse of many wide-span roofs and walls, especially those with no interior supports, is common. Very heavy and irreparable damage to many wood-frame structures and total destruction to mobile/manufactured homes is prevalent.

Only a few types of structures are capable of surviving intact, and only if located at least 3 to 5 miles (5 to 8 km) inland. They include office, condominium and apartment buildings and hotels that are of solid concrete or steel frame construction, multi-story concrete parking garages, and residences that are made of either reinforced brick or concrete/cement block and have hipped roofs with slopes of no less than 35 degrees from horizontal and no overhangs of any kind, and if the windows are either made of hurricane-resistant safety glass or covered with shutters. Unless most of these requirements are met, the catastrophic destruction of a structure may occur.

The storm's flooding causes major damage to the lower floors of all structures near the shoreline. Many coastal structures can be completely flattened or washed away by the storm surge. Virtually all trees are uprooted or snapped and some may be debarked, isolating most affected communities. Massive evacuation of residential areas may be required if the hurricane threatens populated areas. Total and extremely long-lived power outages and water losses are to be expected, possibly for up to several months.

Historical examples of storms that made landfall at Category 5 status include: "Cuba" (1924), "Okeechobee" (1928), "Bahamas" (1932), "Cuba–Brownsville" (1933), "Labor Day" (1935), Janet (1955), Inez (1966), Camille (1969), Anita (1977), David (1979), Gilbert (1988), Andrew (1992), Dean (2007), Felix (2007), Irma (2017), Maria (2017), Michael (2018), Dorian (2019), Otis (2023; the only Pacific hurricane to make landfall at Category 5 intensity), and Melissa (2025).

== Criticism ==
Some scientists, including Kerry Emanuel and Lakshmi Kantha, have criticized the scale as being too simplistic, namely that the scale takes into account neither the physical size of a storm nor the amount of precipitation it produces. They and others point out that the Saffir–Simpson scale, unlike the moment magnitude scale used to measure earthquakes, is not continuous, and is quantized into a small number of categories. Proposed replacement classifications include the Hurricane Intensity Index, which is based on the dynamic pressure caused by a storm's winds, and the Hurricane Hazard Index, which is based on surface wind speeds, the radius of maximum winds of the storm, and its translational velocity. Both of these scales are continuous, akin to the Richter scale. However, neither of these scales has been used by officials.

New proposed scales include those based on factors other than peak wind speed alone. One proposal involves separate scales for wind, for storm surge, and for rainfall. Another involves a combination of storm surge, rainfall, and wind. A further proposal focuses on "central pressure deficit"—the difference in barometric pressure between the center of the storm and outside it—as an overall intensity metric correlating better with damage and being easier to measure.

=== Proposed extensions ===
After the series of powerful storm systems of the 2005 Atlantic hurricane season, as well as after Hurricane Patricia, a few newspaper columnists and scientists brought up the suggestion of introducing Category 6. They have suggested pegging Category 6 to storms with winds greater than 174 or 180 mph (78 or 80 m/s; 151 or 156 kn; 280 or 290 km/h). Fresh calls were made for consideration of the issue after Hurricane Irma in 2017, which was the subject of a number of seemingly credible false news reports as a "Category 6" storm, partly in consequence of so many local politicians using the term. Only a few storms of this intensity have been recorded.

Of the 44 hurricanes currently considered to have attained Category 5 status in the Atlantic, 20 had wind speeds at 175 mph (78 m/s; 152 kn; 282 km/h) or greater. Only 10 had wind speeds at 180 mph (80.5 m/s; 156 kn; 290 km/h) or greater (the 1935 Labor Day hurricane, Allen, Gilbert, Mitch, Rita, Wilma, Irma, Dorian, Milton, and Melissa). Of the 24 hurricanes currently considered to have attained Category 5 status in the eastern Pacific, only 6 had wind speeds at 175 mph (78 m/s; 152 kn; 282 km/h) or greater (Patsy, John, Linda, Rick, Patricia, and Polo). Only 4 had wind speeds at 180 mph (80.5 m/s; 156 kn; 290 km/h) or greater (Linda, Rick, Patricia, and Polo).

Most storms which would be eligible for this category were typhoons in the western Pacific, where the scale is not officially used, most notably typhoons Tip, Halong, Mawar, and Bolaven in 1979, 2019, and 2023 (2 storms) respectively, each with sustained winds of 190 mph (305 km/h), and typhoons Haiyan, Meranti, Goni, and Surigae in 2013, 2016, 2020, and 2021 respectively, each with sustained winds of 195 mph (315 km/h).

Occasionally, suggestions of using even higher wind speeds as the cutoff have been made. In a newspaper article published in November 2018, NOAA research scientist Jim Kossin said that the potential for more intense hurricanes was increasing as the climate warmed, and suggested that Category 6 would begin at 195 mph (85 m/s; 170 kn; 315 km/h), with a further hypothetical Category 7 beginning at 230 mph (105 m/s; 200 kn; 370 km/h). In 2024 another proposal to add "Category 6" was made, with a minimum wind speed of 192 mph (309 km/h), with risk factors such as the effects of climate change and warming ocean temperatures part of that research. In the NHC area of responsibility, only Patricia had winds greater than 190 mph (85 m/s; 165 kn; 305 km/h).

According to Robert Simpson, co-creator of the scale, there are no reasons for a Category 6 on the Saffir–Simpson scale because it is designed to measure the potential damage of a hurricane to human-made structures. Simpson explained that "... when you get up into winds in excess of 155 mph (249 km/h) you have enough damage if that extreme wind sustains itself for as much as six seconds on a building it's going to cause rupturing damages that are serious no matter how well it's engineered." Nonetheless, the counties of Broward and Miami-Dade in Florida have building codes which require that critical infrastructure buildings be able to withstand Category 5 winds.

== See also ==
- Accumulated cyclone energy
- Beaufort scale – Relates wind speed to observable conditions at sea and on land
- Enhanced Fujita scale – For tornado intensity with damage correlated to wind speeds. The system was also intended for applicability in hurricanes, and is utilized by engineers in hurricane damage assessment.
- Hurricane engineering
- Hypercane
- Outline of tropical cyclones
- Rohn emergency scale for measuring the magnitude (intensity) of any emergency
