= 2024 Pacific typhoon season =

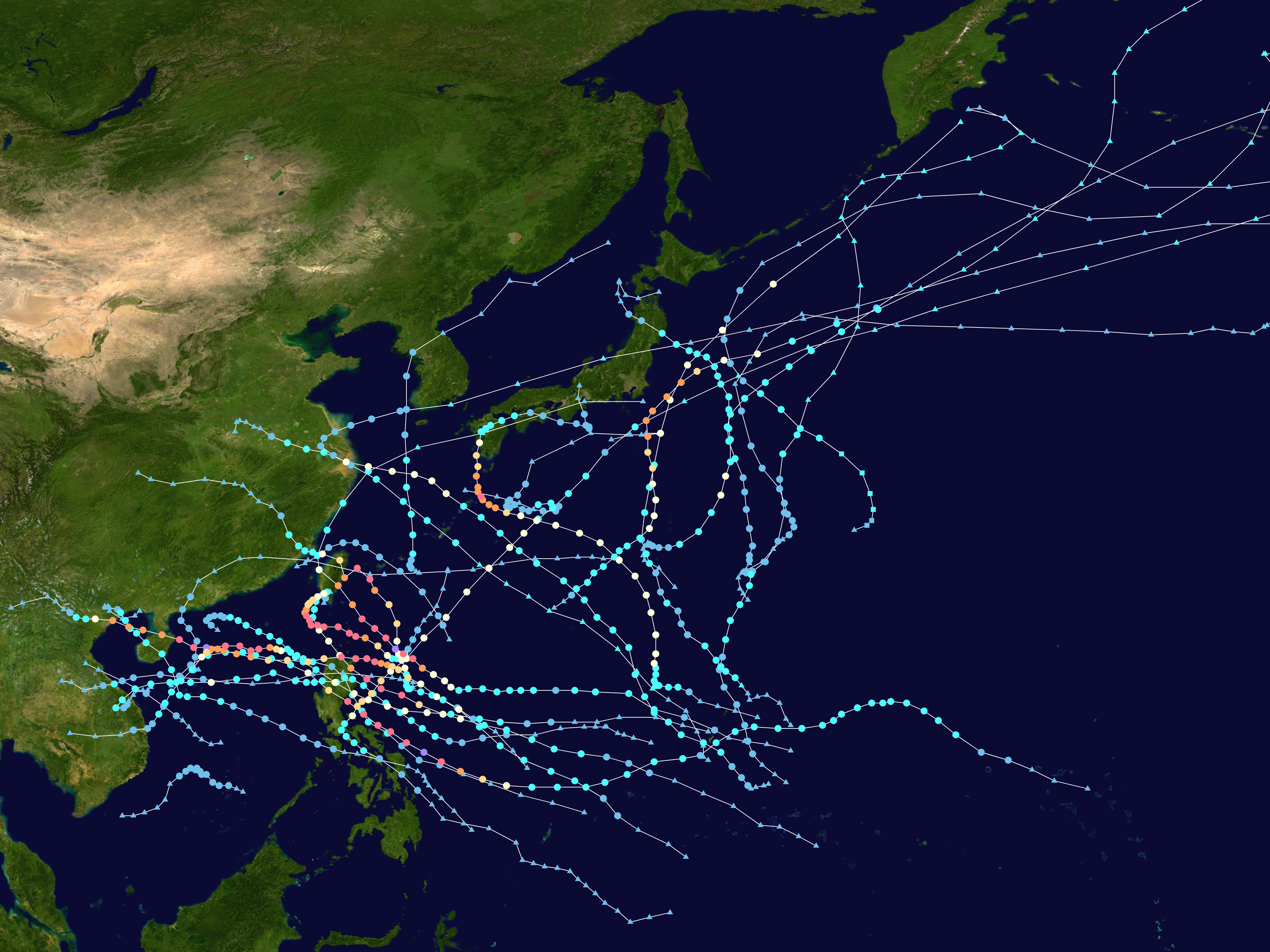
- Season summary map

Seasonal boundaries
- First system formed: May 23, 2024
- Last system dissipated: December 25, 2024

Strongest storm
- Name: Yagi
  - Maximum winds: 195 km/h (120 mph) (10-minute sustained)
  - Lowest pressure: 915 hPa (mbar)

Seasonal statistics
- Total depressions: 38
- Total storms: 26
- Typhoons: 13
- Very strong typhoons: 8
- Violent typhoons: 3
- Total fatalities: 1,336 total
- Total damage: $29.65 billion (2024 USD) (Fourth-costliest Pacific typhoon season on record)

Related articles
- Timeline of the 2024 Pacific typhoon season; 2024 Atlantic hurricane season; 2024 Pacific hurricane season; 2024 North Indian Ocean cyclone season

The 2024 Pacific typhoon season was a deadly and destructive season that became the deadliest since 2013. It was a below-average season in terms of accumulated cyclone energy (ACE), but was average in the number of named storms, and typhoons, ending a four-year streak of below-average seasons that began in 2020. The season was also the fifth-latest Pacific typhoon season and the first to start that late since 2020. Moreover, this season saw an unusually active November, with the month experiencing four simultaneously active typhoons since 2019 and featuring the most retired names in a single season—nine. Additionally, the Philippines also saw multiple consecutive typhoons making direct landfalls since 2006, with some at higher intensities.

Of the 26 named tropical storms, 13 became typhoons. The season ran throughout the year, though most tropical cyclones typically develop between May and November. The season's first named storm, Ewiniar, developed on May 25 and eventually intensified into the first typhoon of the season, while the last named storm, Pabuk, dissipated on December 25. Furthermore, Yagi became the season’s first super typhoon, as well being the strongest storm of this season on September 5 before it devastated Hainan and in Vietnam on September 7, becoming one of the strongest typhoons in 70 years to strike Vietnam according to the country’s government.

The scope of this article is limited to the Pacific Ocean to the north of the equator between 100°E and 180th meridian. Within the northwestern Pacific Ocean, there are two separate agencies that assign names to tropical cyclones which can often result in a cyclone having two names. The Japan Meteorological Agency (JMA) (Note: The Japan Meteorological Agency is the official Regional Specialized Meteorological Center for the western Pacific Ocean.) will name a tropical cyclone if it has 10-minute sustained wind speeds of at least 65 km/h (40 mph) anywhere in the basin. The Philippine Atmospheric, Geophysical and Astronomical Services Administration (PAGASA) assigns names to tropical cyclones which move into or form as a tropical depression in the Philippine Area of Responsibility (PAR), located between 135°E and 115°E and between 5°N and 25°N, regardless of whether or not a tropical cyclone has already been given a name by the JMA. Tropical depressions that are monitored by the United States' Joint Typhoon Warning Center (JTWC) (Note: The Joint Typhoon Warning Center is a joint United States Navy – United States Air Force task force that issues tropical cyclone warnings for the western Pacific Ocean and other regions.) (Note: A super typhoon is an unofficial category used by the Joint Typhoon Warning Center (JTWC) for a typhoon with winds of at least 240 km/h (150 mph).) are given a number with a "W" suffix; W meaning west, a reference to the western Pacific region.

== Seasonal forecasts ==
TSR forecasts Date	Tropical storms	Total Typhoons	Intense TCs	ACE	Ref.
Average (1991–2020)	25.5	16.0	9.3	301	
May 7, 2024	25	15	7	225	
July 5, 2024	24	14	7	211	
August 7, 2024	24	14	7	177	
Other forecasts Date	Forecast Center	Period	Systems		Ref.
January 15, 2024	PAGASA	January–March	0–2 tropical cyclones		
January 15, 2024	PAGASA	April–June	2–4 tropical cyclones		
June 26, 2024	PAGASA	July–September	6–10 tropical cyclones		
June 26, 2024	PAGASA	October–December	4–7 tropical cyclones		
2024 season	Forecast Center	Tropical cyclones	Tropical storms	Typhoons	Ref.
Actual activity:	JMA	38	26	13	
Actual activity:	JTWC	28	21	14	
Actual activity:	PAGASA	18	13	10	

During the year, several national meteorological services and scientific agencies forecast how many tropical cyclones, tropical storms, and typhoons will form during a season and/or how many tropical cyclones will affect a particular country. These agencies included the Tropical Storm Risk (TSR) Consortium of University College London, PAGASA, Vietnam's National Center for Hydro-Meteorological Forecasting and Taiwan's Central Weather Administration.

PAGASA released its first outlook on January 15 in their seasonal climate outlook predicting the first half of 2024. They predicted that zero to two tropical cyclones were expected to form, while two to four tropical cyclones are expected to form in April to June. PAGASA also noted that El Niño would persist between January and March; however, warmer than normal sea surface temperatures would gradually weaken.

Tropical Storm Risk (TSR) also released their first forecast on May 7, predicting below average activity with 25 named storms, 15 typhoons and 7 intense typhoons. This was primarily due to the dominant El Niño event at the time, which was expected to transition into a weak or moderate La Niña by mid-2024. TSR released their early July forecast on July 5, where they slightly decreased the amount of storms and typhoons, mentioning the same factors as their previous forecast. On August 7, TSR released their final forecast for the season, retaining the same number of storms. However, they further decreased the predicted ACE index, due to a slow start of the season and decreased tropical activity as of early August. Moreover, with the Pacific Decadal Oscillation being in a negative phase since the beginning of 2020, they also mentioned how this season could become the lowest five-year activity since 1965.

PAGASA released its second and final outlook on June 26, predicting 6-10 tropical cyclones to form between July to September, while 4-7 of those are expected to form between October to December. PAGASA also noted that El Niño conditions had also ended and a transition from neutral ENSO to La Niña is also likely between the former months.

== Systems ==
=== Typhoon Ewiniar (Aghon) ===
- Typhoon (JMA)
- Category 2 typhoon (SSHWS)
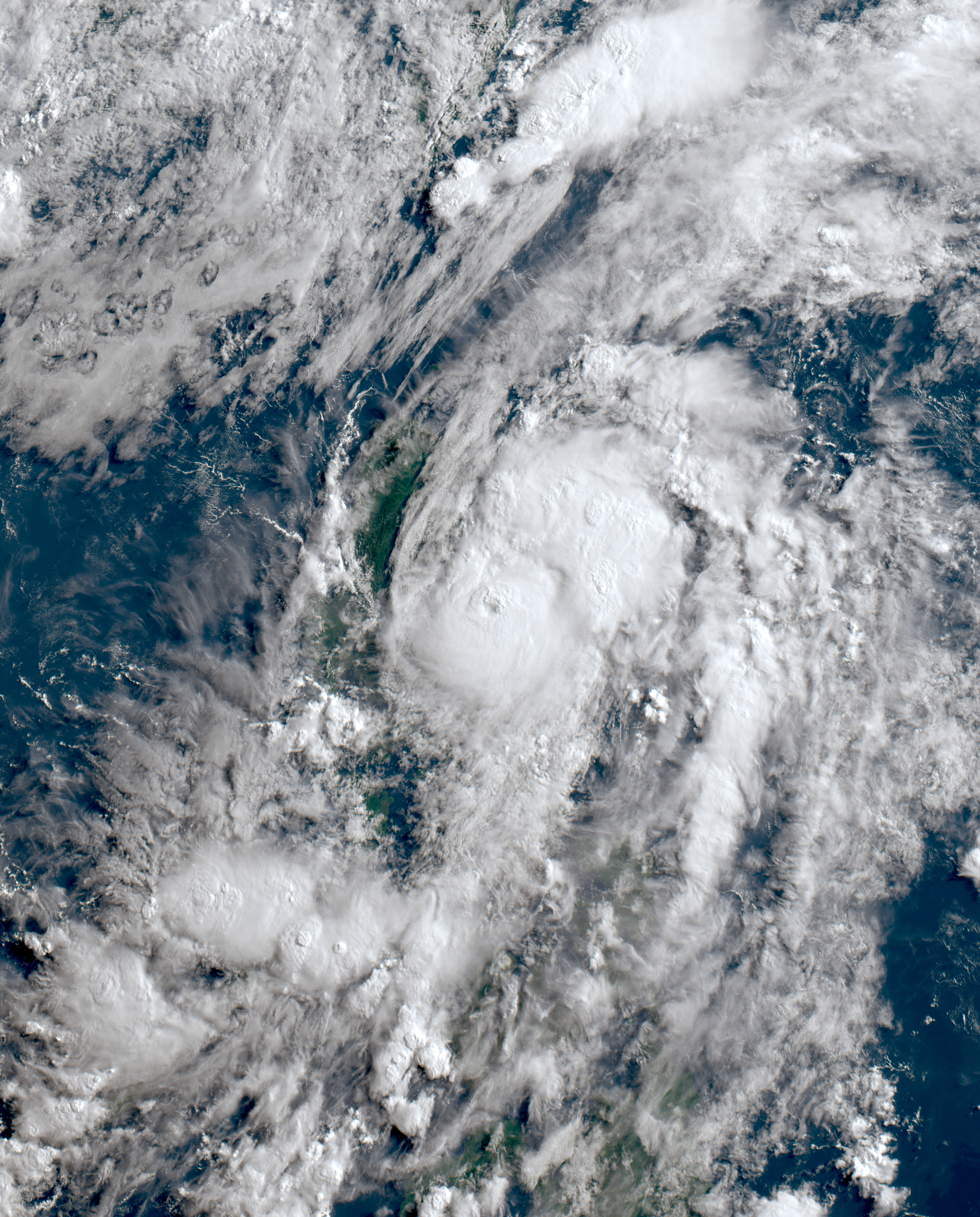
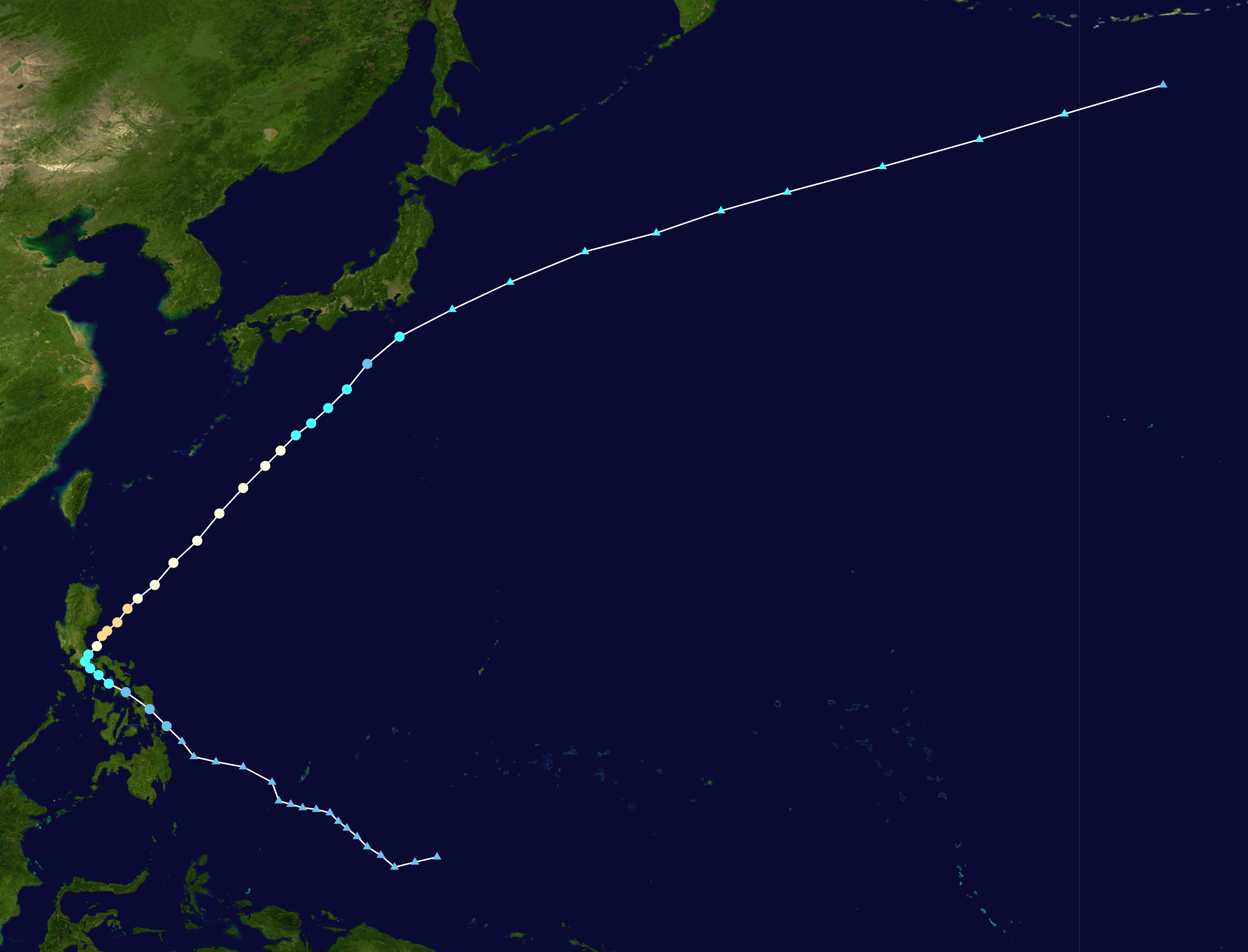
- Duration: May 23 – May 30
- Peak intensity: 140 km/h (85 mph) (10-min); 970 hPa (mbar)

On May 21, the Joint Typhoon Warning Center (JTWC) began tracking an area of atmospheric convection 441 km (274 mi) southeast of Palau, noting that the system was moving northwestward towards an environment favorable for tropical cyclogenesis. By May 23, the disturbance became a tropical depression. The depression would later enter PAR, assigning the name Aghon, a replacement name for Ambo. At 18:00 UTC, the JTWC designated the depression as 01W, based on surface observations from Guiuan. Aghon made landfall over Homonhon Island and subsequently Giporlos, Eastern Samar in the early morning of May 25 (PHT). It made five more landfalls over Basiao and Cagduyong Islands of Catbalogan; Batuan in Ticao Island; Masbate City; and Torrijos, Marinduque. At 12:00 UTC, 01W intensified into a tropical storm while it was still in Tayabas Bay, which prompted the JMA to name the storm as Ewiniar. In the morning of May 26 (PHT), the storm made its eighth landfall over Lucena, Quezon in Luzon island. Ewiniar later intensified into a typhoon over Lamon Bay The storm made its final landfall over Patnanungan in the Polillo Islands. The typhoon left the PAR on May 29 and continued to weaken due to subsidence around the mid-latitude. On May 30, Ewiniar transitioned into an extratropical cyclone south-southwest of Yokosuka, Japan. Then at 18:00 UTC on May 31, Ewiniar entered the baroclinic zone and an area of high wind shear.

Ewiniar resulted in ₱1.03 billion (US$20.88 million) in total damages in the Philippines, with ₱85.63 million (US$1.74 million) to agriculture and ₱942.55 million (US$19.14 million) to infrastructure, while also causing six deaths, injuring eight people, and impacting around 152,266 others. In Japan, heavy rainfall was observed in several regions, with a maximum of 52.5 mm (2.07 in) of rain being recorded in Miyake, Tokyo.

=== Tropical Storm Maliksi ===
- Tropical storm (JMA)
- Tropical depression (SSHWS)
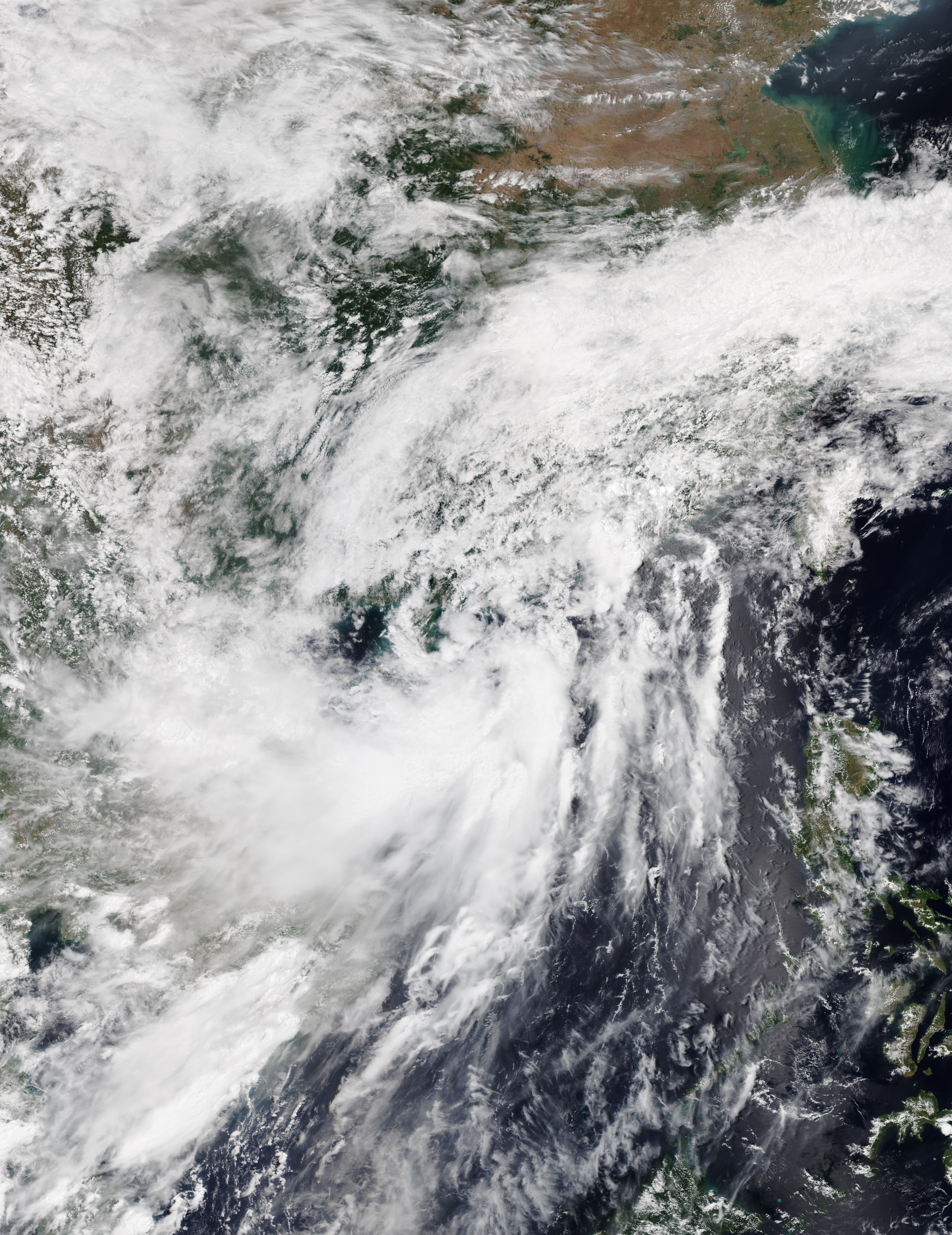
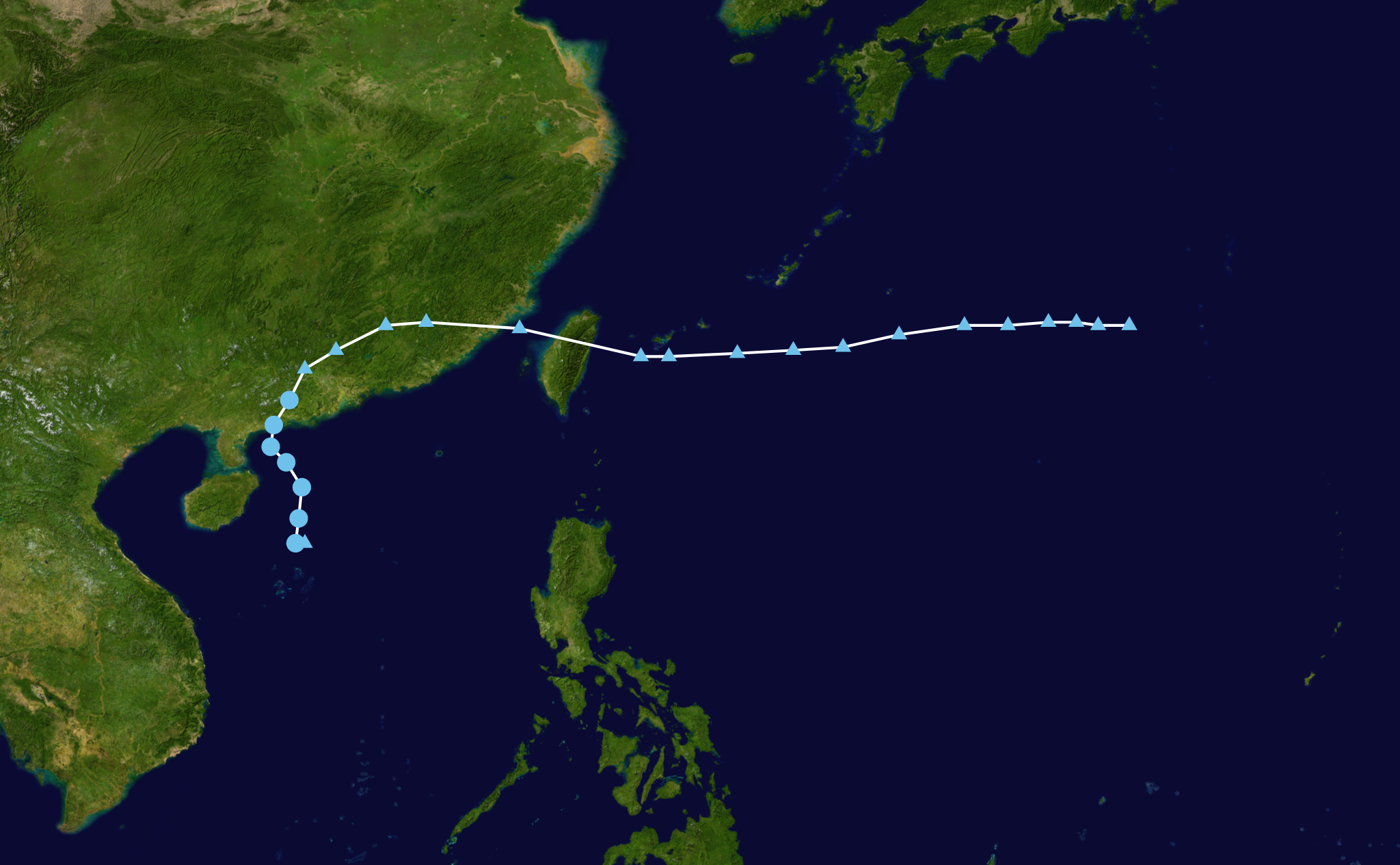
- Duration: May 30 – June 2
- Peak intensity: 65 km/h (40 mph) (10-min); 998 hPa (mbar)

On May 29, the JTWC began tracking an area of convection located 406 km (252 mi) southeast of Haikou, China. Being in an area of warm waters and low vertical shear and having southerly outflow, the system sustained a weak circulation, inhibited from development by another area of convection near Mainland China. It was recognized as a low-pressure area by the Japan Meteorological Agency (JMA) early the next day, before the agency upgraded it to a tropical depression at 06:00 UTC. Later that day, the JTWC issued a Tropical Cyclone Formation Alert (TCFA) on the depression since it had rapidly developed. At 00:00 UTC the next day, the JTWC upgraded the system into a tropical depression, designating it as 02W. Later, the JMA upgraded it into a tropical storm, and it was given the name Maliksi. However, the JTWC reported that it did not intensify into a tropical storm as it was disorganized, with the circulation elongating. At 21:00 UTC on May 31, the JTWC discontinued warnings on the system as it made landfall in Yangjiang, Guangdong. Soon after, the JMA last noted Maliksi as a depression on June 1 before weakening further into a low-pressure area the next day, as it tracked inland.

On May 30, the Hong Kong Observatory issued a No. 1 standby signal as the depression neared Hong Kong. The next day, it upgraded the warnings into a No. 3 Strong Wind signal. Although it was likely to not directly affect Taiwan, the Central Weather Administration noted that Maliksi's remnants were likely to merge with a frontal system and bring heavy rains to Taiwan over the weekend. In Macau, the storm caused unstable weather, with the Meteorological and Geophysical Bureau issuing Typhoon Signal No. 3. In China, torrential rainfall occurred, peaking at 272.3 mm (10.72 in) somewhere in the Leizhou Peninsula. Additionally, heavy rain was recorded in Fujian, Zhejiang and Jiangxi.

=== Tropical Depression 03W ===
- Tropical depression (JMA)
- Tropical depression (SSHWS)
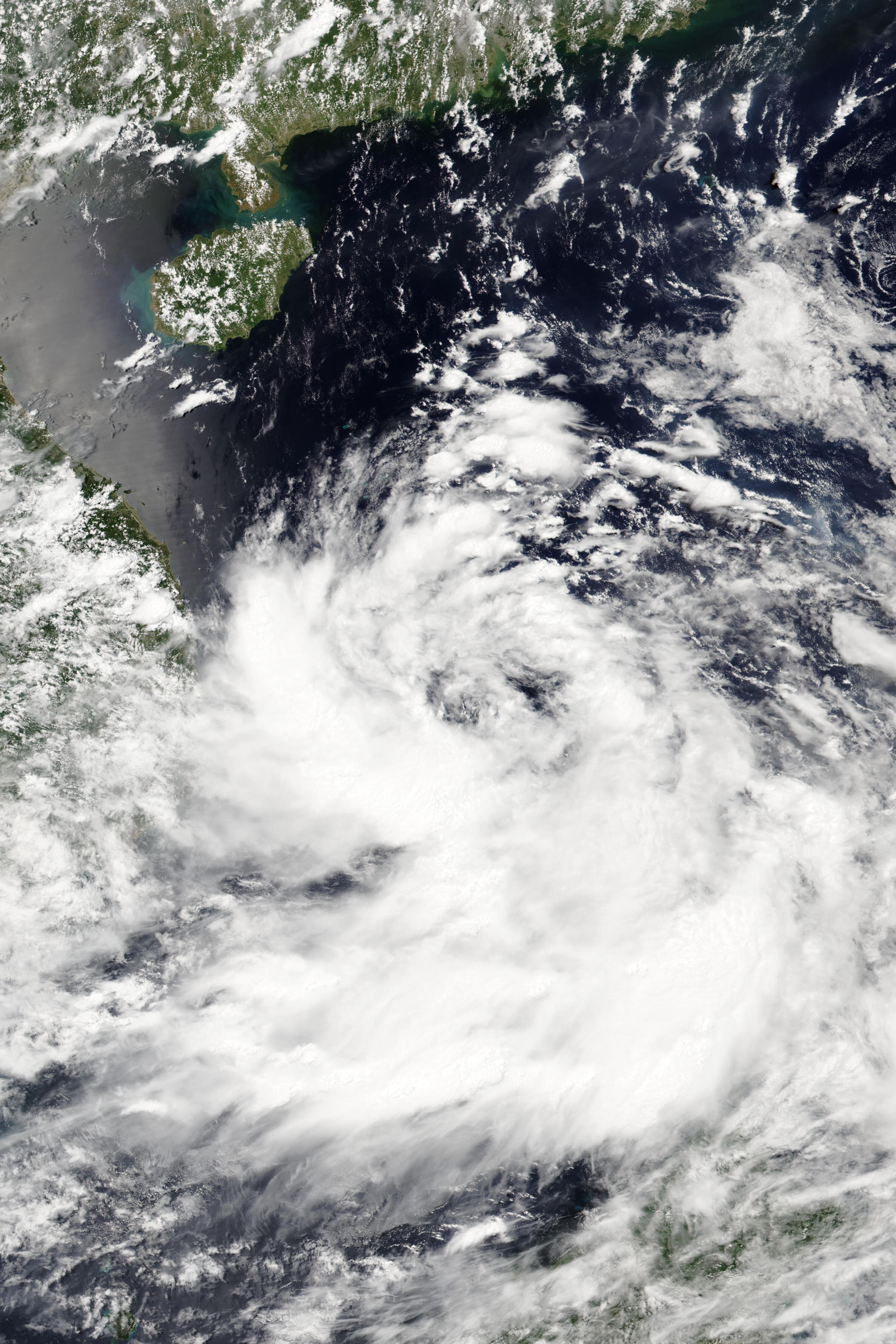
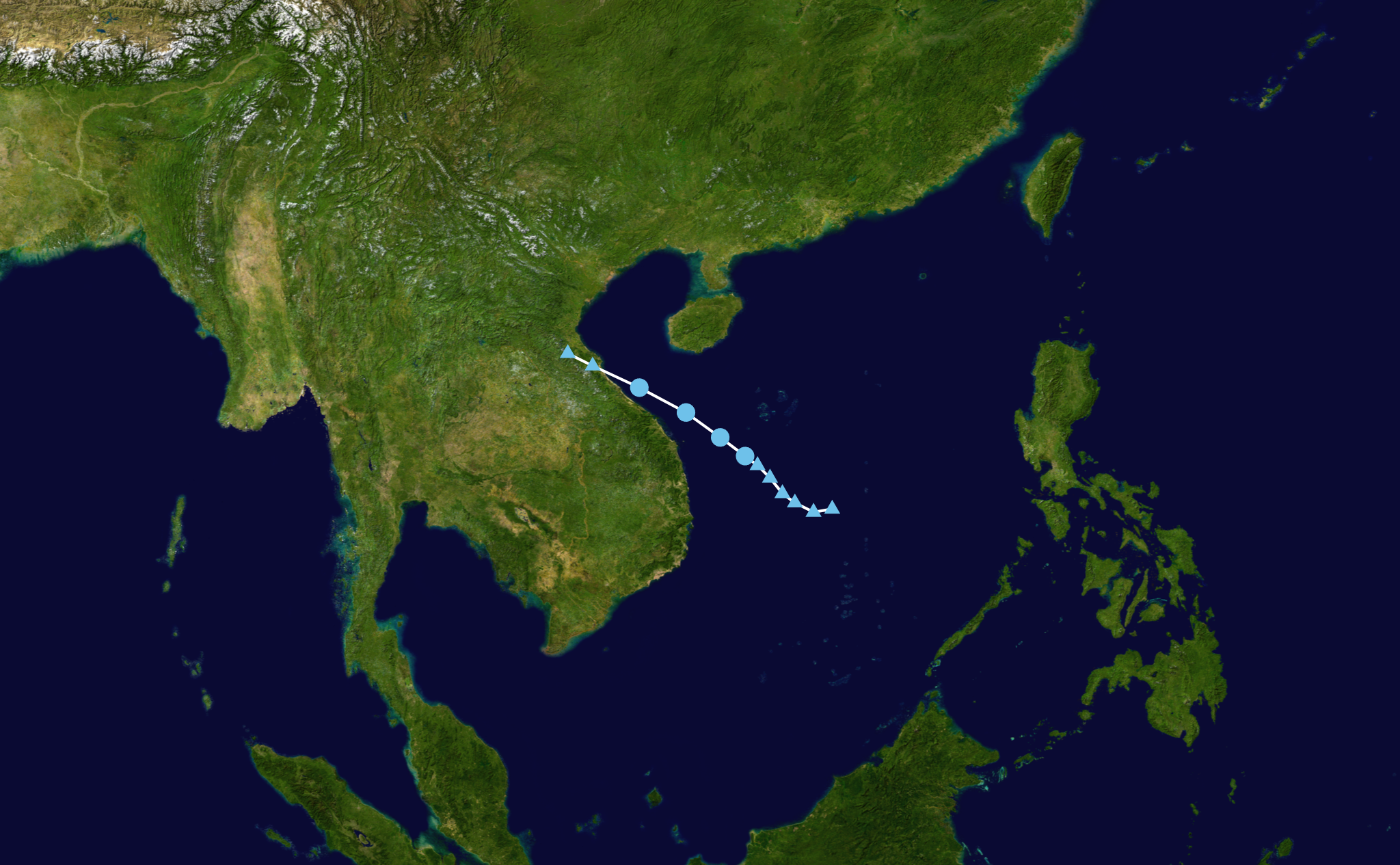
- Duration: July 13 – July 15
- Peak intensity: 55 km/h (35 mph) (10-min); 1000 hPa (mbar)

On July 13, the JTWC began tracking an area of convection 423 mi (682 km) east-southeast of Da Nang, Vietnam. At the time, the disturbance was in a marginal environment for development, with high vertical wind shear offsetting good divergence aloft alongside warm sea surface temperatures. At 06:00 UTC of that day, the JMA designated the system as a tropical depression. The JTWC then issued a TCFA on the system the next day, noting its symmetrical center had improved as it moves northwest, though convection was disorganized. By 18:00 UTC the next day, the JTWC upgraded the system into a tropical depression, designating it 03W. However, they issued their last warning on the depression early the next day as it moved over Vietnam and rapidly weakened. Later that day, the JMA stopped tracking the depression as it dissipated.

=== Typhoon Gaemi (Carina) ===
- Very strong typhoon (JMA)
- Category 4 typhoon (SSHWS)
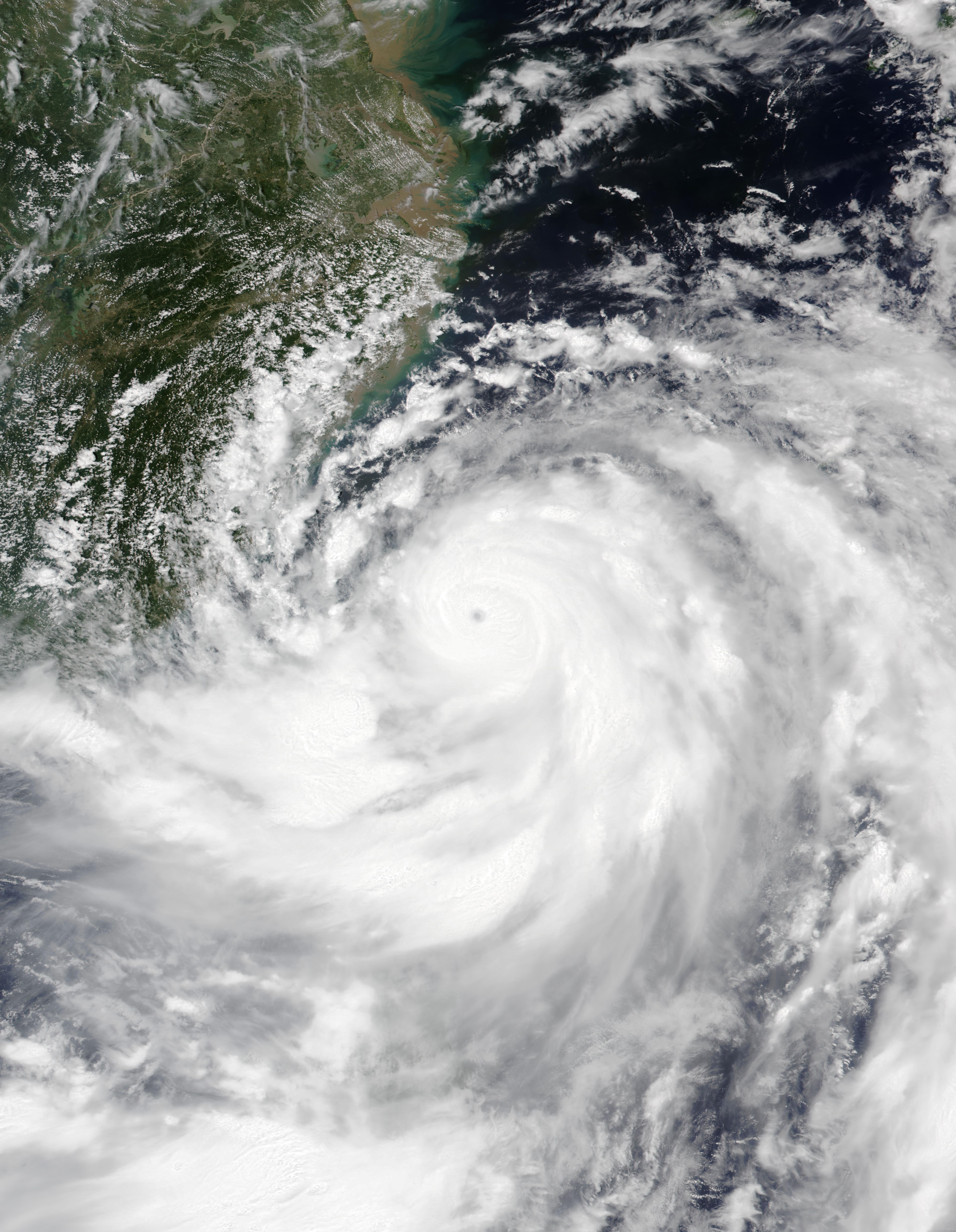
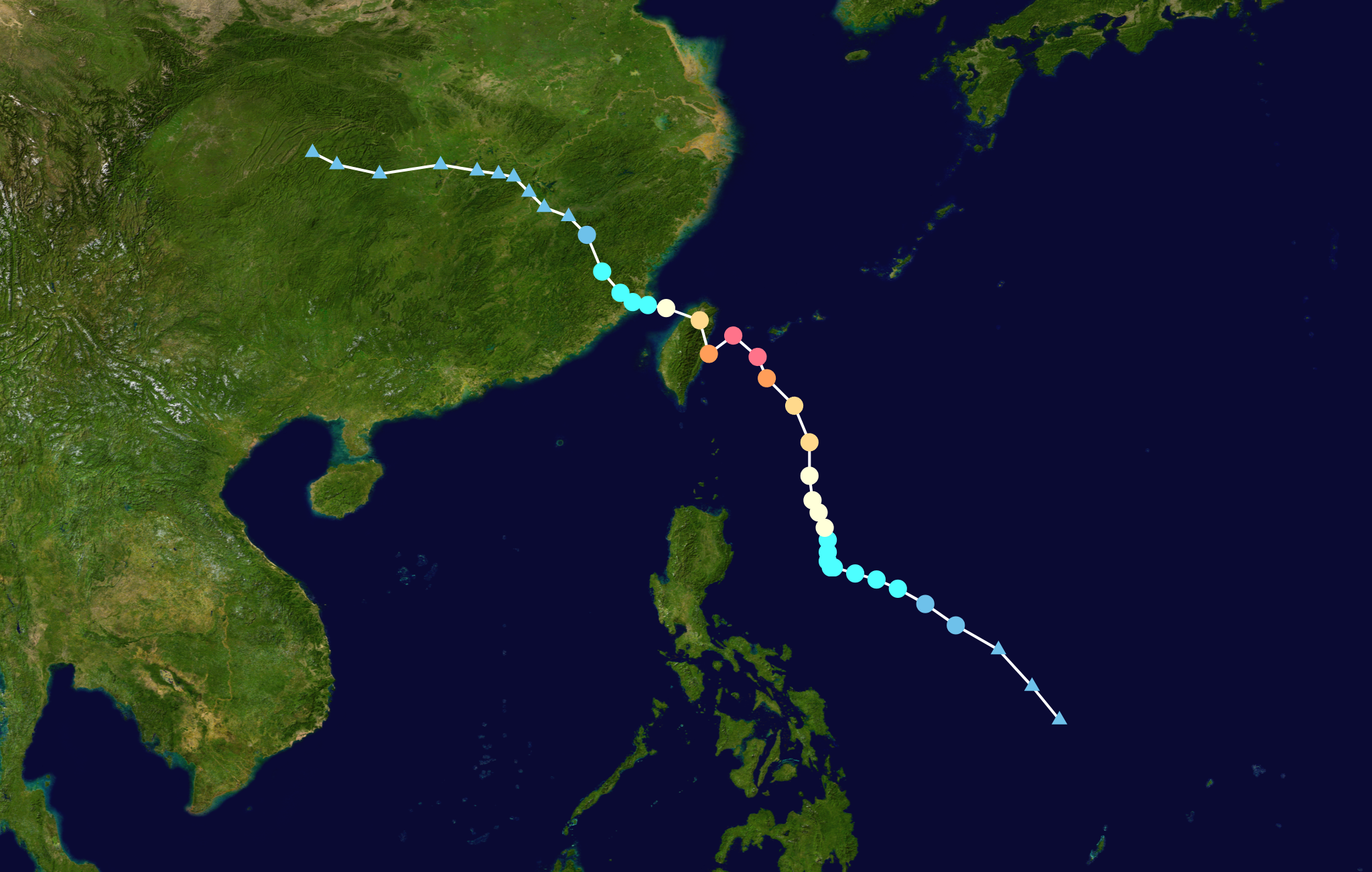
- Duration: July 19 – July 29
- Peak intensity: 165 km/h (105 mph) (10-min); 935 hPa (mbar)

On July 17, the JMA reported that a low-pressure area had formed east of Palau. Shortly after, both the JMA and the JTWC followed suit and upgraded the tropical depression, with the latter designating the system as 05W. The PAGASA followed suit a few hours later, recognizing the system as a tropical depression and naming it Carina. Early the next day, the depression intensified into a tropical storm, and was given the name Gaemi by the JMA. Due to a weak steering environment between the subtropical ridge to the northwest and east, the JTWC upgraded Gaemi to minimal typhoon around 21:00 UTC that day. On July 24, Gaemi later rapidly intensified and peaked at Category 4-equivalent intensity on the Saffir-Simpson scale at 21:00 UTC on 23 July, with 1-minute sustained winds of 230 km/h (145 mph) by the JTWC, 10-minute sustained winds of 165 km/h (105 mph) by the JMA, and a central pressure of 935 hPa (27.61 inHg). After stalling and executing a tight counter-clockwise loop near the coast, Gaemi slightly weakened into a below-equivalent typhoon status due to land interaction before it made landfall on the northeastern coast of Taiwan on July 24. Gaemi accelerated as it moved across the island and emerged into the Taiwan Strait just six hours after making landfall. Soon after, the JTWC ceased issuing advisories on the system as it made its final landfall at Xiuyu, Putian in Fujian Province. Once inland, the JMA downgraded Gaemi into a tropical depression on July 26 and continued tracking the system until it dissipated at 18:00 UTC of July 29.

The southwest monsoon, combined with Tropical Storm Prapiroon, brought heavy rains to southern and northern Luzon, triggering widespread flash floods that resulted in at least 126 deaths and caused damage estimated at US$2.31 billion across several countries.

=== Severe Tropical Storm Prapiroon (Butchoy) ===
- Severe tropical storm (JMA)
- Tropical storm (SSHWS)
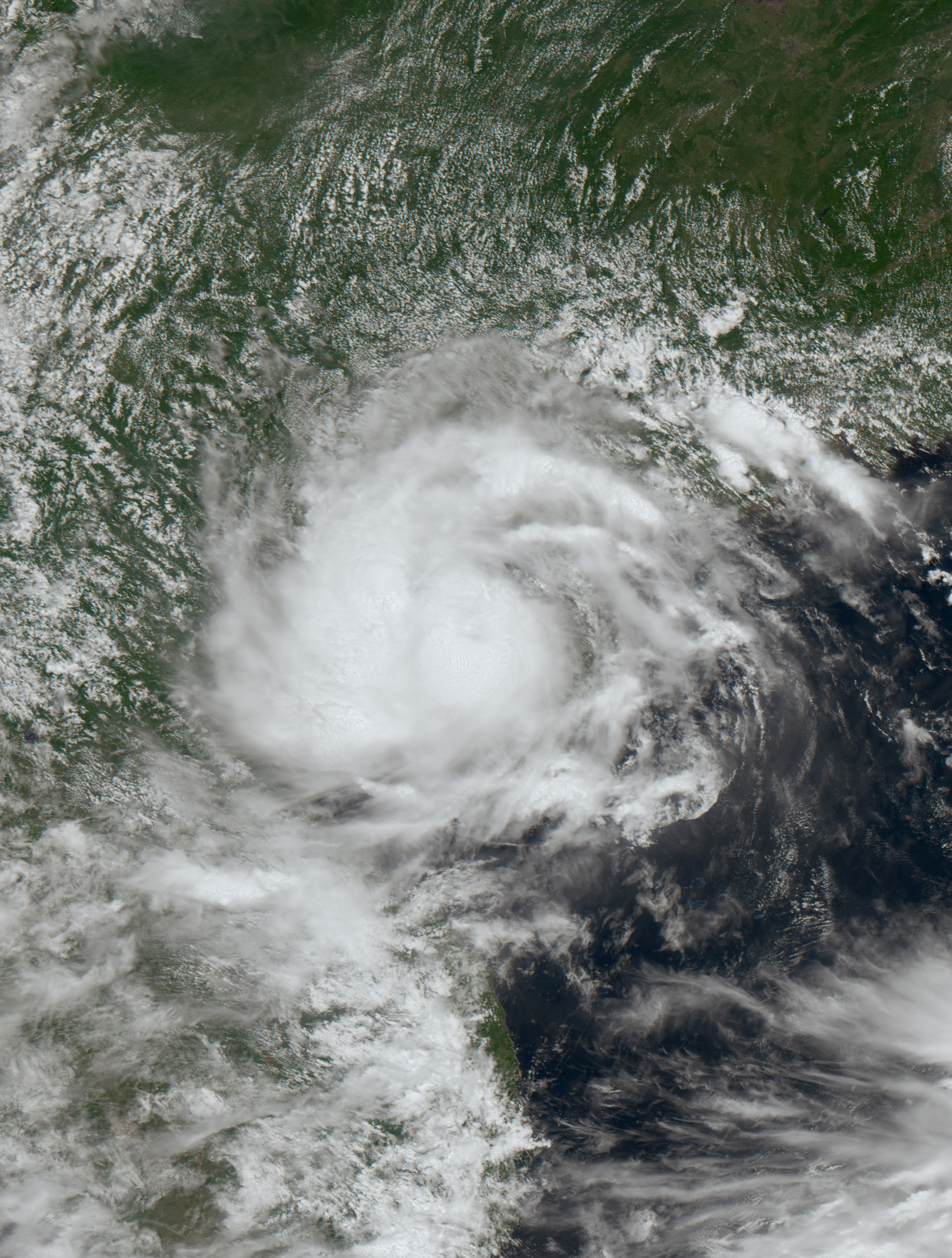
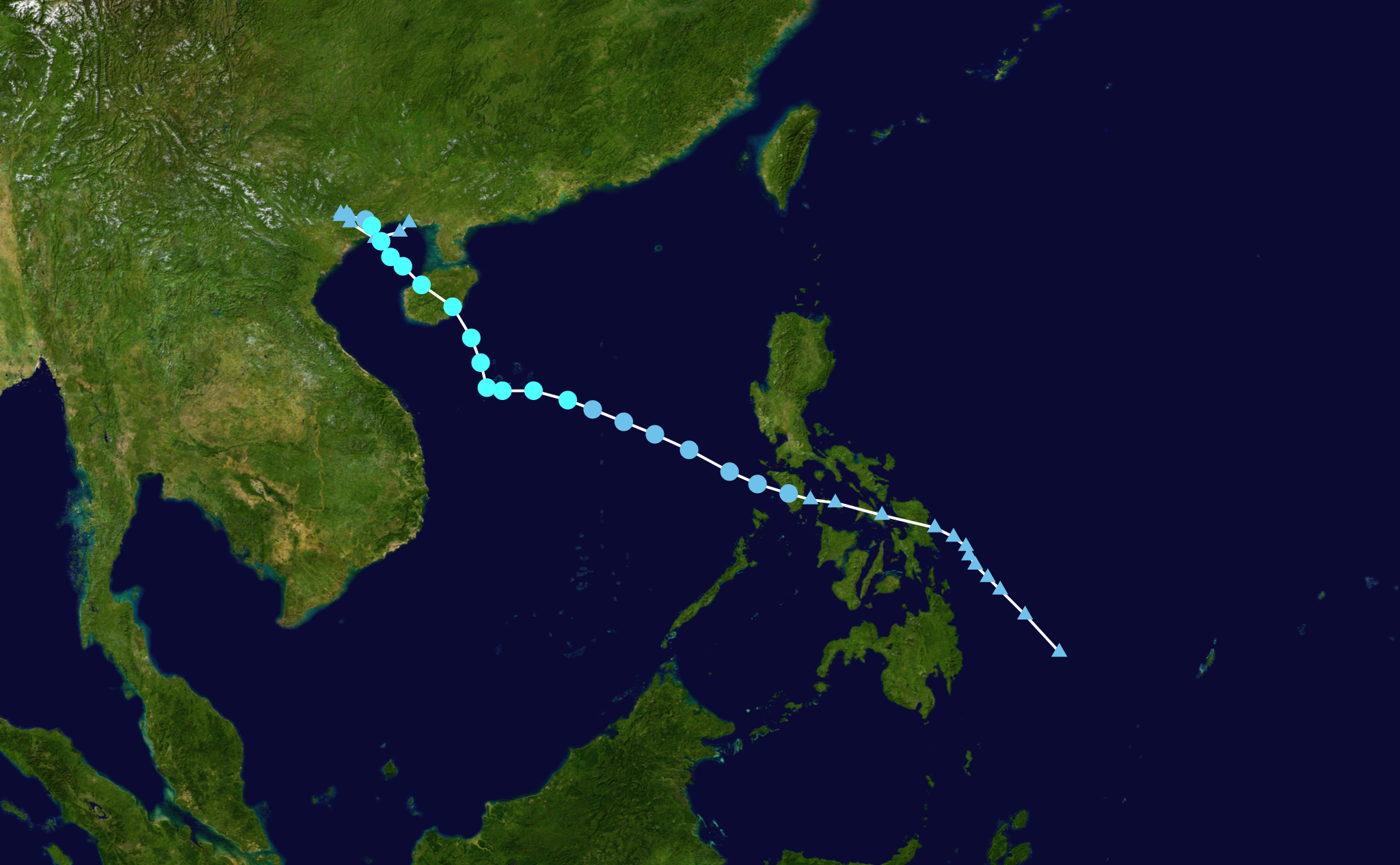
- Duration: July 20 – July 25
- Peak intensity: 100 km/h (65 mph) (10-min); 985 hPa (mbar)

On July 15, the JTWC started to monitor a persistent area of convection roughly 623 km (385 mi) southeast of Manila, Philippines. At that time, the disturbance was in a favorable environment for development, with warm 29–30 °C (84–86 °F), sea surface temperatures, low wind shear and good equatorial outflow. At 06:00 UTC the same day, the JMA designated the system as a low-pressure area. Shortly after, the JMA designated it as a tropical depression. The PAGASA declared the system a tropical depression a few hours later. Since the storm formed within the Philippine Area of Responsibility, the agency named it Butchoy. The JTWC began issuing advisories on the system, classifying it as 04W. It intensified into a tropical storm and was named Prapiroon by the JMA on July 21. The center of Prapiroon made landfall near Wanning, Hainan, with 1-minute sustained winds of 95 km/h (60 mph) on July 22. After making landfall, the storm maintained its well-defined eye while moving across central Hainan. Prapiroon soon encountered high wind shear and a dry environment, and by 06:30 ICT (21:30 UTC) on July 23, it made its second landfall in Quảng Ninh, Vietnam. After the system moved inland, both the JMA and the JTWC ceased monitoring it on July 24.

Typhoon Gaemi and Prapiroon, along with its precursor, significantly impacted the southwest monsoon over the Philippines, leading to heavy rainfall that caused 23 deaths, 9 people missing, and US$40.7 million in damages across several countries.

=== Severe Tropical Storm Maria ===
- Severe tropical storm (JMA)
- Category 1 typhoon (SSHWS)
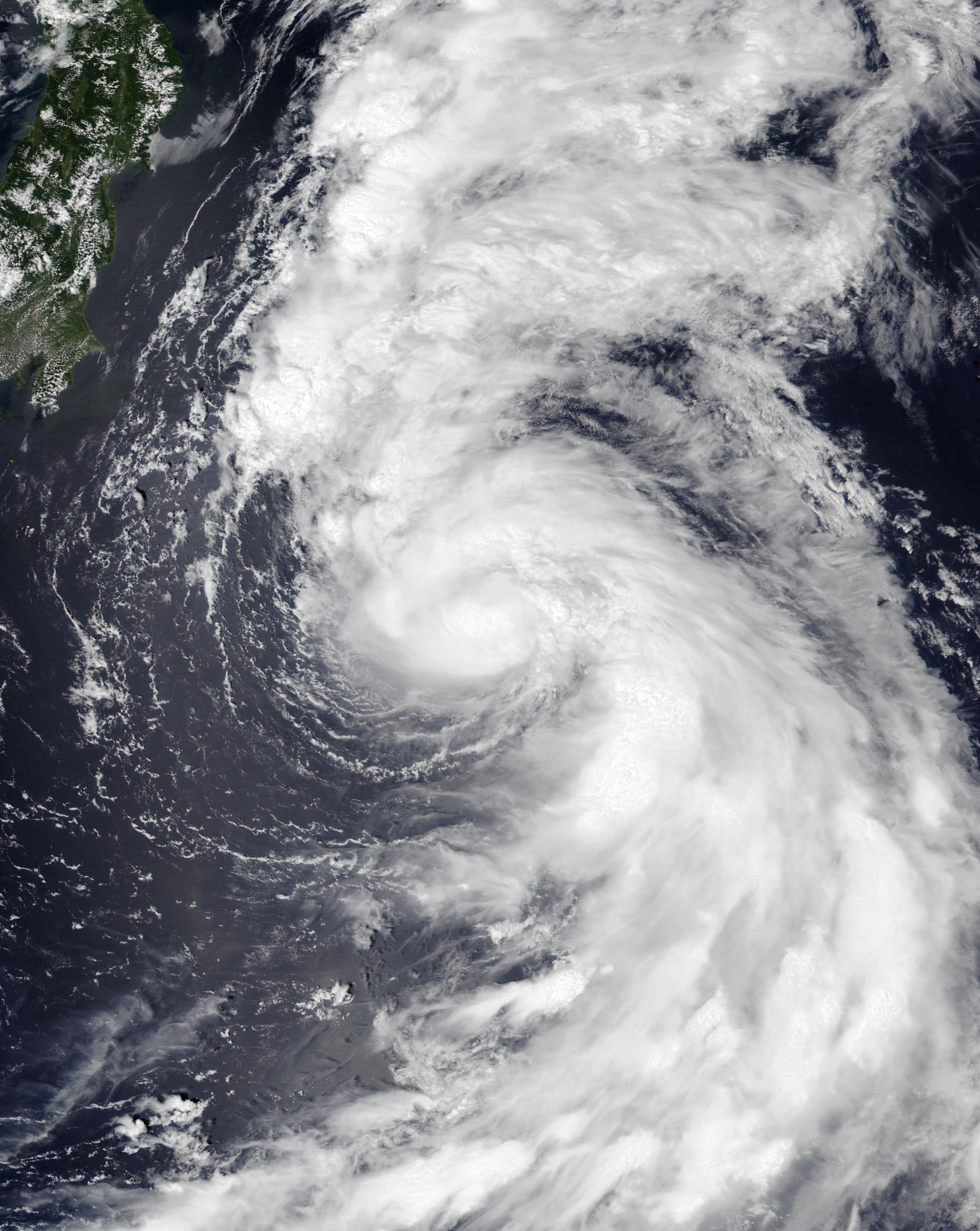
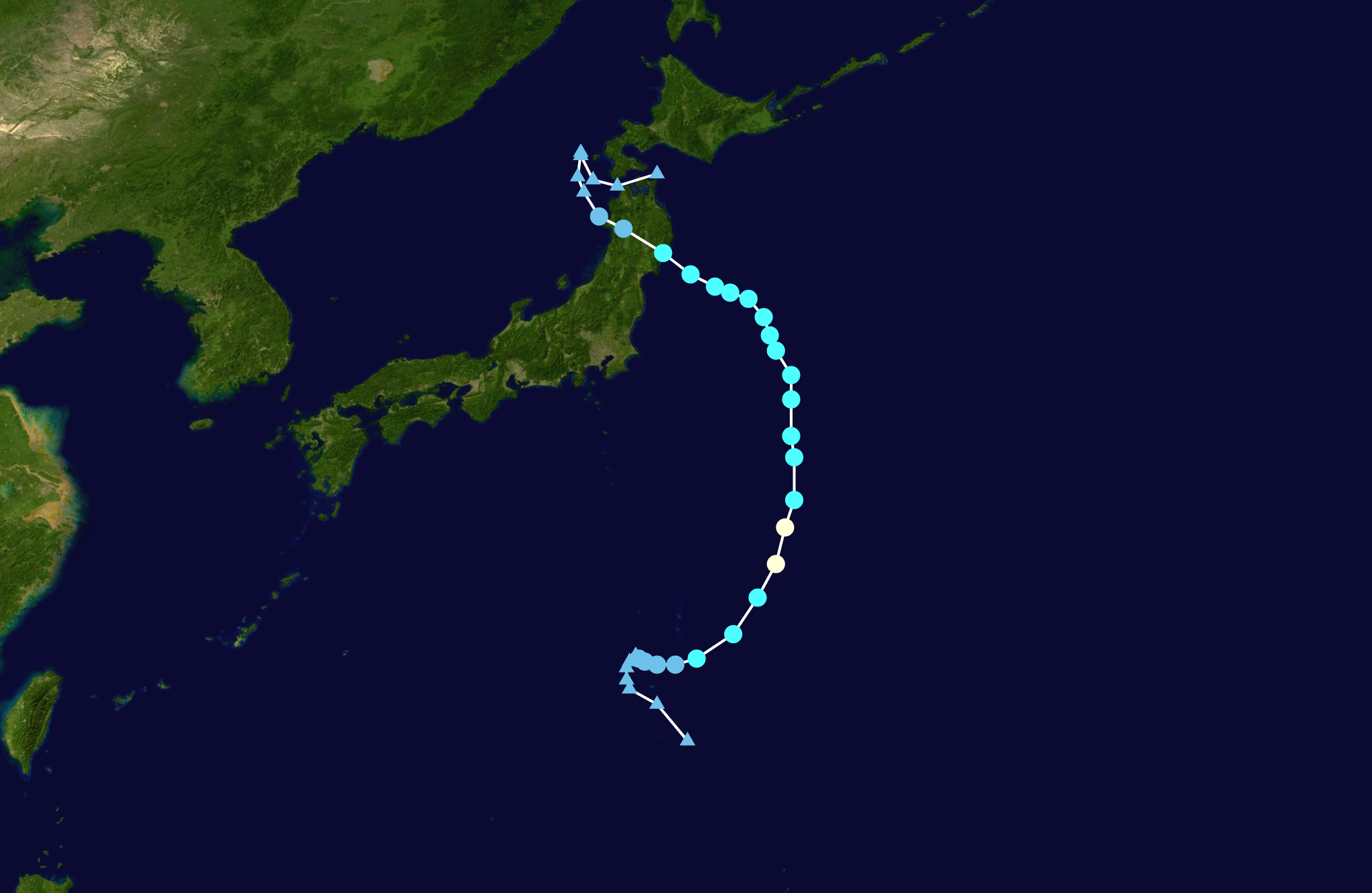
- Duration: August 5 – August 14
- Peak intensity: 100 km/h (65 mph) (10-min); 980 hPa (mbar)

On August 5, the JMA stated that a tropical depression had formed. Later that day, the JTWC began tracking it, noting the depression was in an environment with low to moderate wind shear, warm sea surface temperatures, and good equatorward outflow aloft. At 09:00 UTC on August 6, the JTWC issued a TCFA on the disturbance, which was located 423 mi (682 km) north-northwest of Iwo Jima, along the eastern periphery of the monsoon gyre, prior to it being designated as 06W. The development of a central dense overcast and a ragged eye feature signified its intensification into a tropical storm, leading the JMA to name it Maria on August 7. Maria then turned northeastward, and intensified into a severe tropical storm on August 8 due to a favorable environment for development. Concurrently, the JTWC then reported that Maria had rapidly intensified into a minimal typhoon due to strong equatorward and poleward outflow. However, Maria's wind field became more asymmetric, with its associated convection shifting northward, causing Maria to weaken into a tropical storm on August 9. Around 00:00 UTC on August 12, the storm made landfall Ōfunato, a city in Iwate Prefecture, Japan with winds of 85 km/h (50 mph) before traversing northern Honshu and emerging into the Sea of Japan. The JMA continued to monitor the system until it was last noted at 18:00 UTC on August 14.

Record-breaking rainfall in Iwate Prefecture, with 19 inches (482.6 mm) in Kuji and 12.6 inches (320.0 mm) in Otsuchi—nearly double the average for August—led to controlled releases from the Taki Dam in Kuji, necessitating the evacuation of 8,300 people and the issuance of the highest evacuation alert level, though no damage or injuries were reported in association with Maria.

=== Tropical Storm Son-Tinh ===
- Tropical storm (JMA)
- Tropical storm (SSHWS)
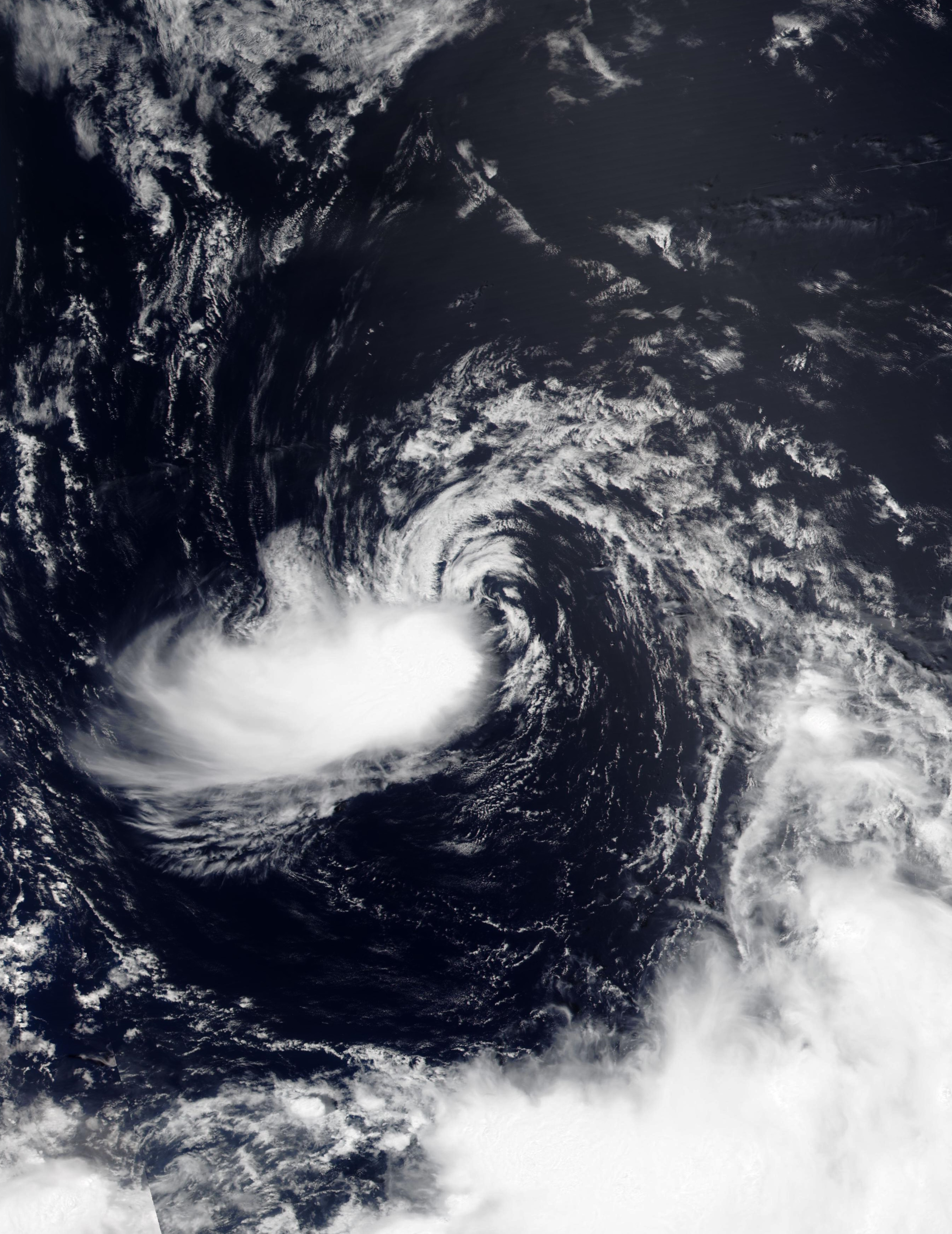
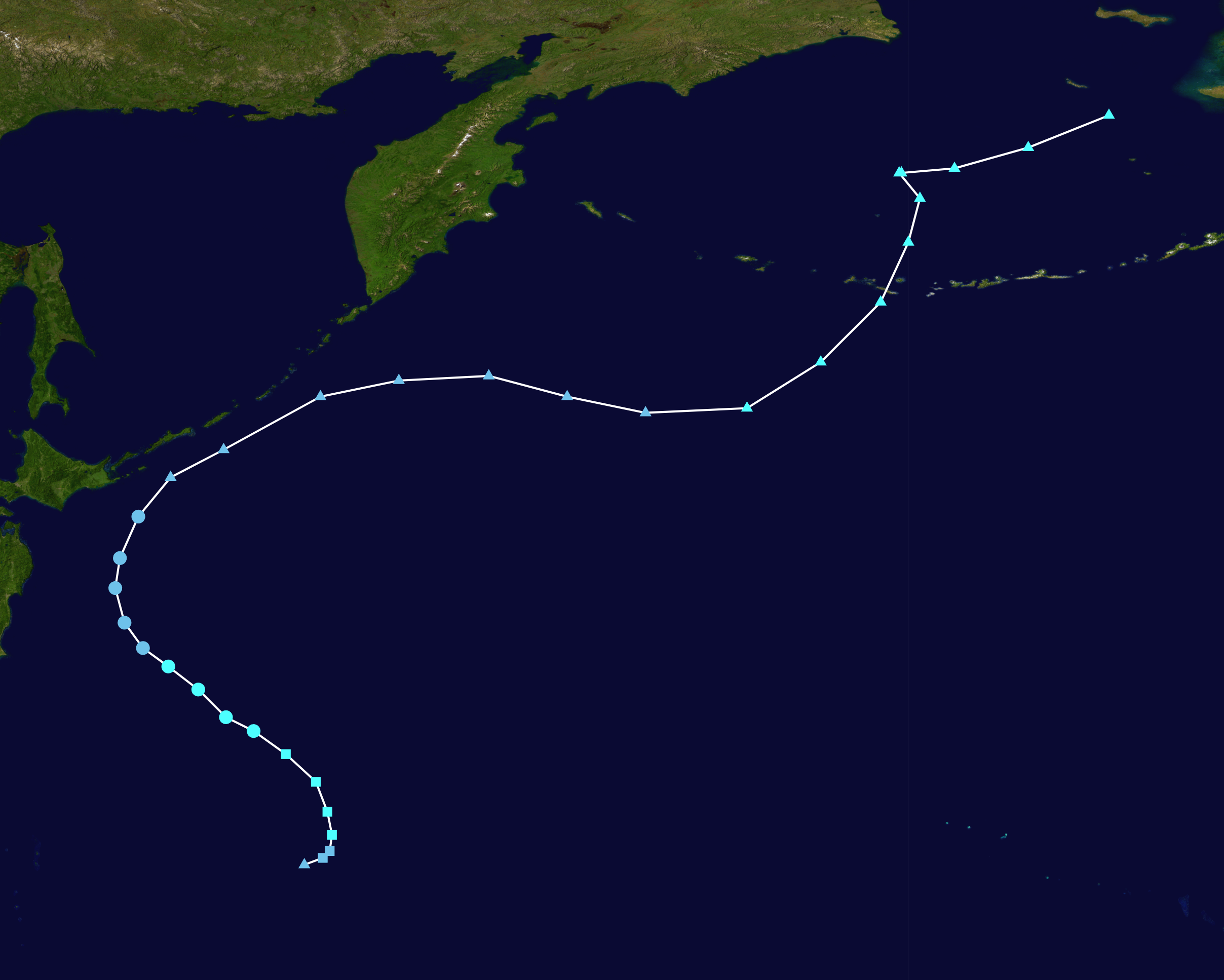
- Duration: August 10 – August 14
- Peak intensity: 75 km/h (45 mph) (10-min); 994 hPa (mbar)

On August 10, the JMA noted that a tropical depression had formed southeast of Severe Tropical Storm Maria. A few hours later, the JTWC began tracking the system, noting that it could transition into a tropical cyclone despite intense wind shear. Early the next day, they noted that the depression had transitioned into a subtropical cyclone. As a result, a few hours later, the JMA named it Son-Tinh. The next day, the JTWC noted that it had transitioned into a tropical storm, designating it 07W. Soon after, the low-level circulation center became fully exposed with no deep convection existing near the center. On August 13, Son-Tinh turned northwest along the western edge of a subtropical ridge. Both the JMA and the JTWC stopped monitoring it as a tropical depression that day, though the JMA continued to track it until it was last noted the following day.

=== Typhoon Ampil ===
- Very strong typhoon (JMA)
- Category 3 typhoon (SSHWS)
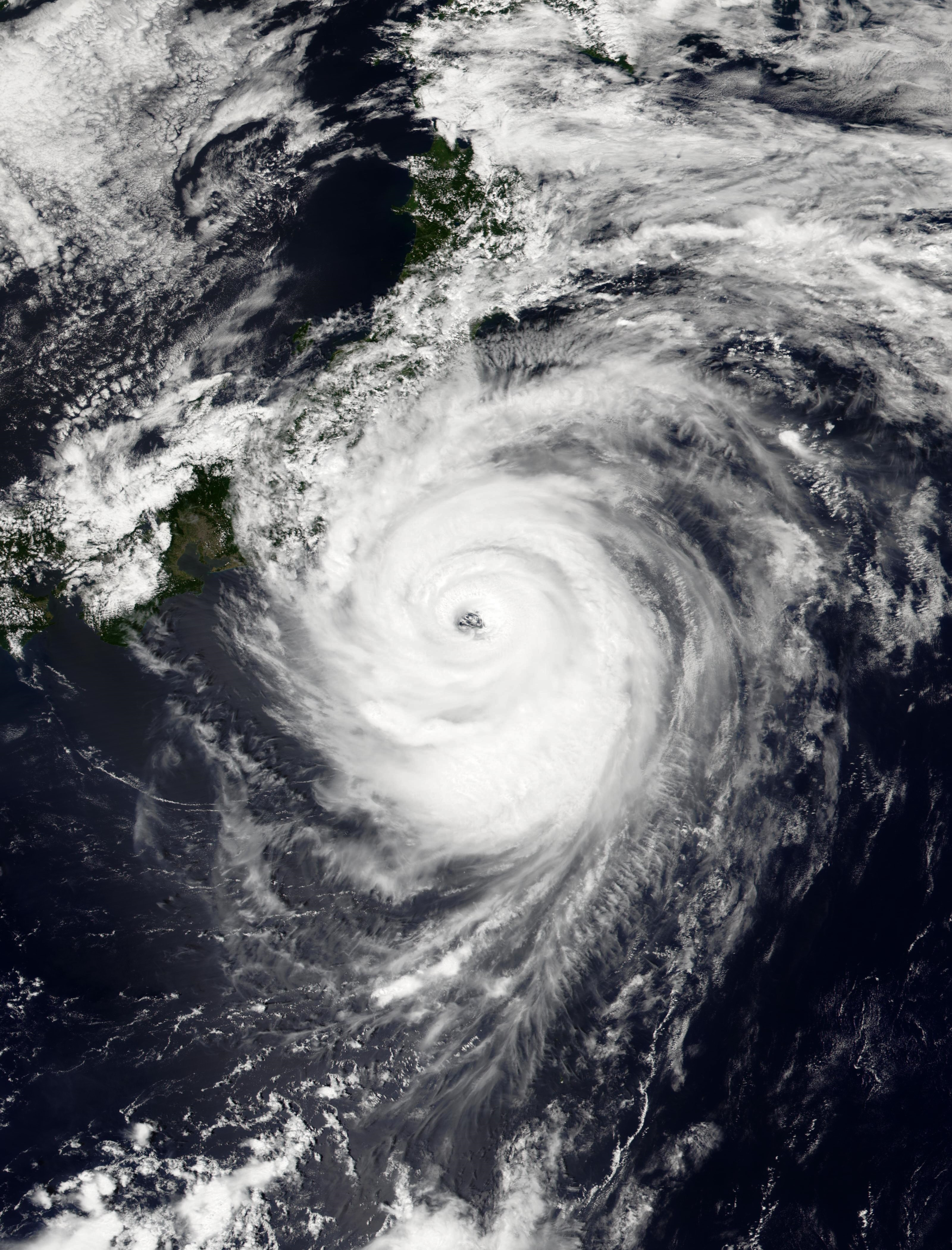
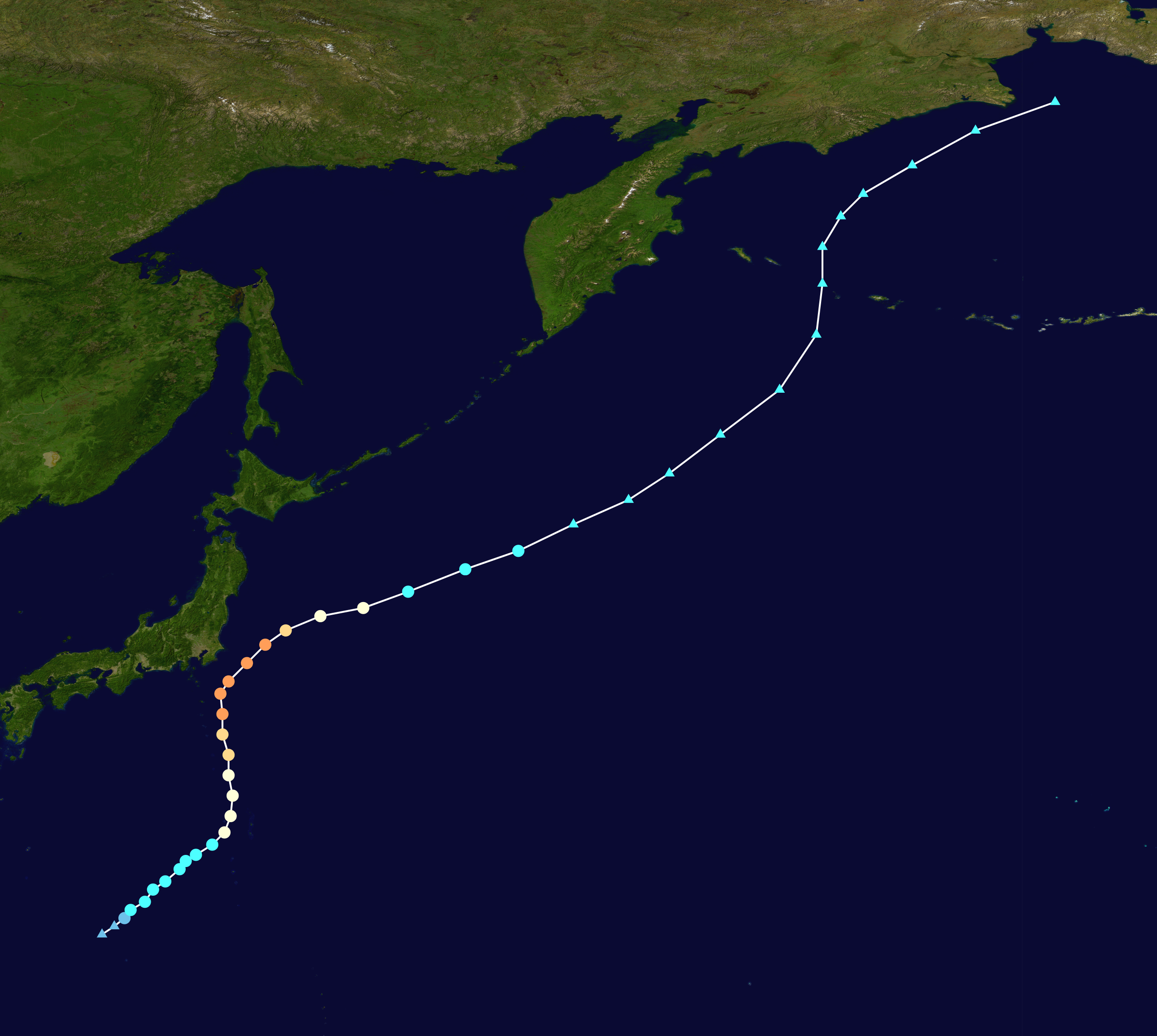
- Duration: August 11 – August 19
- Peak intensity: 155 km/h (100 mph) (10-min); 950 hPa (mbar)

On August 3, the JTWC began tracking an area of convection 976 km (606 mi) east of Kadena Air Base on August 3. At 18:00 UTC the same day, the JMA designated the system as a low-pressure area. However, the following day, the system was upgraded to a tropical depression. The depression weakened and was last noted by the JMA on August 7. The disturbance later meandered south of the Ryukyu Islands for a few days before it was re-designated by the JMA as a tropical depression on August 11. A few hours later, they recognized the system as a tropical depression, designating it as 08W. Soon after, the JMA noted that it had intensified into a tropical storm and named it Ampil. The JMA then reported that Ampil had intensified into a typhoon due to warm sea surface temperatures and low vertical wind shear on August 15. The JMA reported that Ampil reached its peak intensity at 12:00 UTC that day with 10-minute sustained winds of 155 km/h (100 mph) and a central pressure of 950 hPa (28.05 inHg) before making its closest approach to Japan, and transitioned into an extratropical low on August 19.

Ampil brought strong winds and coastal waves to western Alaska, while Tokyo experienced minimal damage according to NHK, although Kanagawa Prefecture saw several injuries; the remnants of Ampil also contributed to an atmospheric river as its moist core flowed into a low-pressure system, ultimately being absorbed into the Pacific jet stream and anticipated to impact California.

=== Tropical Storm Wukong ===
- Tropical storm (JMA)
- Tropical depression (SSHWS)
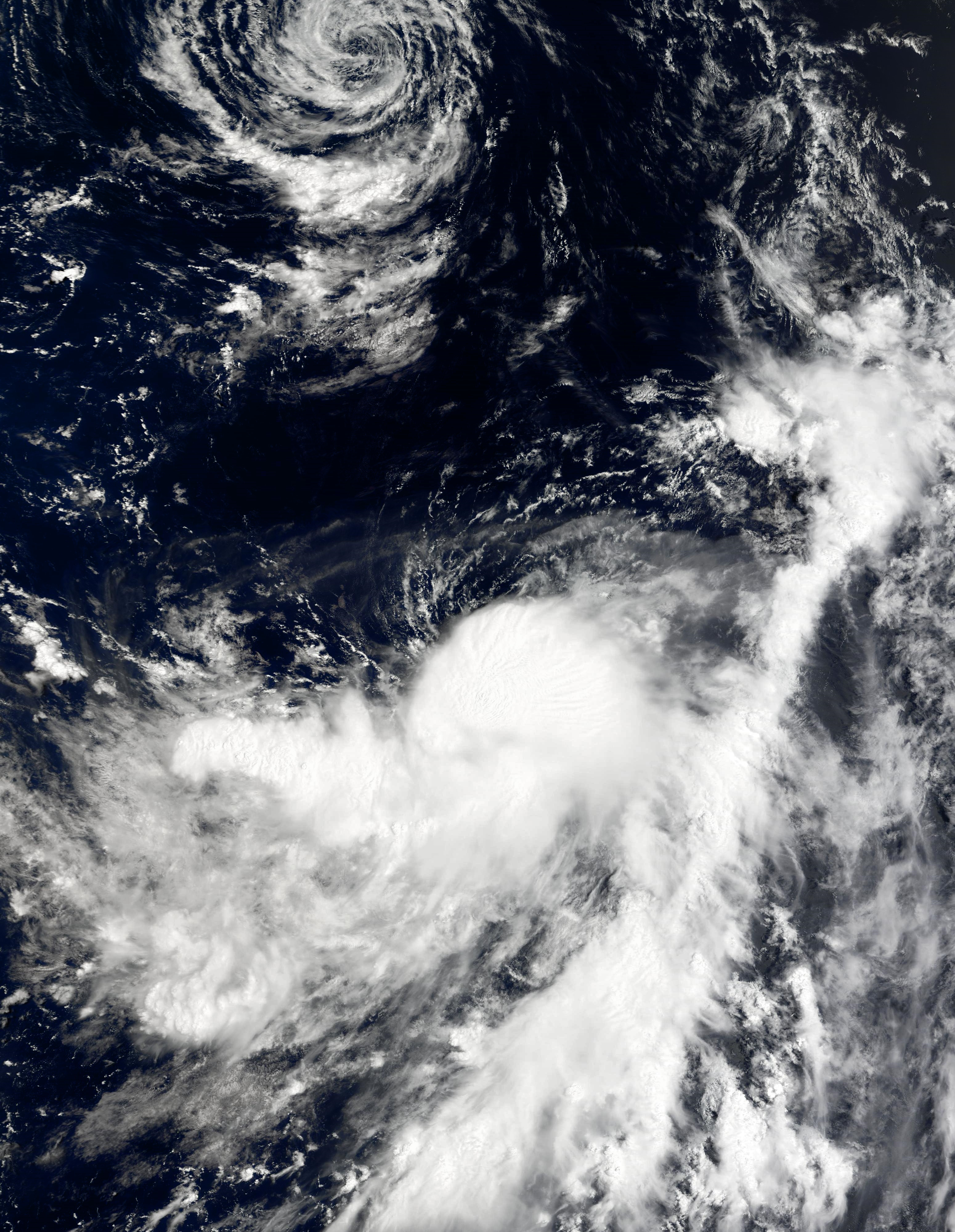
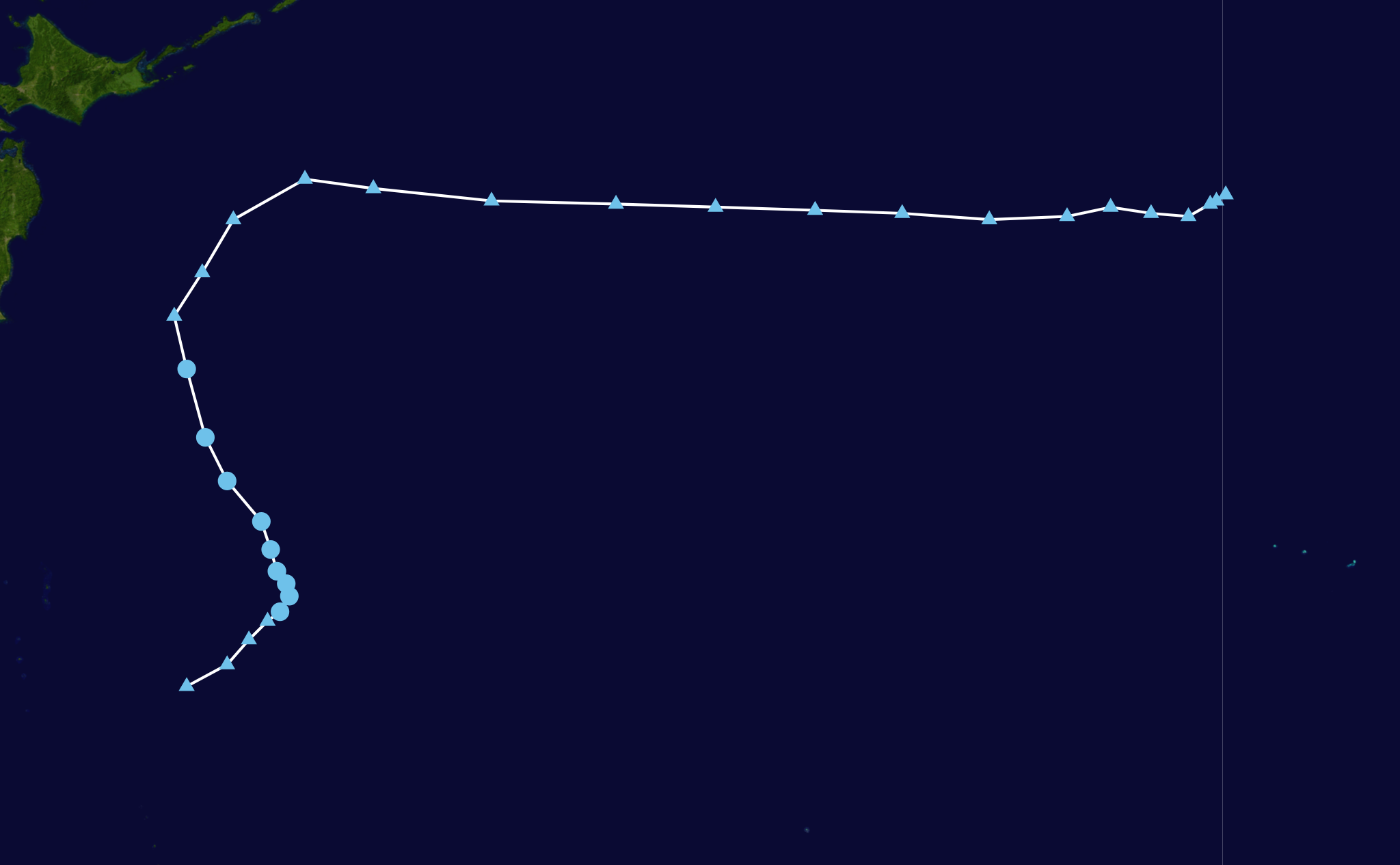
- Duration: August 11 – August 16
- Peak intensity: 65 km/h (40 mph) (10-min); 1002 hPa (mbar)

On 12 August, the JMA noted that a tropical depression formed southwest of Tropical Storm Son-Tinh. A few hours later, strong convection south of the system's low-level circulation center consolidated, which prompted the JTWC to issue a TCFA for the disturbance. Soon after, they recognized the system as a tropical depression, designating it as 09W. Satellite imagery revealed that a central dense overcast obscured the center, leading to the depression strengthening into a tropical storm named Wukong by the JMA, although moderate vertical wind shear displaced the deep convection to the southeast. Wukong then shifted northwestward, following the eastern edge of a subtropical ridge, while also being affected by the shear and outflow from Typhoon Ampil to the southwest. On August 15, both the JMA and the JTWC ceased monitoring the system, with the JMA reporting that Wukong had transitioned into an extratropical low due to moderate vertical wind shear and cooler sea surface temperatures.

=== Tropical Storm Jongdari (Dindo) ===
- Tropical storm (JMA)
- Tropical storm (SSHWS)
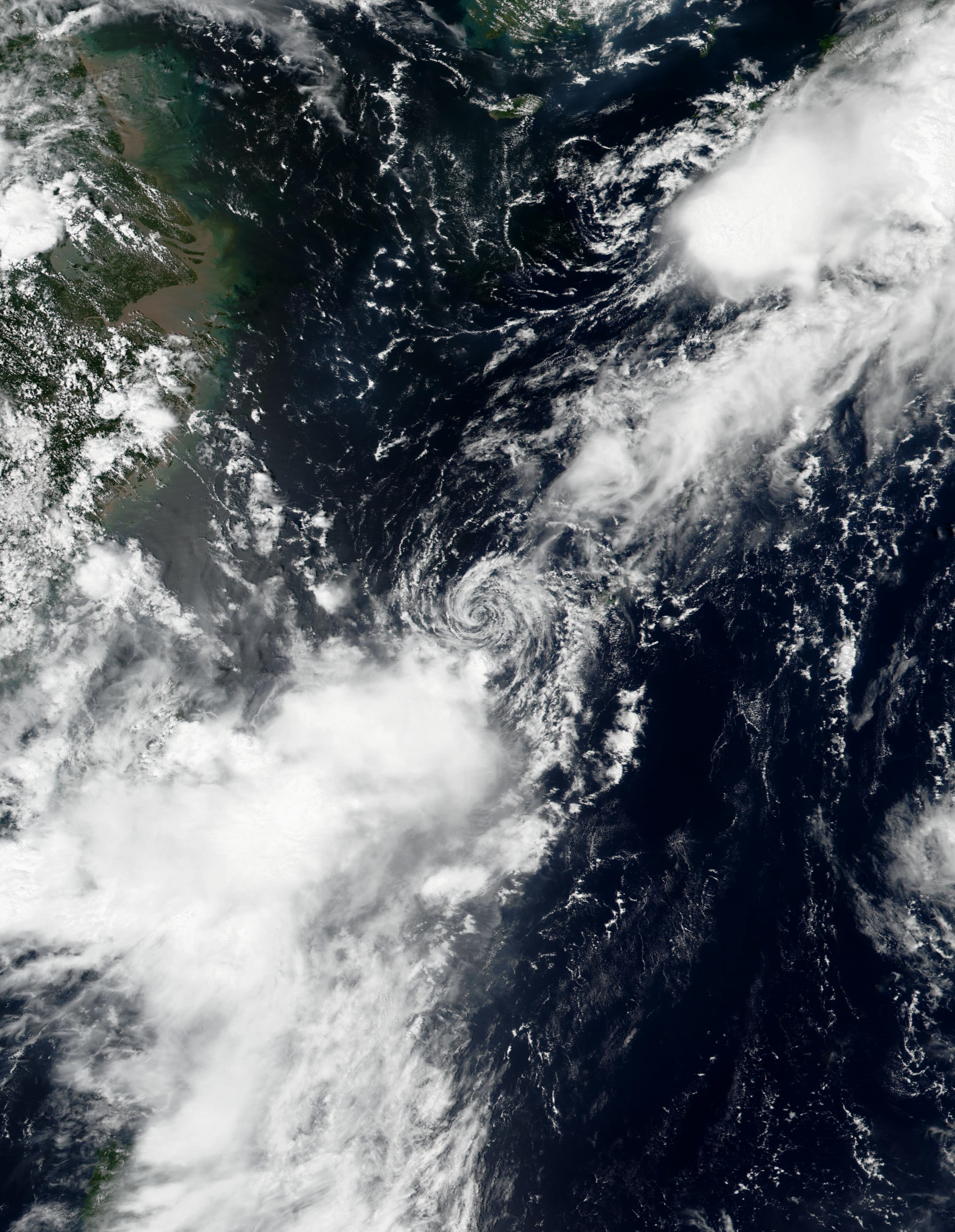
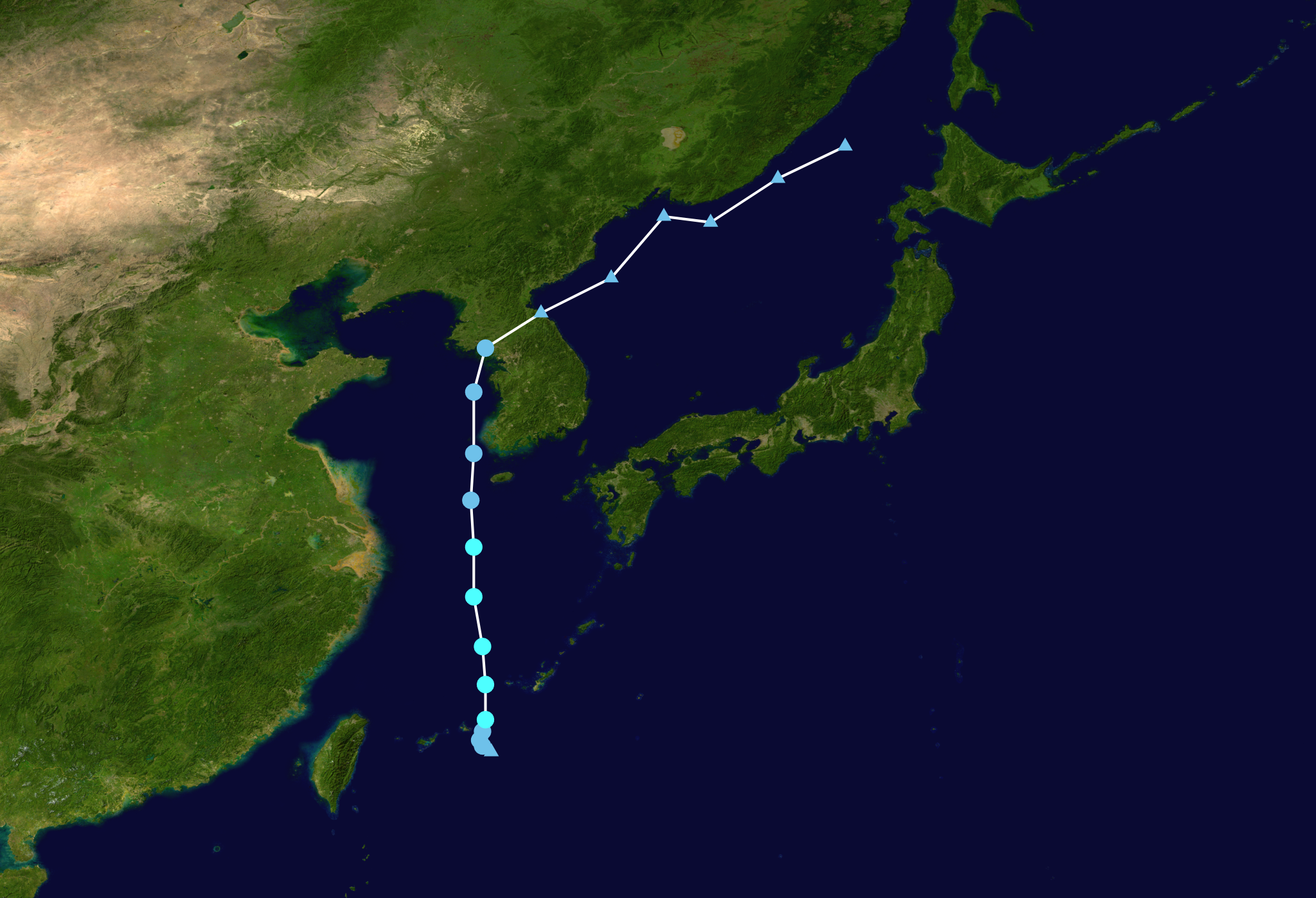
- Duration: August 18 – August 22
- Peak intensity: 75 km/h (45 mph) (10-min); 996 hPa (mbar)

On August 17, a low-pressure area east of Taiwan developed into a tropical depression. The JTWC soon issued a TCFA after the system developed a low-level circulation center and deep convection. PAGASA later named the system Dindo, while the JMA upgraded it to Tropical Storm Jongdari. The JTWC designated it as Tropical Depression 10W the next day. As Jongdari moved north-northeastward along the western edge of a subtropical ridge, its convection became displaced from the exposed low-level circulation center. The storm weakened over the Yellow Sea, made landfall over the Korean Demilitarized Zone on August 20, and later emerged into the Sea of Japan. The JTWC declared the system dissipated later that day, while the JMA continued monitoring it until August 21.

In southern Jeju, Jongdari dropped 60–130 millimetres (2.4–5.1 in) of rain as it approached the coast. One person, a 60-year-old crew member of a 43-ton fishing boat, drowned in a port on Heuksando, Sinan County, where the vessel had sought shelter from the storm. Its remnants also brought heavy rain and flooding to Liaoning, China, leaving 27 people dead or missing and causing 15.47 billion yuan (US$2.15 billion) in damage.

=== Typhoon Shanshan ===
- Very strong typhoon (JMA)
- Category 4 typhoon (SSHWS)
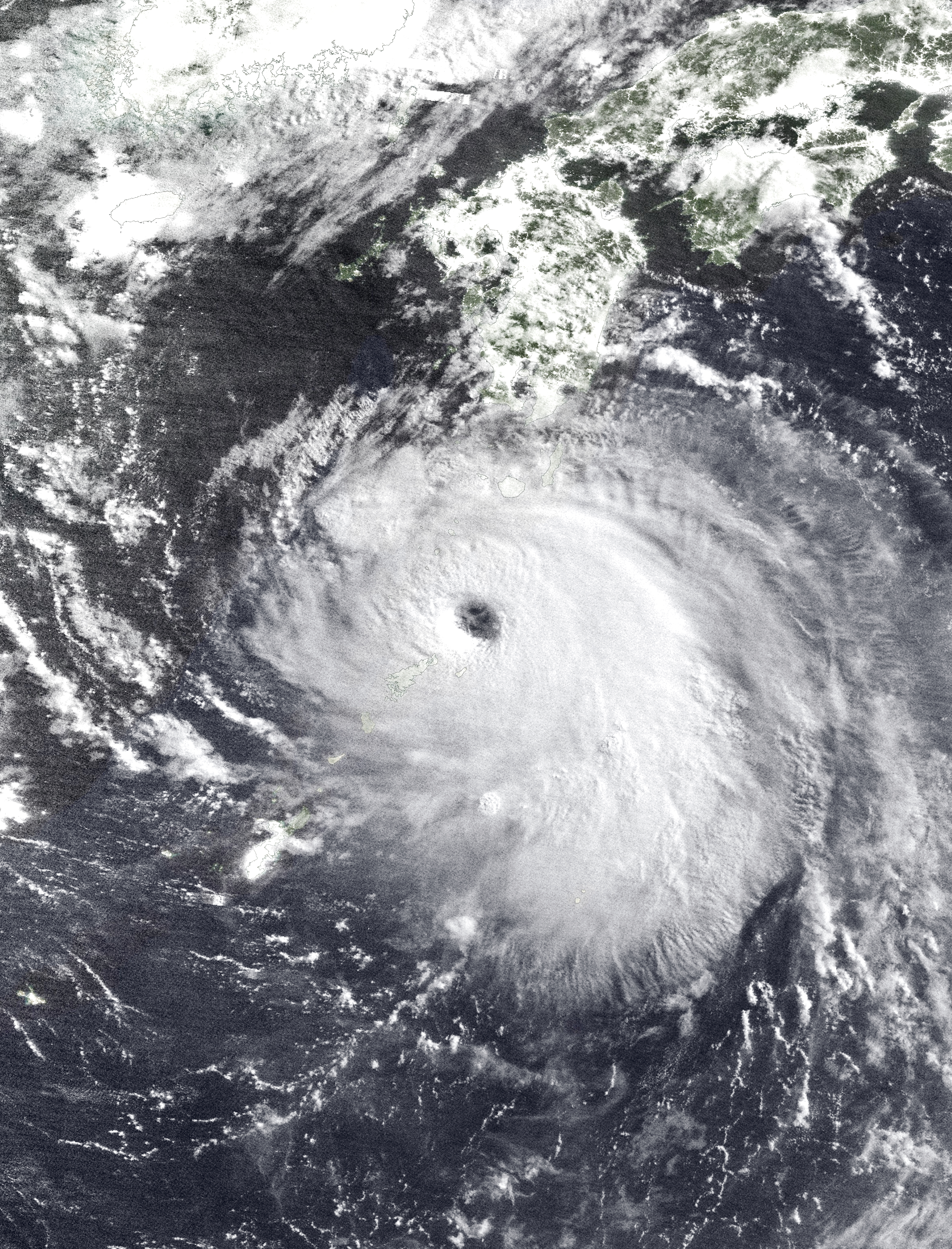
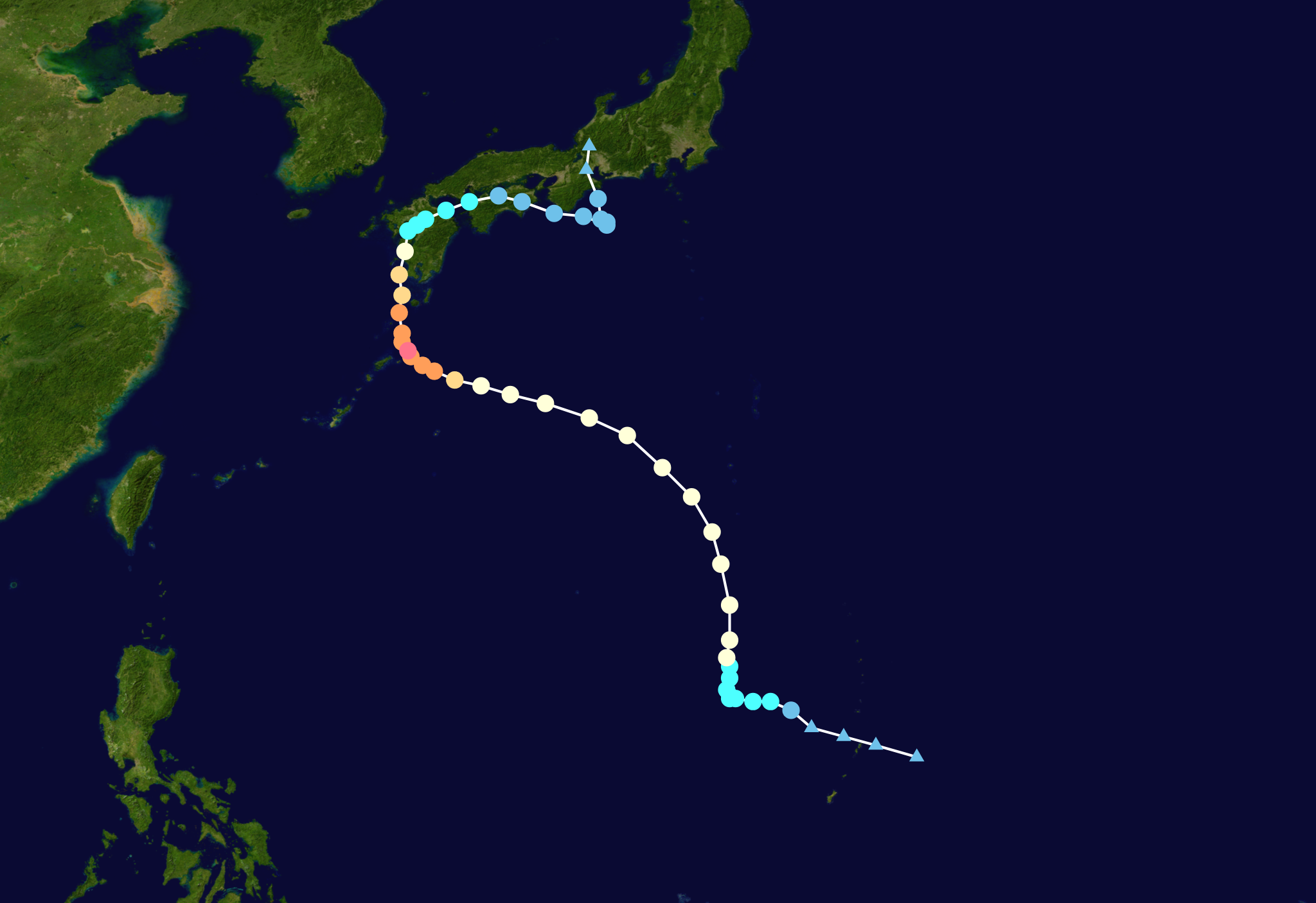
- Duration: August 20 – September 1
- Peak intensity: 175 km/h (110 mph) (10-min); 935 hPa (mbar)

On August 20, the JMA reported that a low-pressure area had formed near the Mariana Islands. At midnight on August 21, both the JMA and the JTWC upgraded the tropical depression, with the latter designating the system as 11W. Shortly after, the depression intensified into a tropical storm and was named Shanshan by the JMA due to low vertical wind shear and warm sea surface temperatures. A ragged eye-like feature appeared on satellite imagery, and on August 24, both the JMA and the JTWC upgraded it to a minimal typhoon. The JMA reported that Shanshan reached its peak intensity at 15:00 UTC on August 27, with 10-minute sustained winds of 175 km/h (110 mph) and a central pressure of 935 hPa (27.61 inHg). Shanshan then turned northward and made landfall near Satsumasendai in Kagoshima Prefecture on August 29. It then turned eastward along the northern periphery of a subtropical high, quickly crossed the Seto Inland Sea, and made landfall over Ehime Prefecture in northern Shikoku on August 30. Shanshan's circulation later diminished as its LLCC became disorganized. However, convection slightly increased after six hours as Shanshan's circulation moved back over open water and began moving east-southeastward, causing to regenerate back to a depression. The JMA continued to monitor the system until it dissipated at 18:00 UTC that day.

The JMA issued special weather warnings for Kagoshima Prefecture, marking the first such emergency alert since Typhoon Nanmadol in 2022. Shanshan caused six fatalities and damaged hundreds of structures throughout Japan. In response to the severe weather, evacuation orders were issued for 996,299 people in Miyazaki Prefecture and 982,273 people in Kagoshima Prefecture.

=== Typhoon Yagi (Enteng) ===
- Violent typhoon (JMA)
- Category 5 super typhoon (SSHWS)
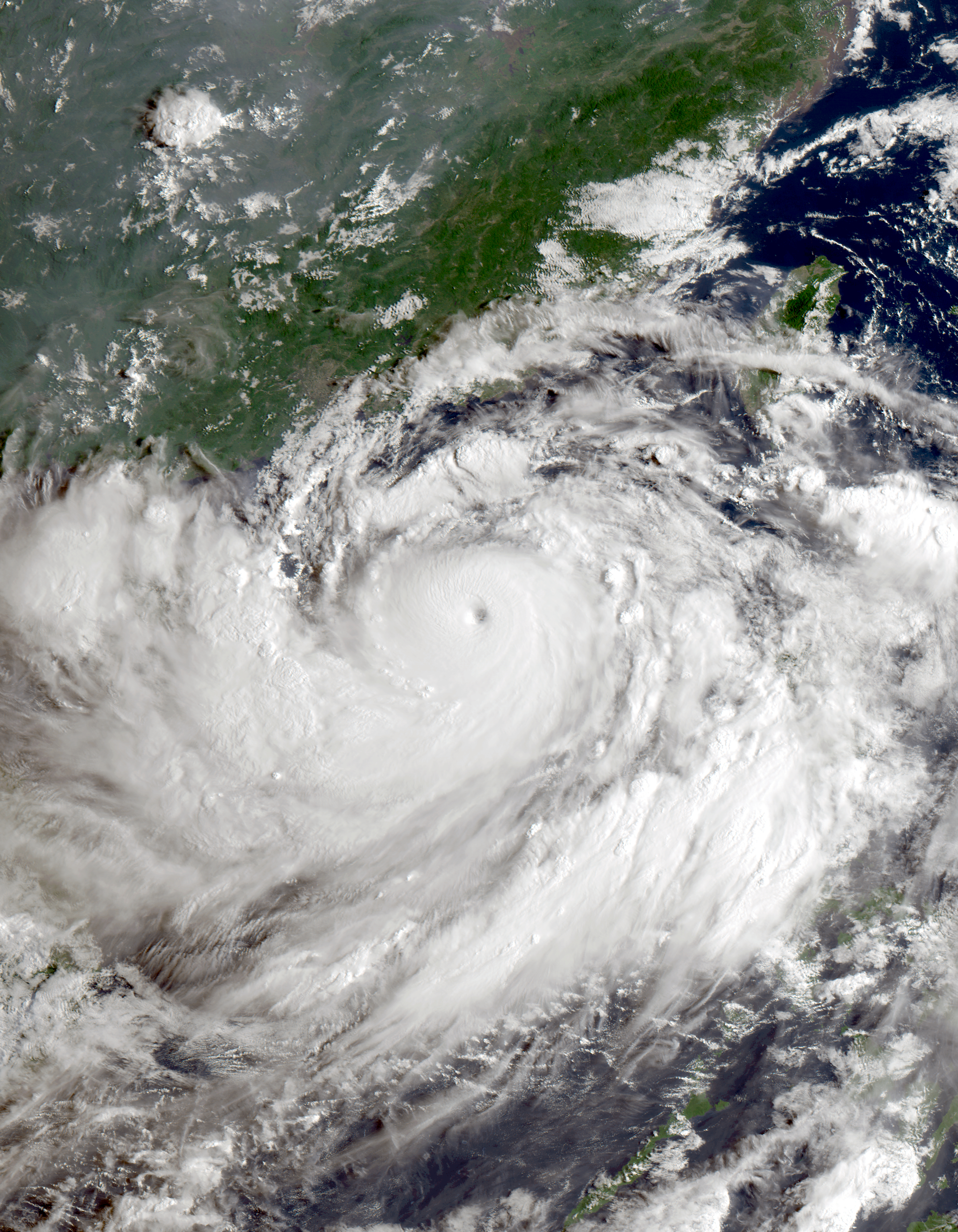
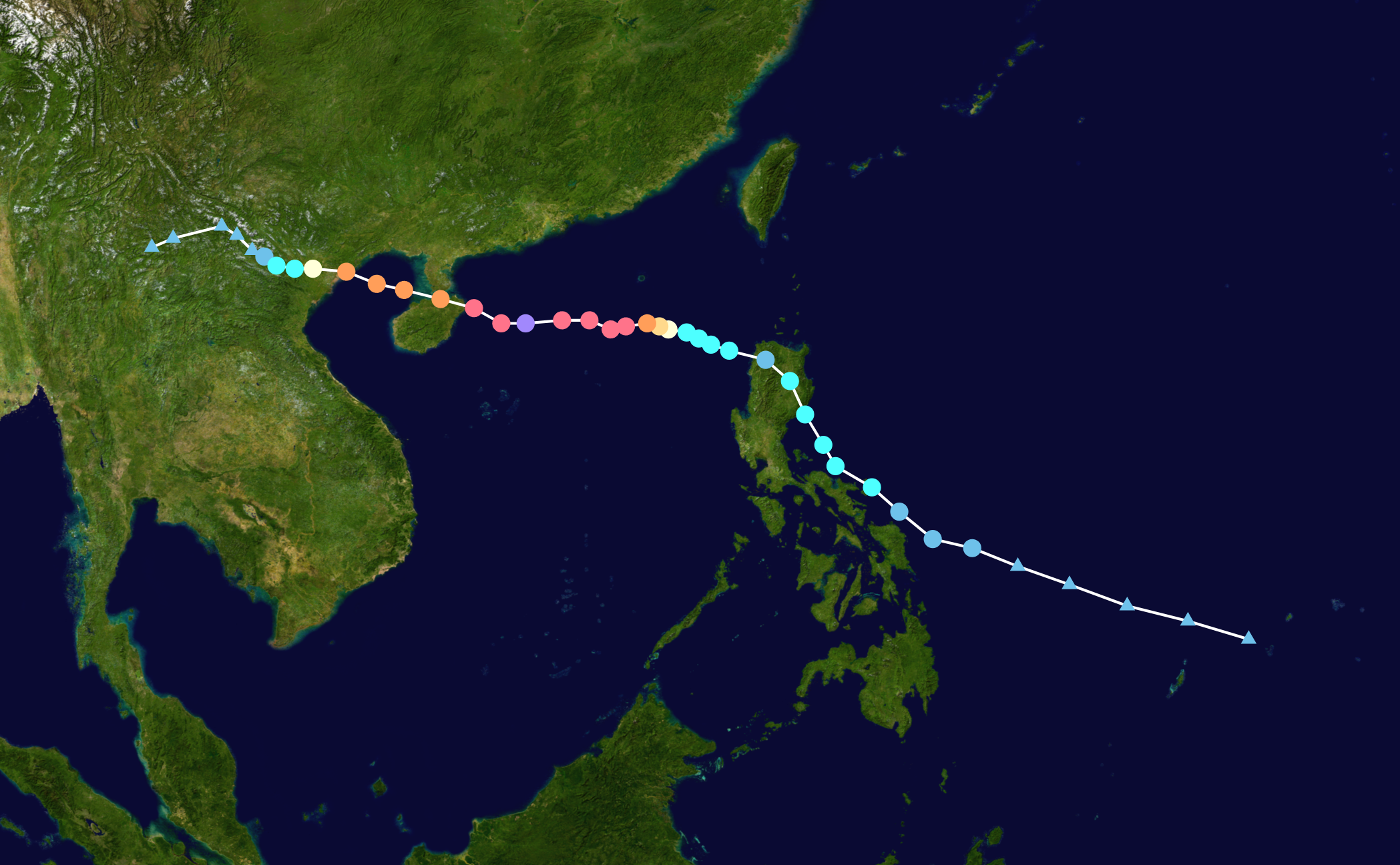
- Duration: August 31 – September 9
- Peak intensity: 195 km/h (120 mph) (10-min); 915 hPa (mbar)

On August 30, the JMA reported the formation of a low-pressure area approximately 540 km (330 mi) northwest of Palau. This broad low-pressure system began to organize and developed into a tropical depression on August 31. The following day, PAGASA designated the system as a tropical depression and named it Enteng, as it formed within the Philippine Area of Responsibility. Shortly after, the system was classified as Tropical Depression 12W. As it intensified into a tropical storm, the JMA named it Yagi. At 14:00 PHT (06:00 UTC) on September 2, Yagi made landfall in Casiguran, Aurora. Early the next day, both the JMA and the JTWC upgraded the storm to a typhoon as satellite imagery revealed the formation of an eye. On September 5, Yagi reached peak intensity as a Category 5-equivalent super typhoon, with 1-minute sustained winds of 260 km/h (160 mph) and a central pressure of 915 mbar (27.0 inHg). It made landfall in Wenchang City, Hainan, and passed directly over Haikou, China, before moving into the open waters of the Gulf of Tonkin and making landfall over Xuwen County in Guangdong. On September 7, Yagi reorganized and restrengthened into a Category 4-equivalent typhoon before making its final landfall over Haiphong and Quảng Ninh, Vietnam. It continued to weaken rapidly as it moved southwest along the southeastern edge of a mid-level subtropical high, becoming a tropical depression on September 8. The JMA monitored Yagi until it was last noted at 18:00 UTC that day.

Yagi, combined with the effects of the southwest monsoon, resulted in at least 21 deaths, 22 injuries and 26 missing people in the Philippines. Yagi also caused extensive damages, landslides and floods in Vietnam, Laos, Thailand and Myanmar and left 815 people dead.

=== Tropical Storm Leepi ===
- Tropical storm (JMA)
- Tropical storm (SSHWS)
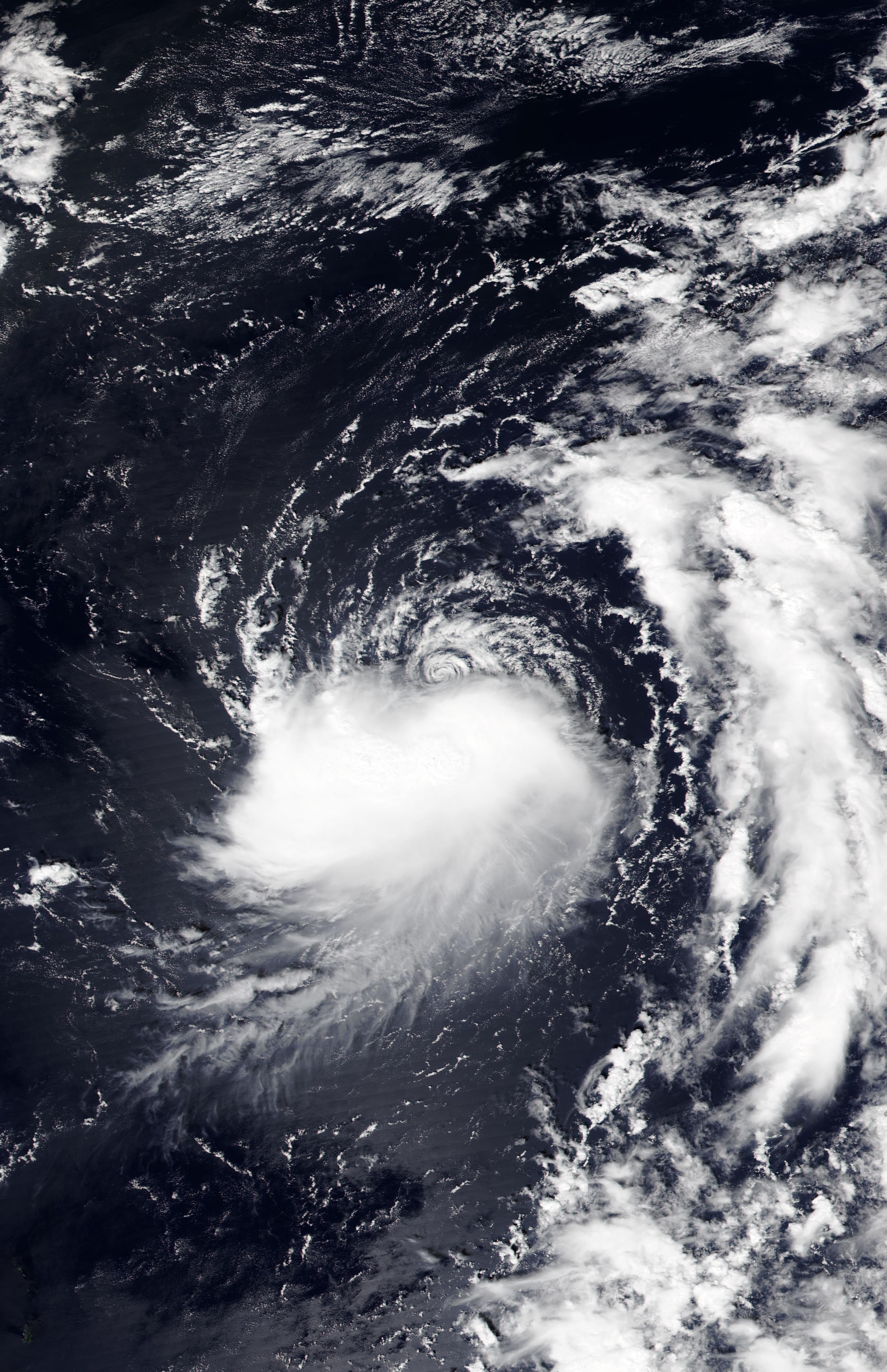
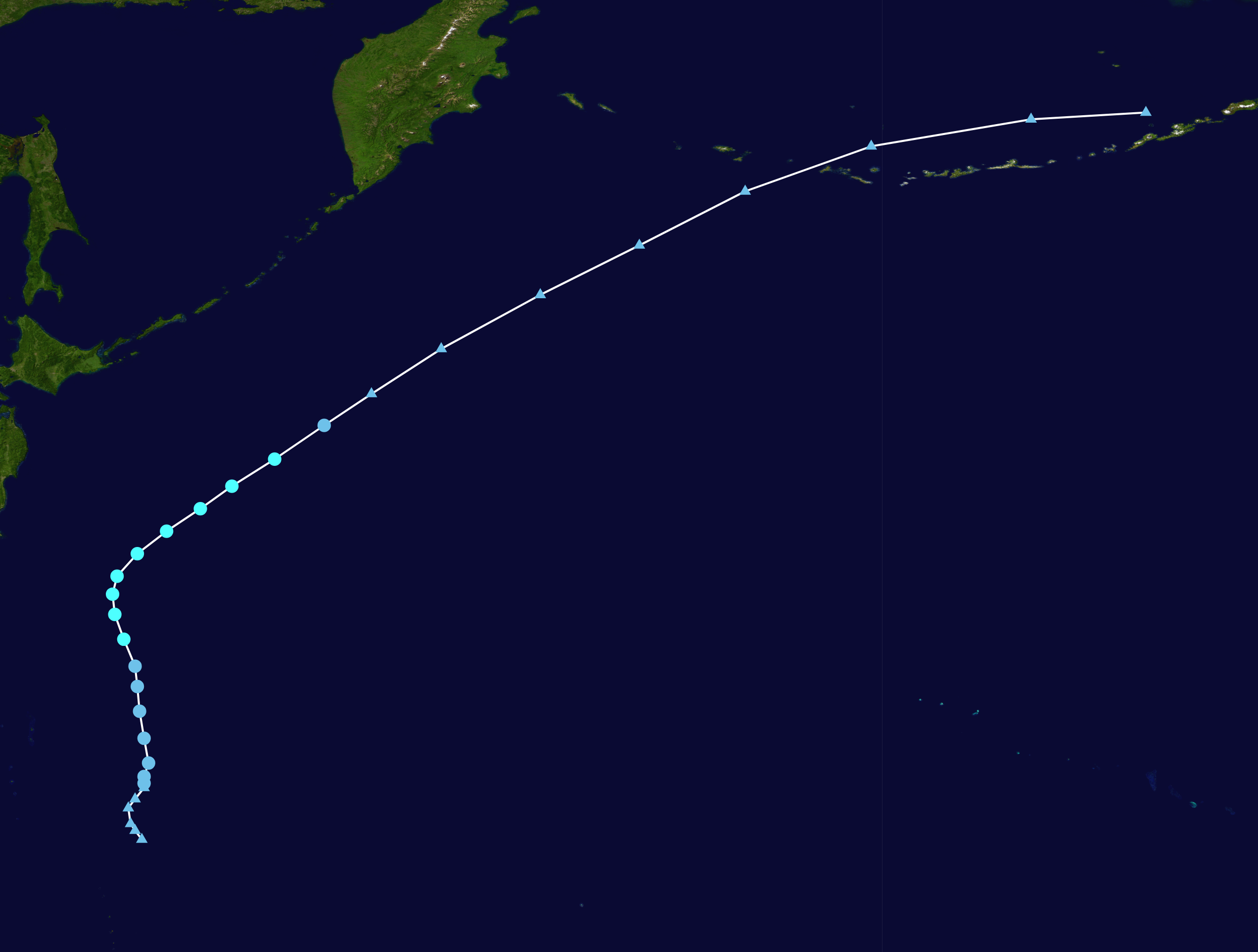
- Duration: September 1 – September 7
- Peak intensity: 65 km/h (40 mph) (10-min); 1002 hPa (mbar)

On September 2, the Japan Meteorological Agency noted that a tropical depression had formed over the open Pacific. Despite unfavorable conditions, JTWC later issued a TCFA warning, citing that it will intensify in the upcoming days. Two days later, the JTWC designated the system as Tropical Depression 13W. A day later, JMA reported that it intensified into a tropical storm, assigning the name Leepi. Although the storm was in a high wind shear and unfavorable environment, Leepi continued to maintain that intensity as it accelerated northeastward. Satellite imagery depicted that the low-level circulation center (LLCC) of Leepi passed under strong upper-level southwesterly flow, indicated by a broad region of cirrus streamers. The storm did not last long, and JTWC later announced its final warning on September 6 as the system transitioned to an extratropical cyclone. The JMA later followed suit and issued its final advisory on 18:00 UTC of September 6.

=== Typhoon Bebinca (Ferdie) ===
- Typhoon (JMA)
- Category 1 typhoon (SSHWS)
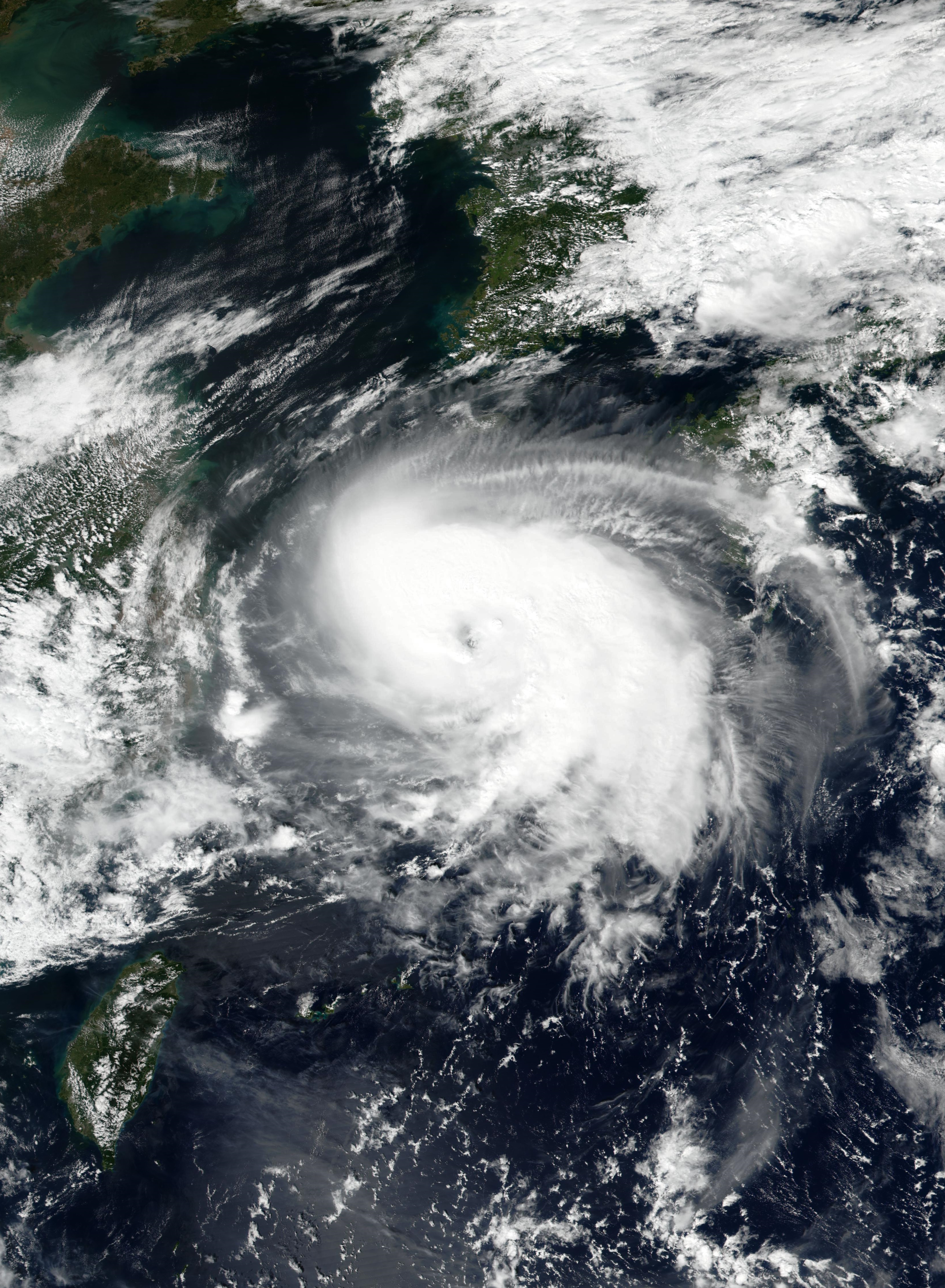
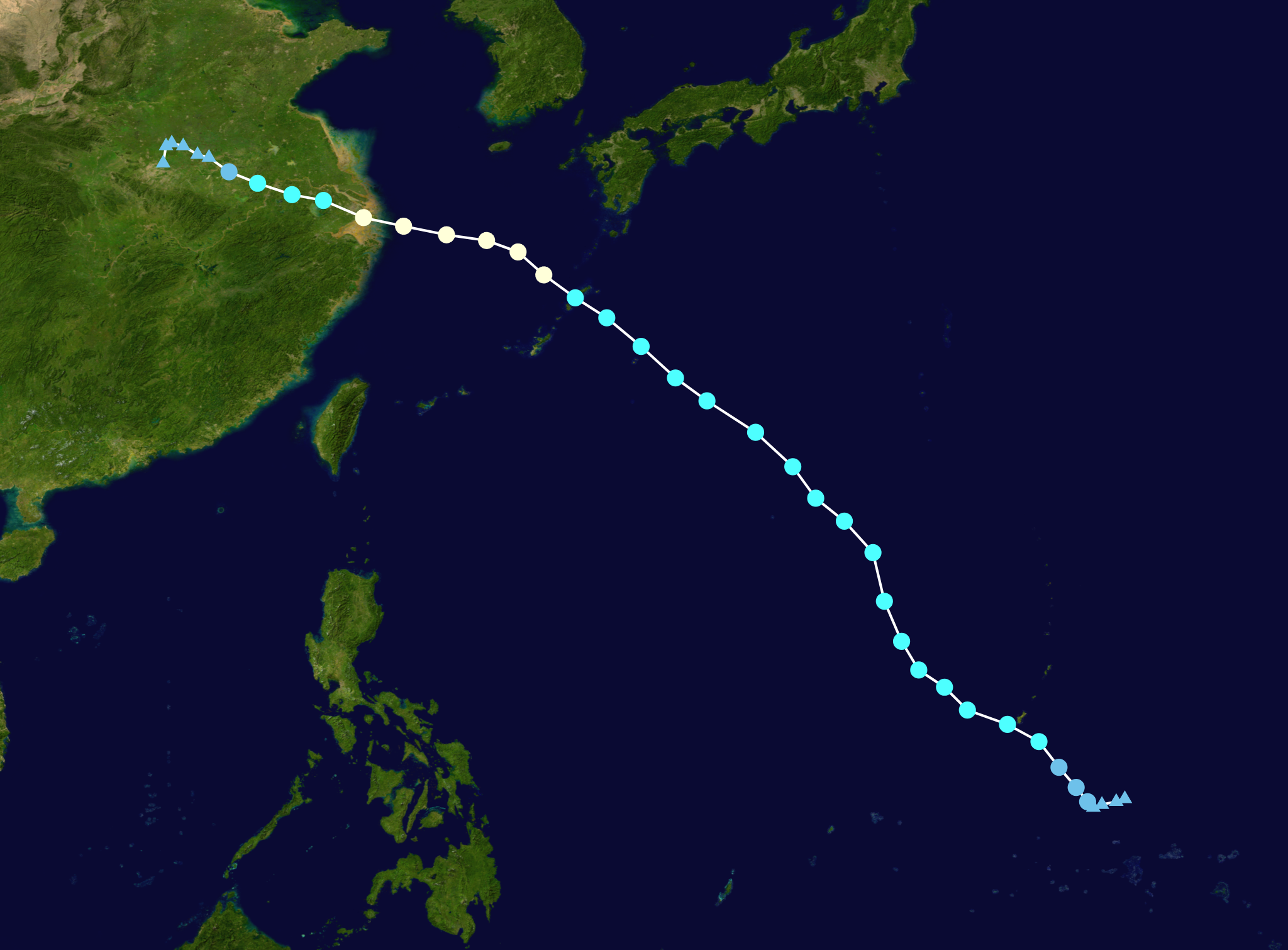
- Duration: September 9 – September 18
- Peak intensity: 140 km/h (85 mph) (10-min); 965 hPa (mbar)

On September 5, the JTWC noted an area of atmospheric convection 385 km (239 mi) east-northeast of Kosrae. At 02:30 UTC on September 9, the JTWC issued a TCFA, noting that the system had become well-defined with formative banding in the eastern quadrants. A few hours later, both the JMA and the JTWC followed suit and upgraded the tropical depression, with the latter designating the system as 14W. On September 10, the depression intensified into a tropical storm and was named Bebinca (2413) by the JMA. By 18:00 PHT (10:00 UTC) on September 13, Bebinca had entered the PAR and was subsequently named Ferdie by the PAGASA, but just a few hours later, it exited the PAR. The JMA reported that Bebinca reached its peak intensity at 00:00 UTC on September 15 with 10-minute sustained winds of 140 km/h (85 mph) and a central pressure of 965 hPa (28.50 inHg), before eventually peaking at Category 1-equivalent intensity on the Saffir-Simpson scale with 1-minute sustained winds of 140 km/h (85 mph). On September 16, at around 07:30 CST, Bebinca made landfall in Lingang New City, Shanghai, China. Shortly after landfall, the JTWC discontinued warnings on the system. Inland, Bebinca quickly diminished to a severe tropical storm due to land interaction, with the JMA tracking the system until it was last noted on September 18.

Bebinca became the second storm to hit China within a few weeks, following Yagi's landfall on Hainan Island in the southern part of the country. At least 30,000 households lost power. Four homes were damaged, over 10,000 trees were damaged or uprooted and 53 hectares (132 acres) of farmland were flooded. In China, two people were killed, while one person was injured. The storm also left six people dead, eleven others injured and two people missing in the Philippines.

=== Tropical Storm Pulasan (Helen) ===
- Tropical storm (JMA)
- Tropical storm (SSHWS)
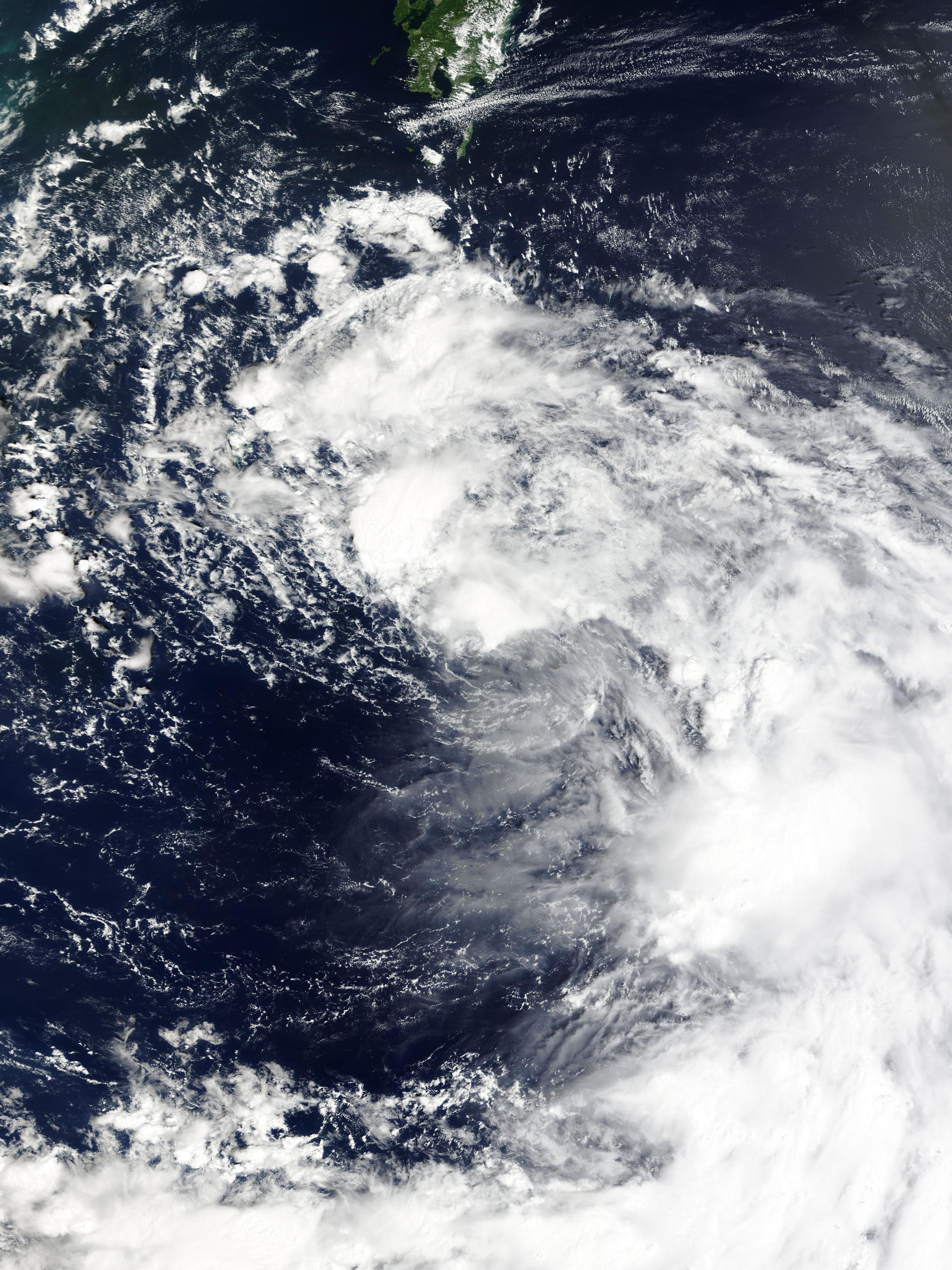
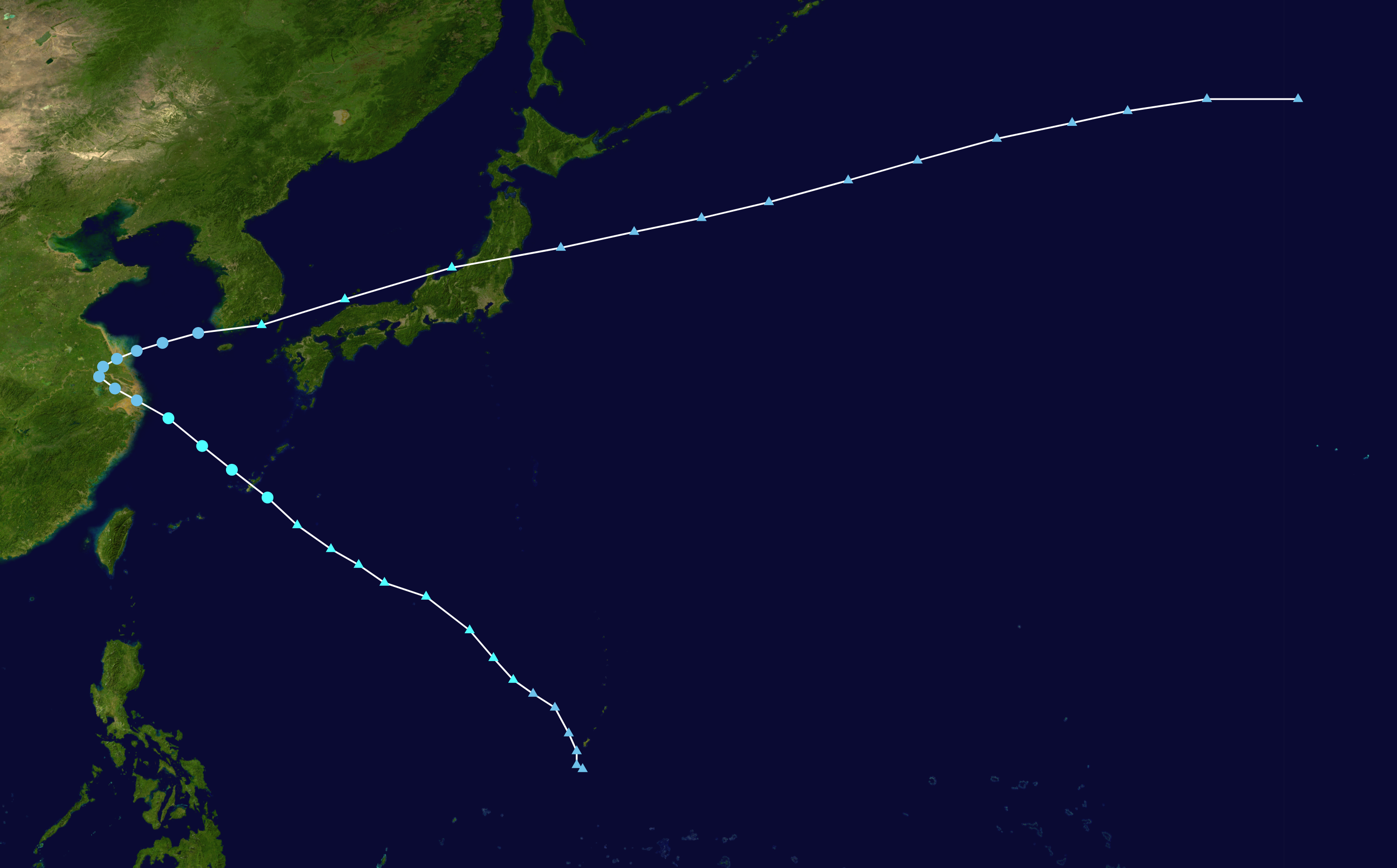
- Duration: September 15 – September 21
- Peak intensity: 85 km/h (50 mph) (10-min); 992 hPa (mbar)

On September 14, the JTWC noted an area of atmospheric convection west-southwest of Andersen Air Force Base, Guam. At 00:00 UTC on September 15, the JMA designated the system as a low-pressure area before naming it Pulasan later that day after it strengthened into a tropical storm. On September 16, the JTWC classified it as a monsoon depression before upgrading it to Tropical Storm 15W. Entering the PAR on September 17, PAGASA assigned the local name Helen. After exiting the PAR the next day, Pulasan made landfall in Zhoushan, Zhejiang, and Shanghai on September 19, just days after Typhoon Bebinca also affected the same areas. It reemerged over the East China Sea on September 20 before transitioning into an extratropical low by 06:00 UTC on September 21.

Heavy rains from Pulasan caused major flooding and landslides across the Noto Peninsula in Japan, leaving one missing, destroying many buildings and forcing 60,700 residents to be evacuated. The town of Wajima was especially affected. The remnants of Pulasan have also caused wind warnings for several areas in British Columbia, including the B.C. Coast, sections of Vancouver Island, the Central Coast, and Haida Gwaii.

=== Tropical Storm Soulik (Gener) ===
- Tropical storm (JMA)
- Tropical storm (SSHWS)
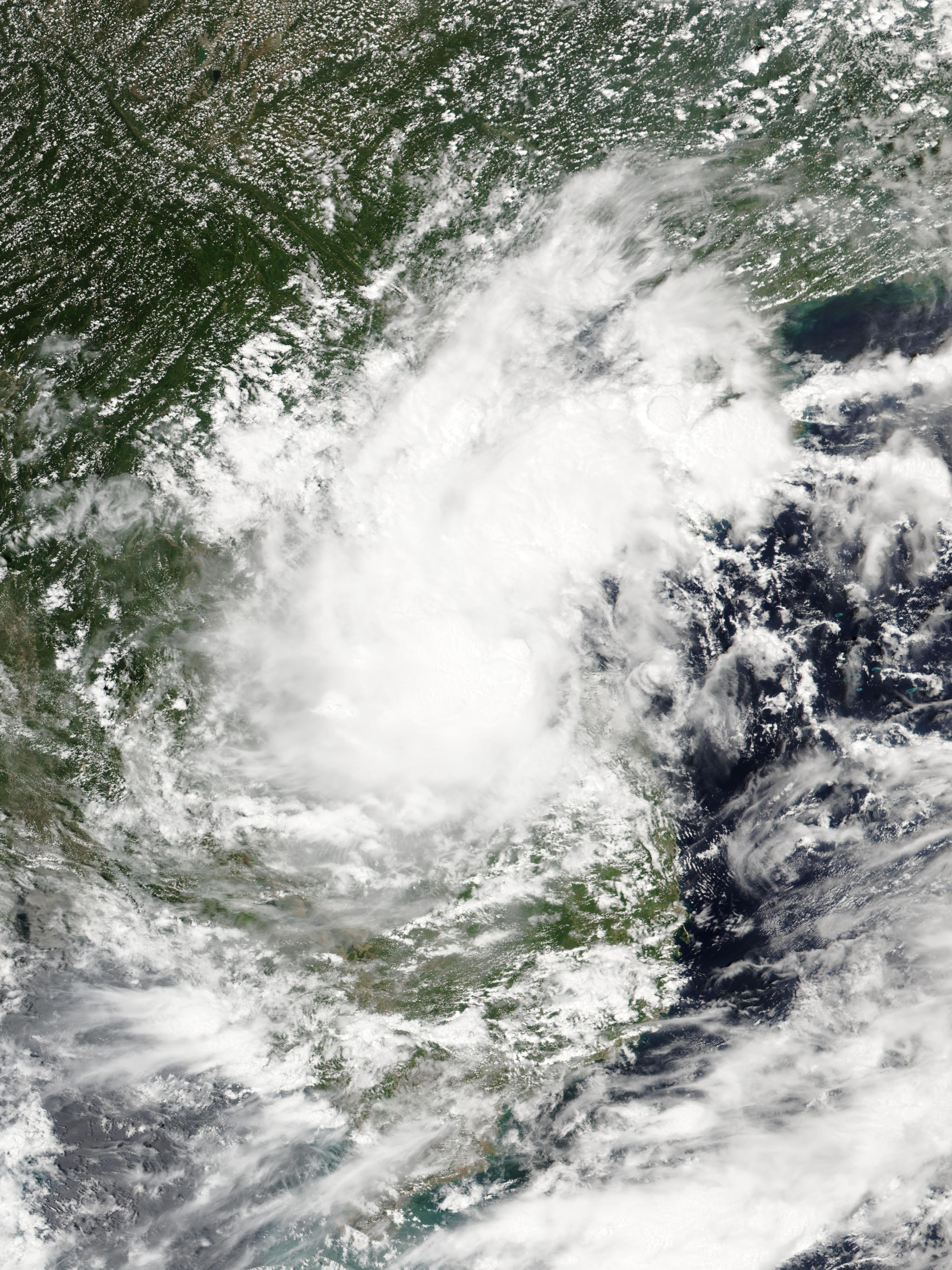
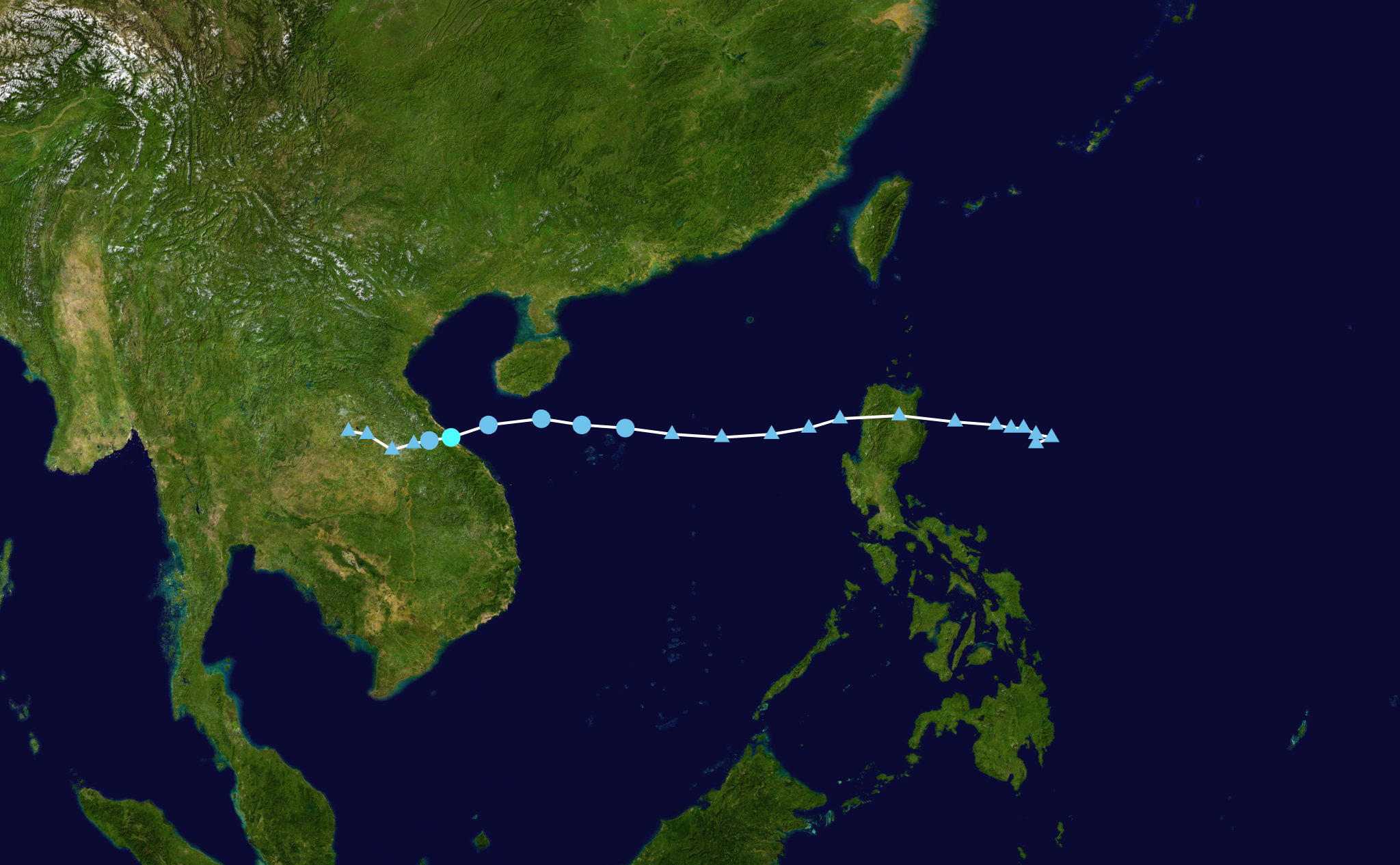
- Duration: September 15 – September 20
- Peak intensity: 65 km/h (40 mph) (10-min); 992 hPa (mbar)

On September 14, the JMA reported that a low-pressure area had formed approximately 596 km (371 mi) east-northeast of Manila, Philippines. At 00:00 UTC on September 15, the JMA identified the system as a tropical depression. On September 16, the PAGASA announced that the system had developed into a tropical depression and named Gener, as it formed within the PAR. At 23:00 PHT (15:00 UTC) of the same day, the storm made landfall in Palanan, Isabela. As it emerged over the South China Sea at 14:00 PHT (06:00 UTC) on the next day, the system displayed a broad disorganized low-level circulation. On September 18, the JTWC canceled their TCFA due to an obscured low-level circulation with flaring convection, while the depression had drifted into an area of moderate vertical wind shear. Earlier, two disturbances in the South China Sea near 98W and 99W were expected to merge and strengthen at 98W, closer to Vietnam, and shortly after, the system was classified as tropical depression 16W Early the following day, the depression intensified into a tropical storm named Soulik, according to the JMA, while heading towards the northern coast of Vietnam, though it was gradually weakening. Soulik made landfall in Vĩnh Linh District, Quảng Trị, Vietnam, at around 2 p.m. local time that day, Soulik quickly weakened to a tropical depression due to land interaction, and the JMA continued to monitor the system until it dissipated on September 20.

Heavy rain and flooding in Central Vietnam caused by Soulik killed three people in Nghe An and injured one person in Thua Thien Hue. Heavy rainfall in Thailand caused by Soulik has led officials in Nakhon Phanom to quickly start water pumping operations into the Mekong River, and Ao Phang Nga National Park had also been closed due to the weather conditions.

=== Tropical Depression 17W (Igme) ===
- Tropical depression (JMA)
- Tropical depression (SSHWS)
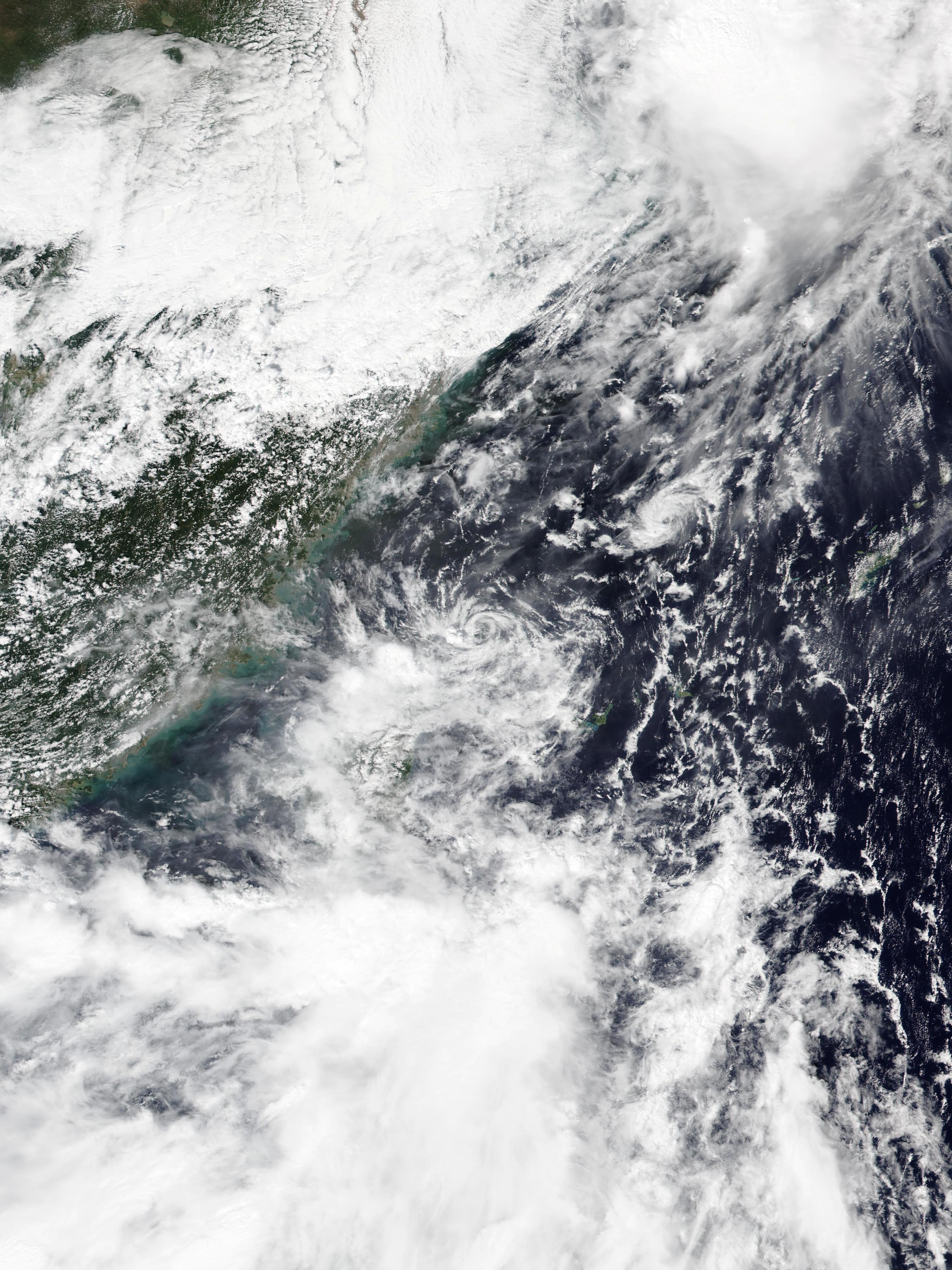
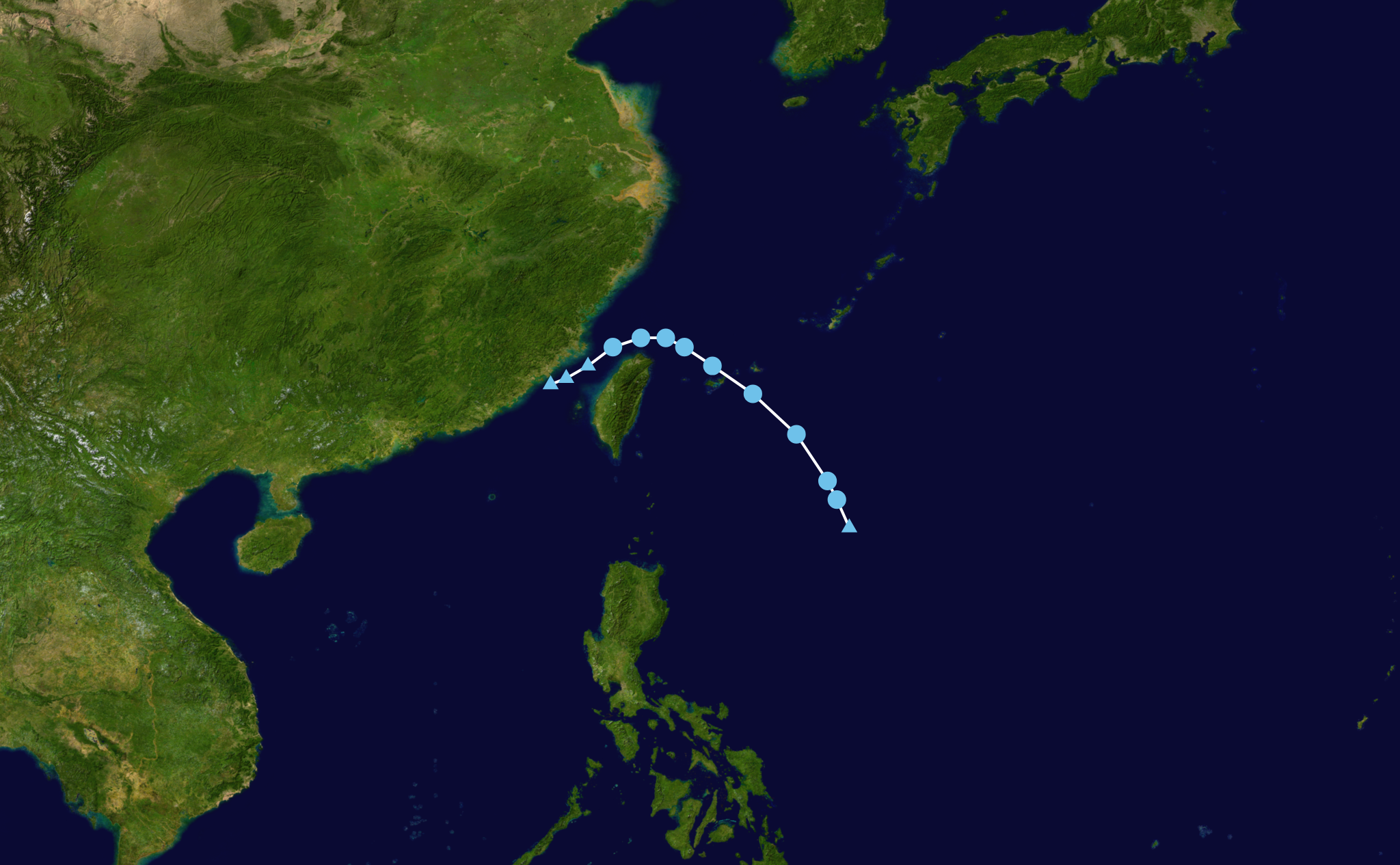
- Duration: September 20 – September 21
- Peak intensity: 55 km/h (35 mph) (10-min); 1002 hPa (mbar)

On September 20, a tropical depression formed near northern Luzon. The disturbance was in a marginal environment, with moderate to high wind shear and warm sea surface temperature. Hours later, JMA later recognized the LPA as a depression. At 14:00 PHT of the same day, PAGASA followed suit and named the system as Igme. JTWC later issued a TCFA warning as the LLCC started to organize. The next day, the JTWC upgraded Igme as a tropical depression and designated it as 17W. Igme later curved southwestwards, passing closely through Taiwan with the JMA last noting it as it became embedded in a front. On September 22, the JTWC reported that Igme had strengthened into a tropical storm as it neared China, though reanalysis showed that it remained as a depression throughout its track. JTWC later discontinued issuing bulletins on Igme after high vertical wind shear and the topographic interaction had caused to weaken significantly and dissipated after.

=== Tropical Storm Cimaron ===
- Tropical storm (JMA)
- Tropical storm (SSHWS)
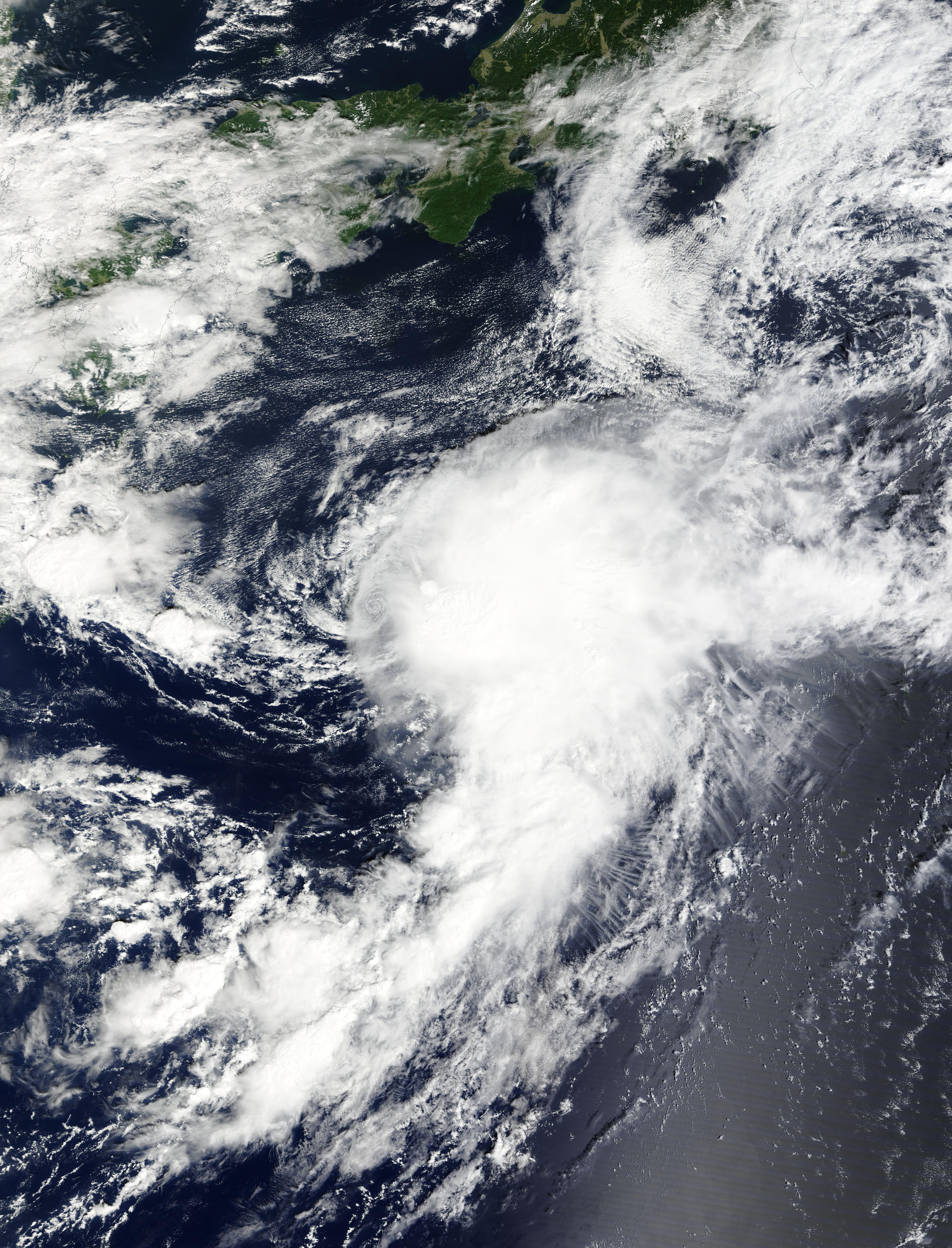
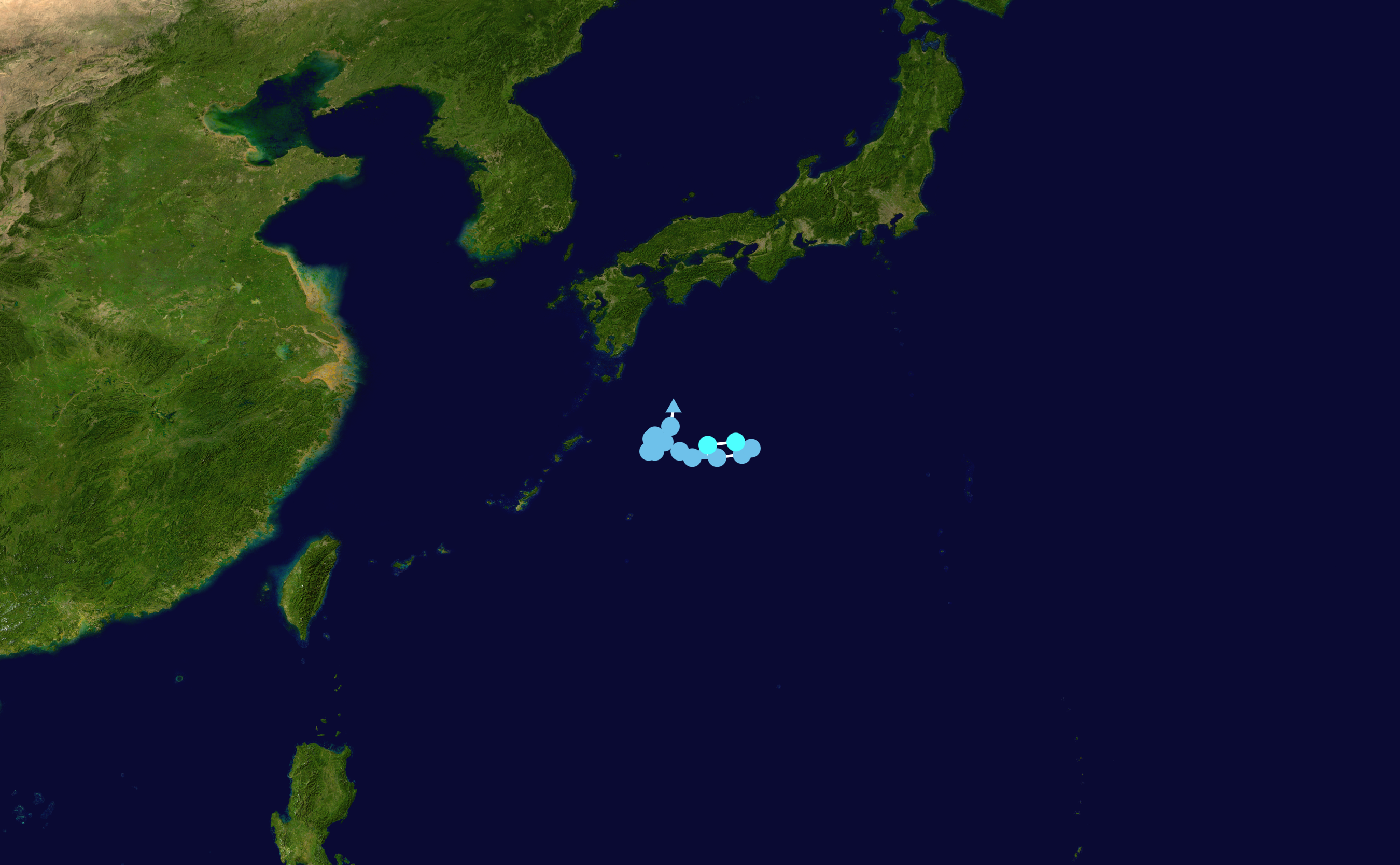
- Duration: September 23 – September 27
- Peak intensity: 65 km/h (40 mph) (10-min); 998 hPa (mbar)

On September 24, a tropical depression formed south of Japan, designated as 18W by the JTWC later that same day. The following day, 18W was upgraded by the JMA to become a tropical storm, thereby earning the name Cimaron. JTWC later followed suit and upgraded into a storm as it moved westward. Cimaron later moved northeastward, with the presence of moderate and high shear, which caused a weakening of a tropical depression. The environmental analysis also depicted that Cimaron is in an unfavorable environment, characterized by moderate poleward outflow and the presence of dry air. At the latter part of September 27, JTWC reported that Cimaron became a remnant low due to its increasing vertical wind shear, resulted of eroding of the low-level circulation center (LLCC). The agency made its final warning as it absorbed within the frontal boundary. The JMA downgraded the system to a low-pressure area on 18:00 UTC of the same day.

=== Typhoon Jebi ===
- Typhoon (JMA)
- Category 1 typhoon (SSHWS)
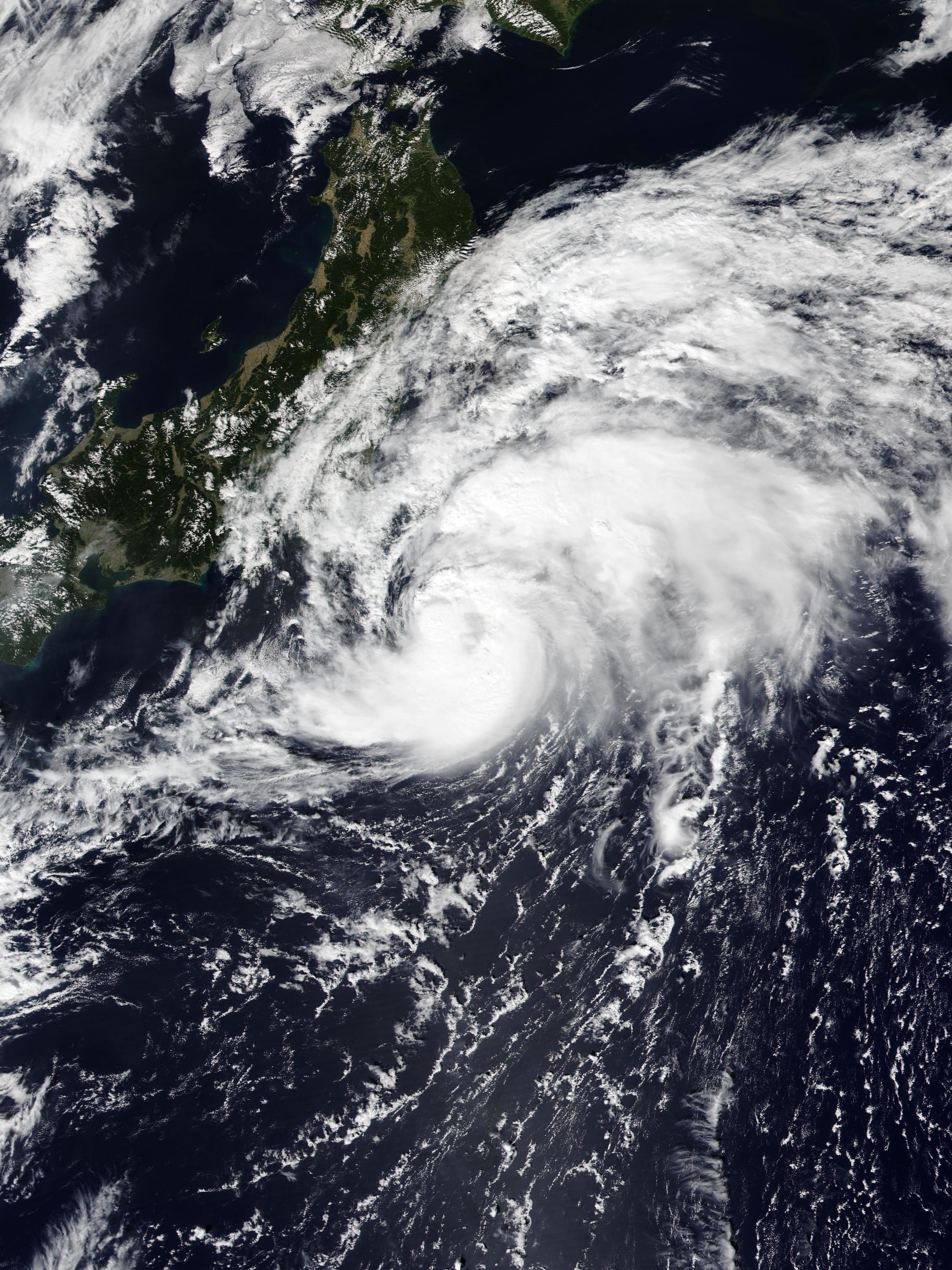
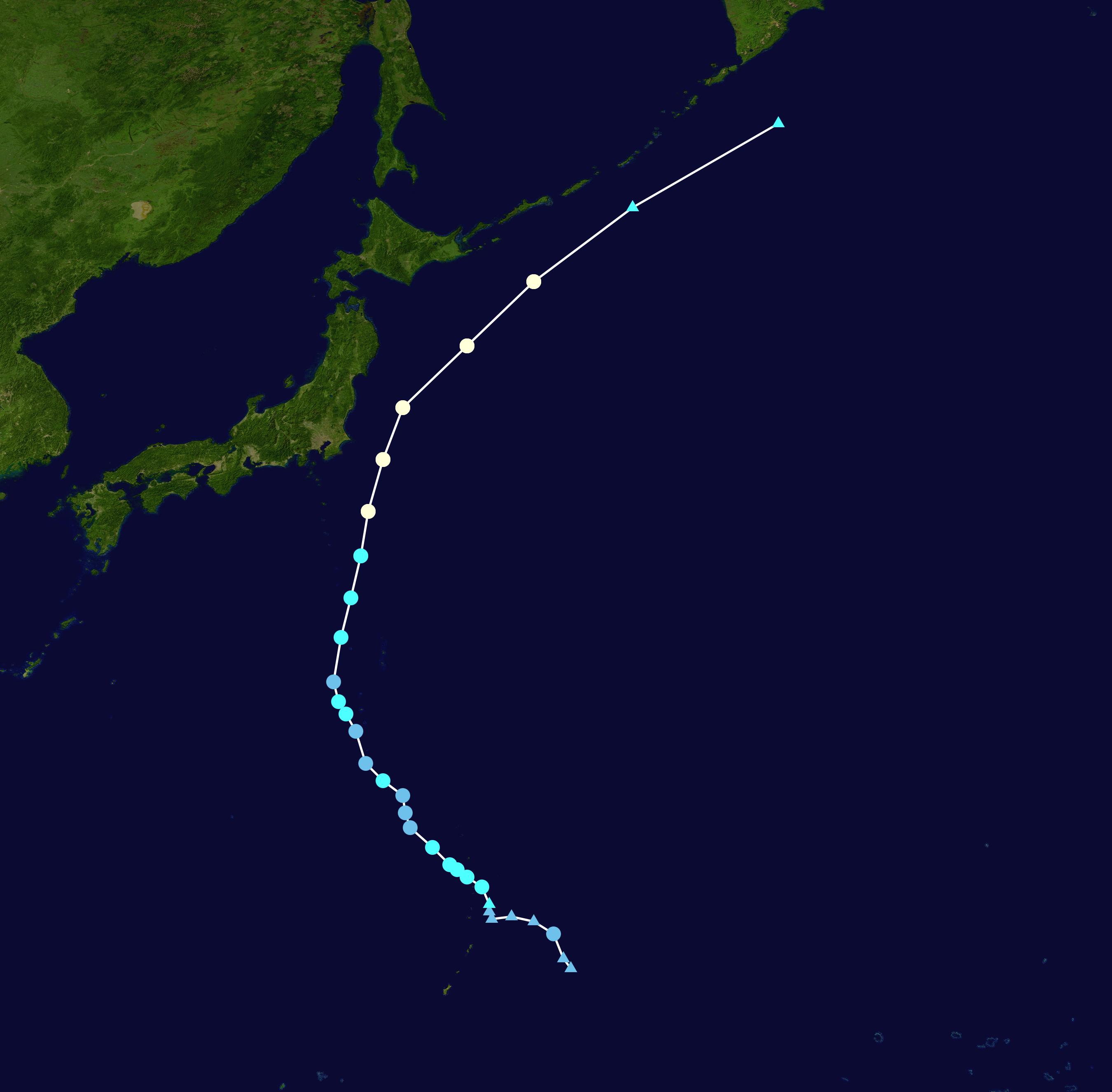
- Duration: September 25 – October 2
- Peak intensity: 120 km/h (75 mph) (10-min); 980 hPa (mbar)

On September 25, a tropical depression formed near the Northern Mariana Islands. Later that day, JTWC started issuing advisories, stating that it would gradually intensify in the upcoming days. On September 26, it was classified as 19W by the JTWC as it was in a marginally favorable environment. 19W developed into a tropical storm, thus gaining the name Jebi (Note: Jebi was contributed by South Korea and means barn swallow in Korean.) by the JMA. Satellite imagery shows that Jebi struggled to organize as moderate low-level wind shear was present. The storm was downgraded back into a depression on September 28. However, Jebi regained tropical storm status for the second time as it moved northeastwards. On October 1, Jebi further strengthened into a Category 1-equivalent typhoon according to the JTWC, while JMA retained severe tropical storm status. Both agencies later issued their final warning the next day, as Jebi became an extratropical cyclone.

Although Jebi did not hit any major land areas, due to its name having an inappropriate meaning in Croatian, it was retired following the season. In 2026, the name will be replaced with Narae, which means wing in Korean language.

=== Typhoon Krathon (Julian) ===
- Violent typhoon (JMA)
- Category 4 super typhoon (SSHWS)
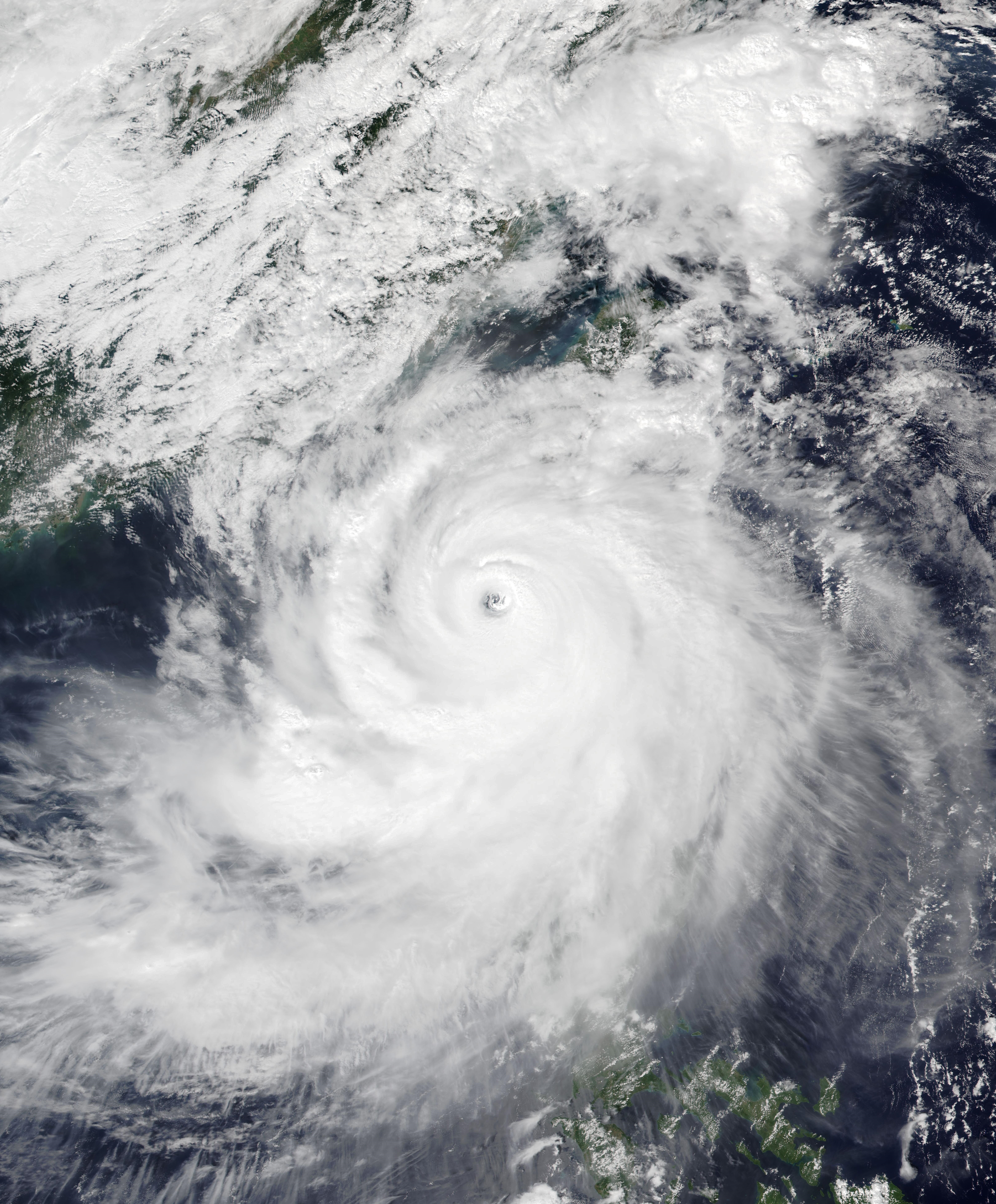
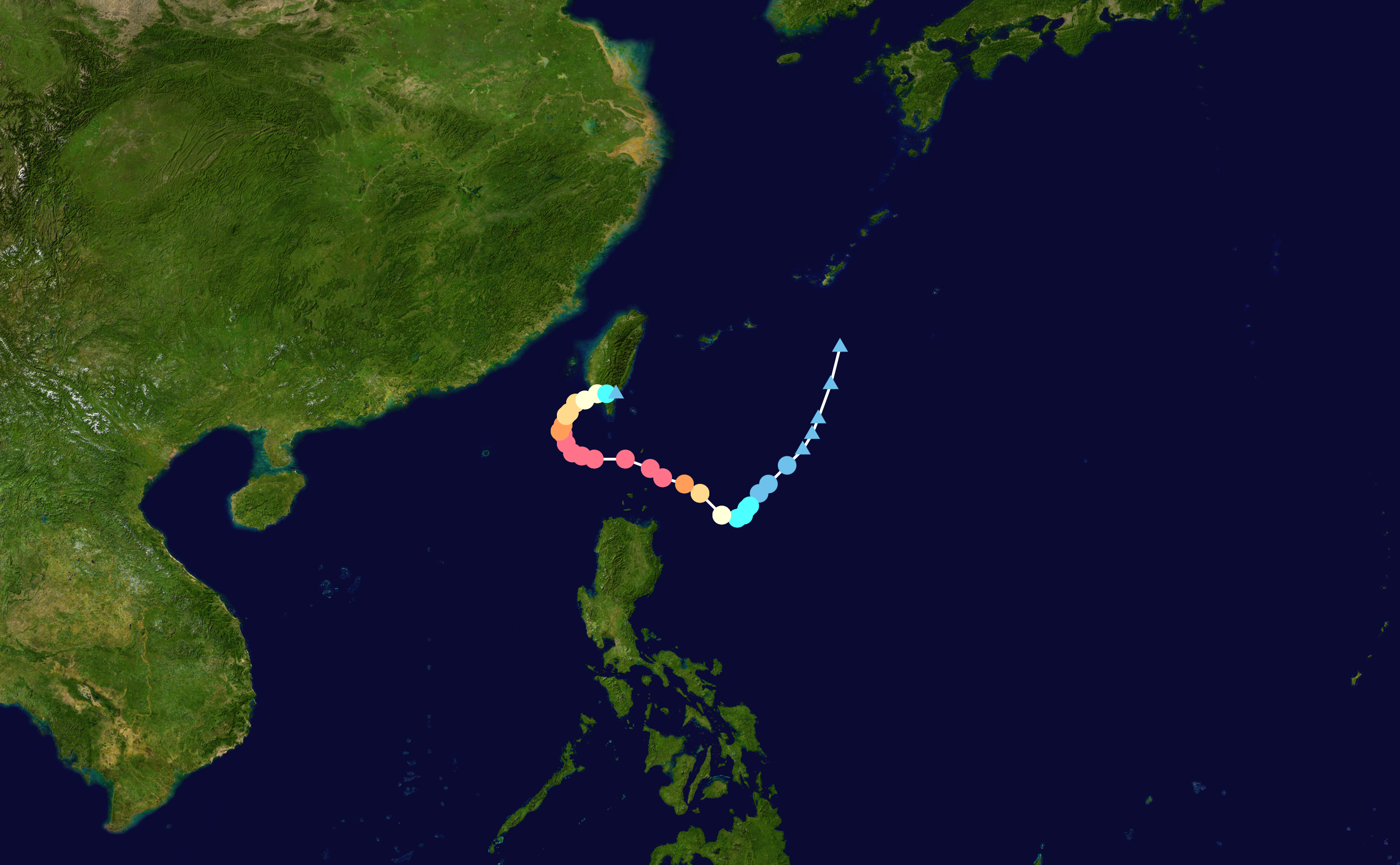
- Duration: September 26 – October 3
- Peak intensity: 195 km/h (120 mph) (10-min); 920 hPa (mbar)

On September 26, the JMA reported a tropical depression 250 km (155 mi) south-southwest of Kadena Air Base, Japan, with a partially exposed low-level circulation centre, persistent deep convection in the southern semicircle, and formative banding to the north. The next day, PAGASA locally named the system as Julian, while the JTWC upgraded it to Tropical Depression 20W at 09:00 UTC. On September 28, the system strengthened into Tropical Storm Krathon as it moved southwestward along the southeastern periphery of a mid-level subtropical high. Early the next day, both the JMA and JTWC upgraded it to a minimal typhoon after it developed a broad, raggedly-defined eye, which later became cloud-filled. Early on October 1, the JMA upgraded Krathon to a violent typhoon, estimating a minimum central pressure of 915 hPa (27.02 inHg) and 10-minute sustained winds of 195 km/h (120 mph). On October 3 at 12:40 CST (18:40 UTC), Krathon made landfall near Siaogang District in Kaohsiung, Taiwan as a weakening Category-1 typhoon. After landfall, it slowed and rapidly weakened to a depression. The JMA continued tracking the system as it emerged into the South China Sea before it dissipated on October 4.

Krathon caused landslides and flooding in parts of the Philippines, leaving five people dead and another missing. Eight others were injured. Four deaths, 714 injuries and one missing person was also reported in Taiwan.

=== Tropical Storm Barijat ===
- Tropical storm (JMA)
- Tropical storm (SSHWS)
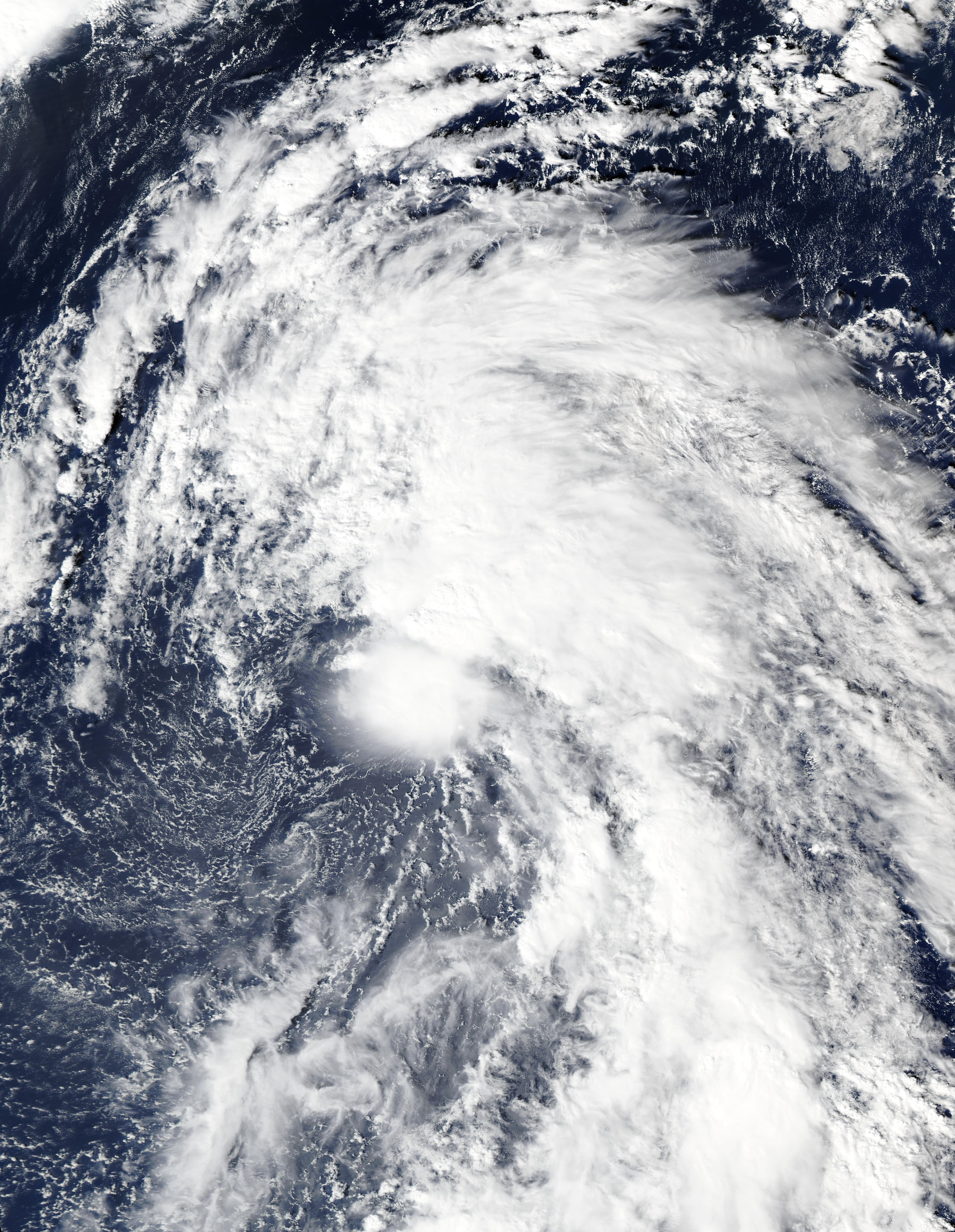
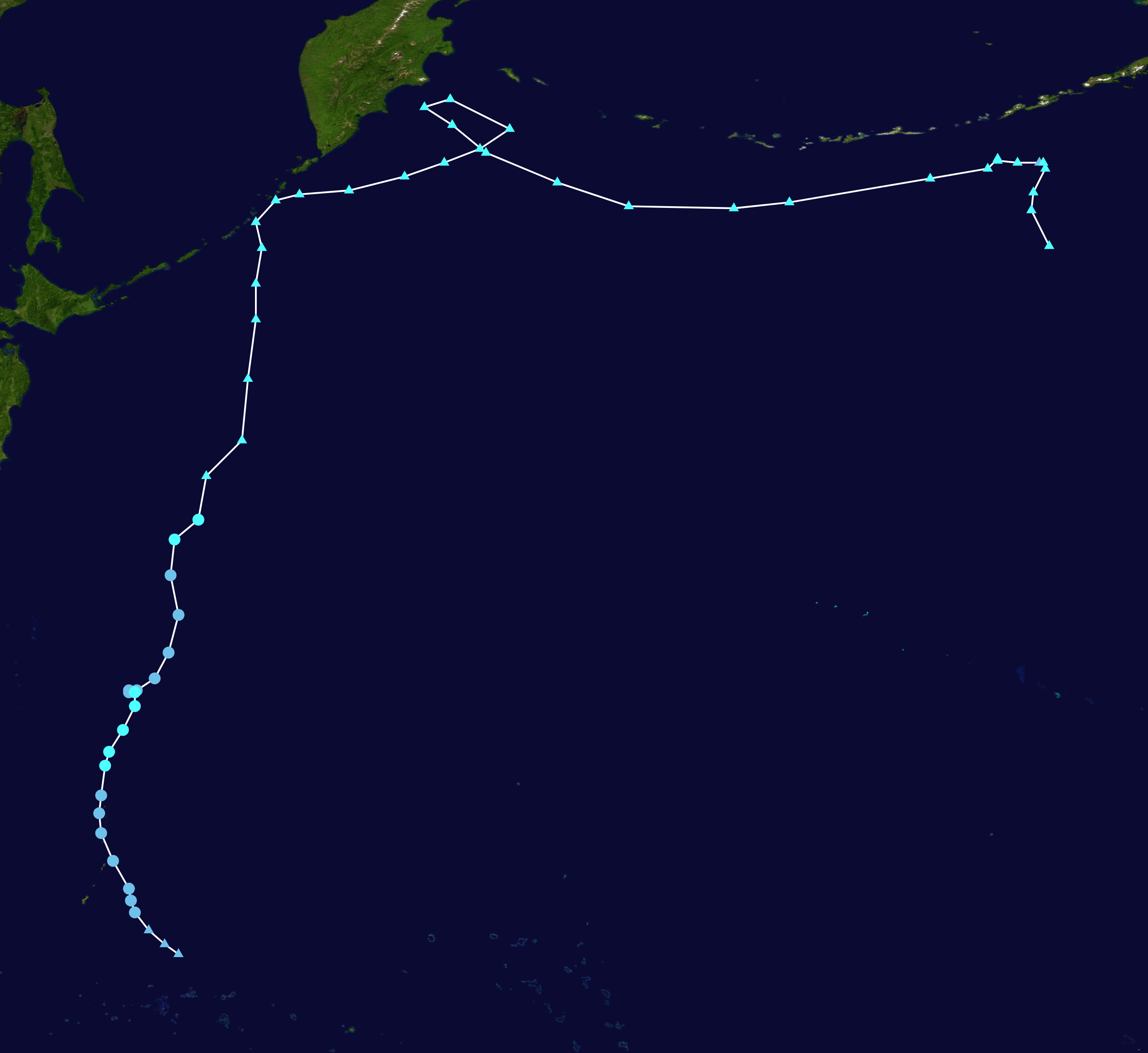
- Duration: October 4 – October 11
- Peak intensity: 85 km/h (50 mph) (10-min); 985 hPa (mbar)

A tropical depression formed near Guam on October 5. The following day, the JTWC issued a TCFA on the system and later upgraded it to Tropical Depression 21W. With convection flaring and persisting to the east of a partial low-level circulation center, the JTWC upgraded it to a tropical storm on October 7. Despite moving over warm waters, high wind shear further displaced the convection, weakening 21W to a tropical depression a few hours later. On October 8, the JTWC issued its last warning on 21W as it further weakened, with the agency expecting it to dissipate within the next 12 hours. The next day, the JMA upgraded 21W to a tropical storm, naming it Barijat. After a few hours, the JTWC reissued warnings for it. However, Barijat would begin its extratropical transition, prompting the said weather agency to issue its last warning the following day, at 09:00 UTC.

=== Severe Tropical Storm Trami (Kristine) ===
- Severe tropical storm (JMA)
- Category 1 typhoon (SSHWS)
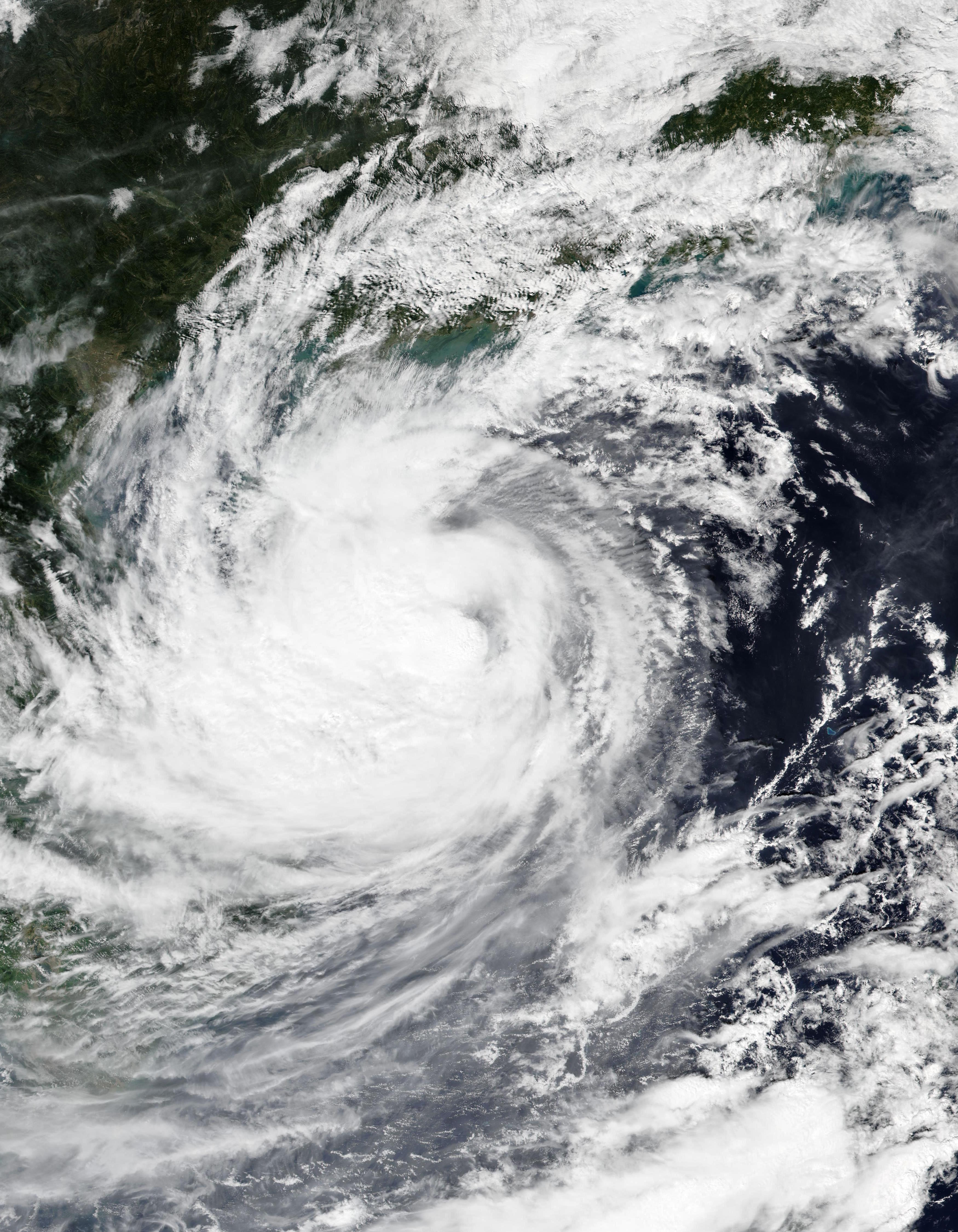
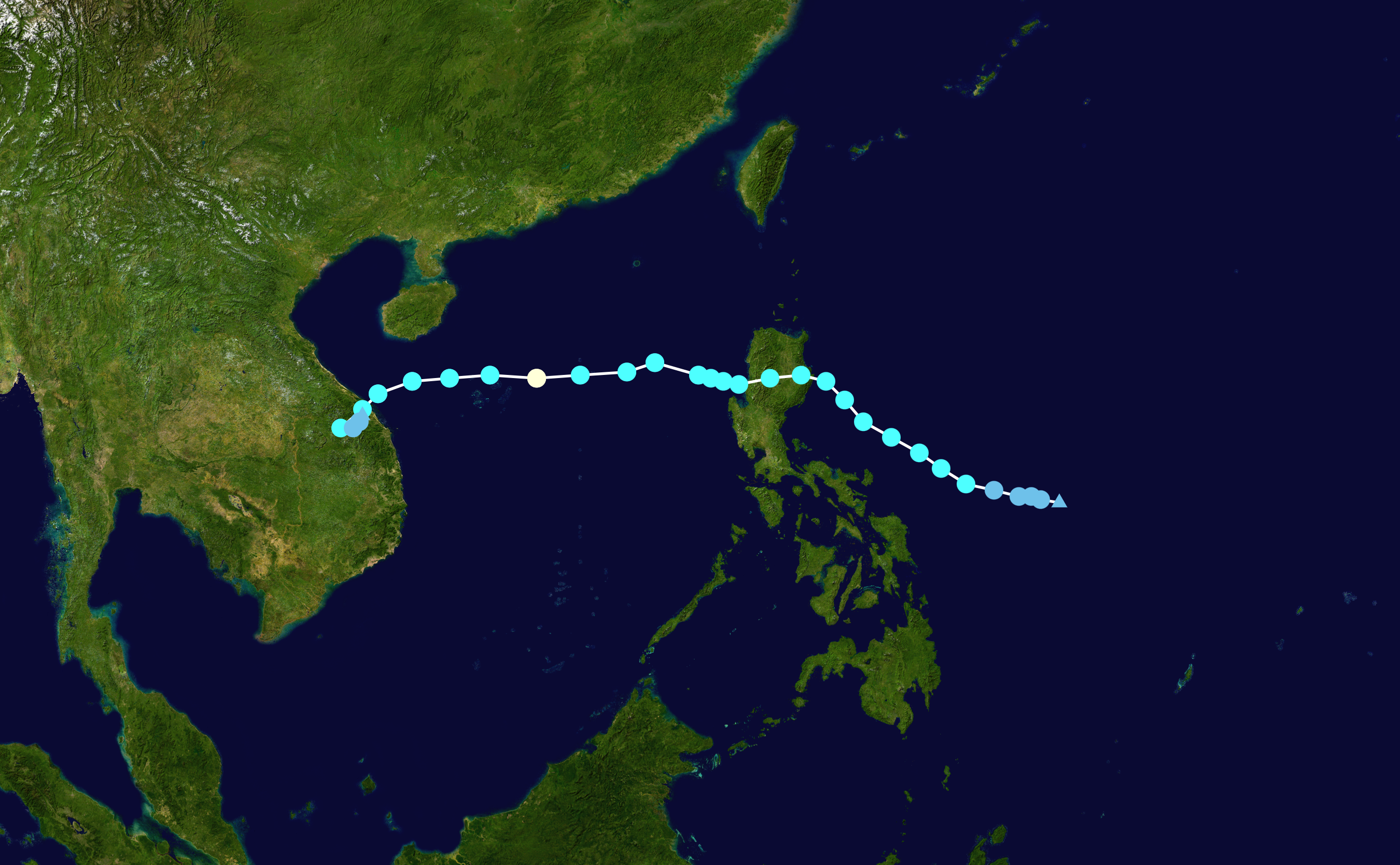
- Duration: October 18 – October 29
- Peak intensity: 110 km/h (70 mph) (10-min); 970 hPa (mbar)

On October 18, the JMA reported a low-pressure area located 633 km (394 mi) west of Guam. The low-pressure area later moved westward slowly before it was designated as a tropical depression by the JMA on October 19. The following day, the JTWC designated the system as 22W, as low-level banding wrapped into the circulation center. At 18:00 UTC that day, the JMA upgraded the system to a tropical storm and named it Trami. At around 06:00 UTC on October 23, the JMA reported that Trami had intensified into a severe tropical storm as it was moving west-northwestward along the southwestern edge of a mid-level subtropical high, At 12:30 AM PHT of October 24 (16:30 UTC on October 23), the storm made landfall in Divilacan, Isabela, The following day, Trami emerged over the coastal waters of southern Ilocos Sur and encountered easterly vertical wind shear as it approached the coast of Vietnam. It made landfall in Thua Thien-Hue and Da Nang at about 10 AM local time on October 27, before drifting slowly inland while moving southwestward over the past few hours. The storm rapidly weakened as it moved around the Laos–Vietnam border. It then moved southwestward before making a U-turn and gradually moving toward the coastal regions of Vietnam. The JMA continued to monitor the system, which further weakened into a low-pressure area at 18:00 UTC the following day.

Overall, Trami was responsible for 178 deaths, with 23 people reported missing and 151 others injured, causing approximately US$426 million in damages. In Vietnam, Trami's strong winds caused trees and billboards to fall in Da Nang, while heavy rainfall in Quang Tri province resulted in severe flooding of several bridges and left 18,000 people without power.

=== Typhoon Kong-rey (Leon) ===
- Very strong typhoon (JMA)
- Category 5 super typhoon (SSHWS)
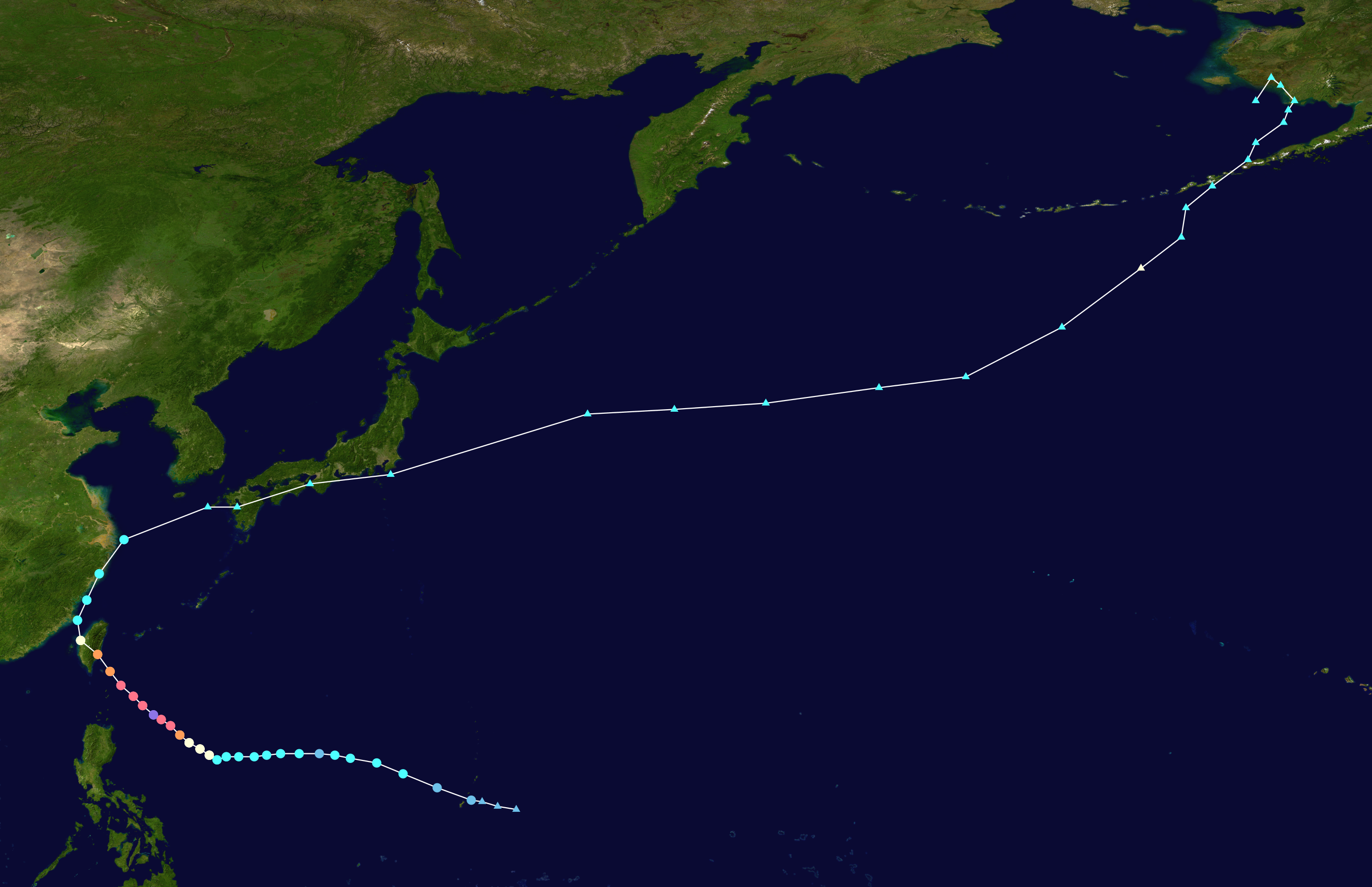
- Duration: October 24 – November 1
- Peak intensity: 185 km/h (115 mph) (10-min); 925 hPa (mbar)

On October 22, the JTWC started monitoring a weak exposed low-level circulation at 14.9°N 141.4°E, about 394 km (245 mi) west-northwest of Guam. The JMA designated the disturbance as a low-pressure area the following day, and on October 24, it was upgraded to a tropical depression. At 00:00 UTC on October 25, the JMA upgraded the system to a tropical storm named Kong-rey, which the JTWC later designated as 23W. On October 30, the JTWC reported that the system had peaked as a Category 4-equivalent super typhoon after Kong-rey attained 1-minute sustained winds of 240 km/h (150 mph), and a 10-minute sustained winds of 185 km/h (115 mph) and a central pressure of 925 hPa (27.32 inHg). The following day at 1:40 p.m. local time, Kong-rey made landfall in Chenggong, Taitung in eastern Taiwan. It was later reemerged over the Taiwan Strait with a weakened convective structure, and its rapid movement across Taiwan may be attributed to a lee-side jump. It moved along the eastern coast of China as it began its extratropical transition On November 1, JMA reported that Kong-rey had transitioned into an extratropical low as it moved north-northeastward, with JTWC alongside discontinued the warnings as it completed its extratropical transition.

Kong-rey triggered strong winds and storm surges that flooded several houses in Gonzaga, Cagayan and Batanes, and destroyed the historic Itbayat Church, the oldest church in Itbayat, Batanes. In Taiwan, typhoon warnings were issued all around the country. Multiple large wave warnings and a singular surge warnings were issued, all in the eastern coast of Taiwan. At least three people were killed and 690 others were injured in Taiwan.

=== Typhoon Yinxing (Marce) ===
- Very strong typhoon (JMA)
- Category 4 super typhoon (SSHWS)
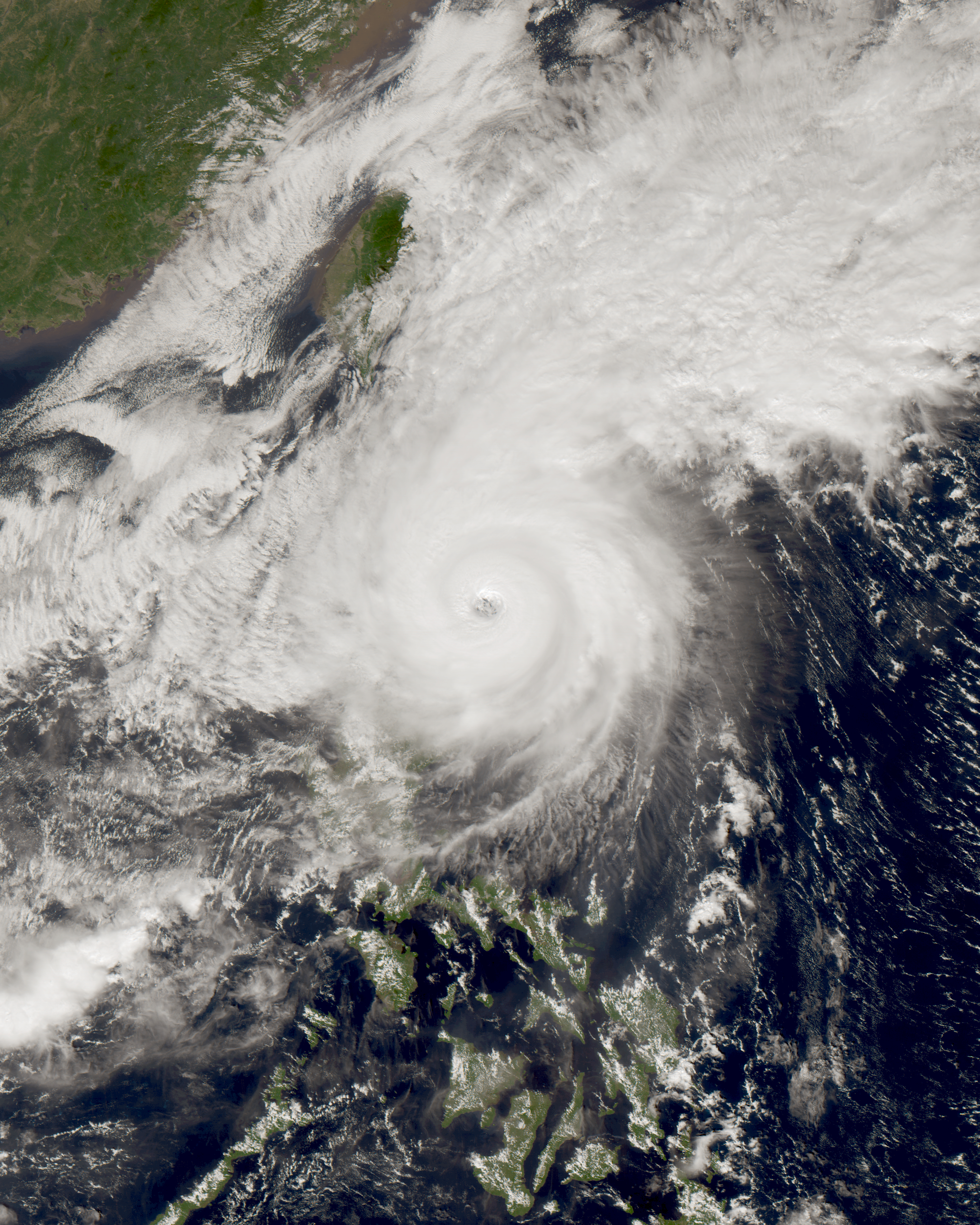
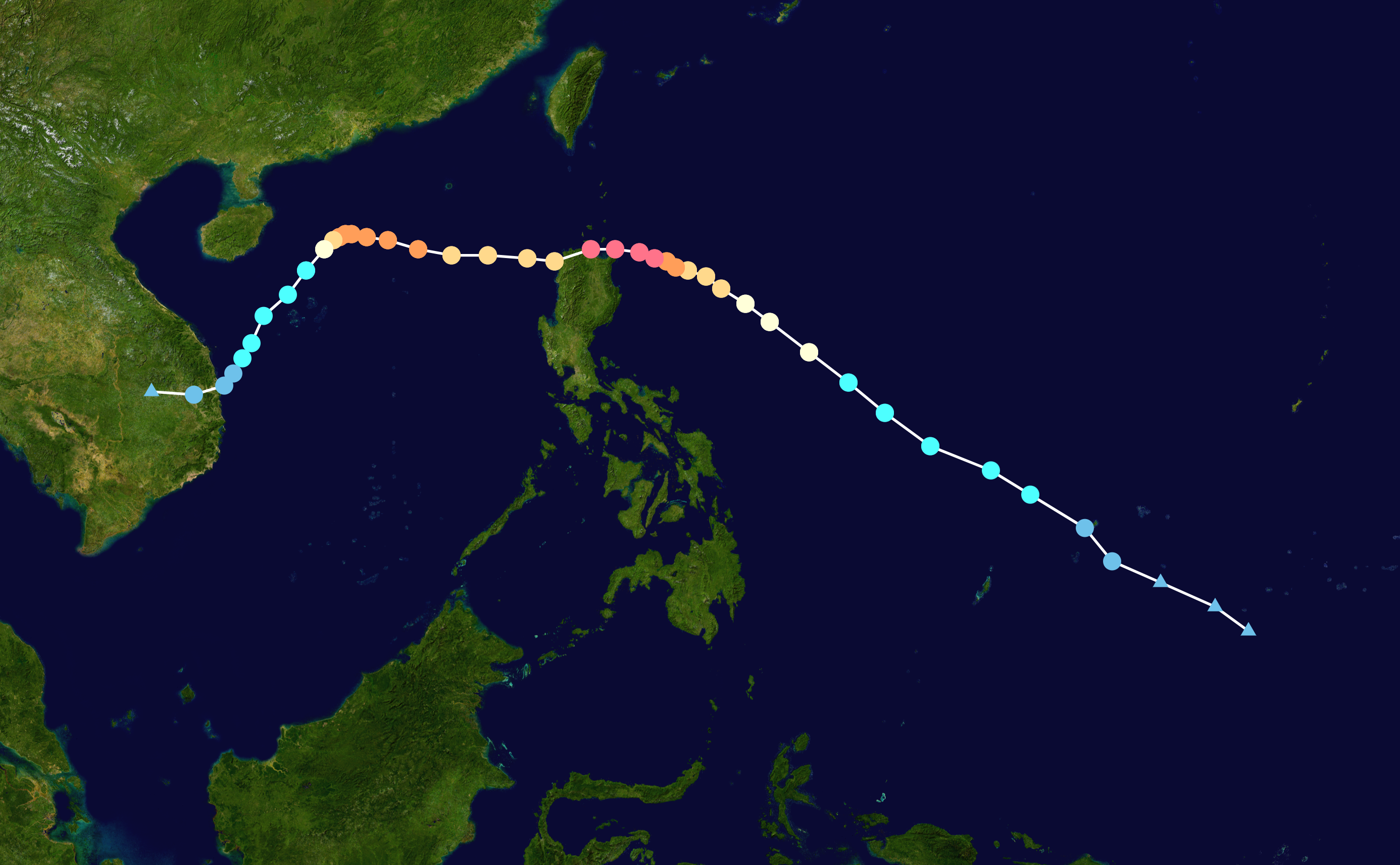
- Duration: November 2 – November 12
- Peak intensity: 185 km/h (115 mph) (10-min); 945 hPa (mbar)

Yinxing emerged from an area of convection 494 km (307 mi) east of Yap, with satellite imagery showing the lower-level winds beginning to consolidate as the convective banding wrapped around the low-level circulation center on November 2. At 00:00 UTC the following day, the Japan Meteorological Agency (JMA) classified the system as a tropical depression. Later that day, the JTWC designated the system as 24W due to its compact structure and a small burst of deep convection occurring near the circulation center. At 18:00 UTC the same day, the JMA upgraded the system to a tropical storm named Yinxing, as it exhibited improved convective banding tightly wrapping around the obscured LLCC.

On November 7, the JTWC reported that Yinxing peaked as a Category 4-equivalent super typhoon with 1-minute sustained winds of 240 km/h (150 mph), while the JMA estimated 10-minute sustained winds of 175 km/h (110 mph) and a minimum pressure of 940 hPa (27.76 inHg). Later that day, Yinxing made landfall in Santa Ana, Cagayan around 15:40 PHT (07:40 UTC). It later made a second landfall in Sanchez Mira, Cagayan after crossing the Babuyan Channel. After crossing Luzon, Yinxing weakened over the South China Sea due to land interaction, but briefly restrengthened before cooler waters and increasing wind shear caused gradual weakening. The JMA monitored the system until it dissipated on November 12.

=== Typhoon Man-yi (Pepito) ===
- Violent typhoon (JMA)
- Category 5 super typhoon (SSHWS)
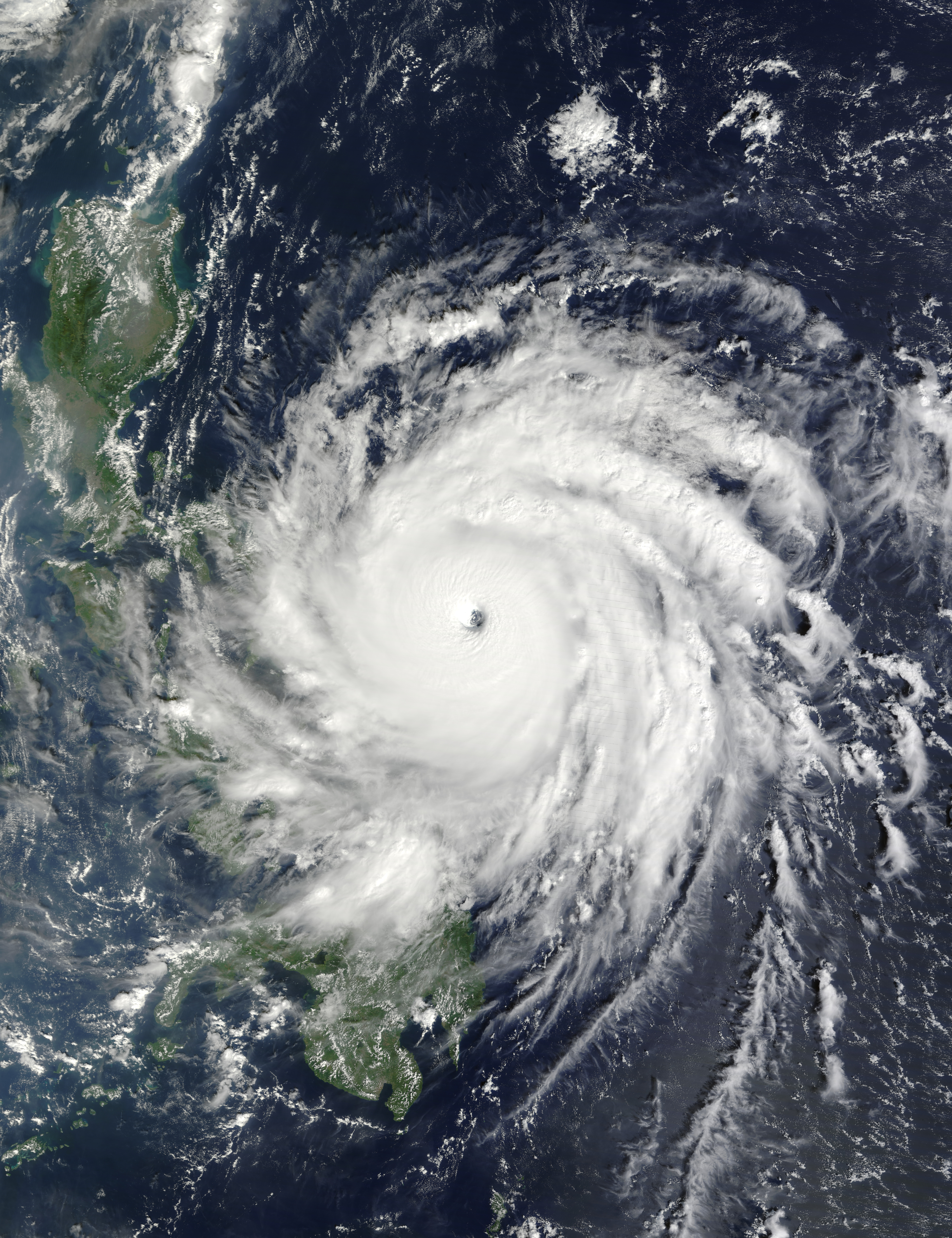
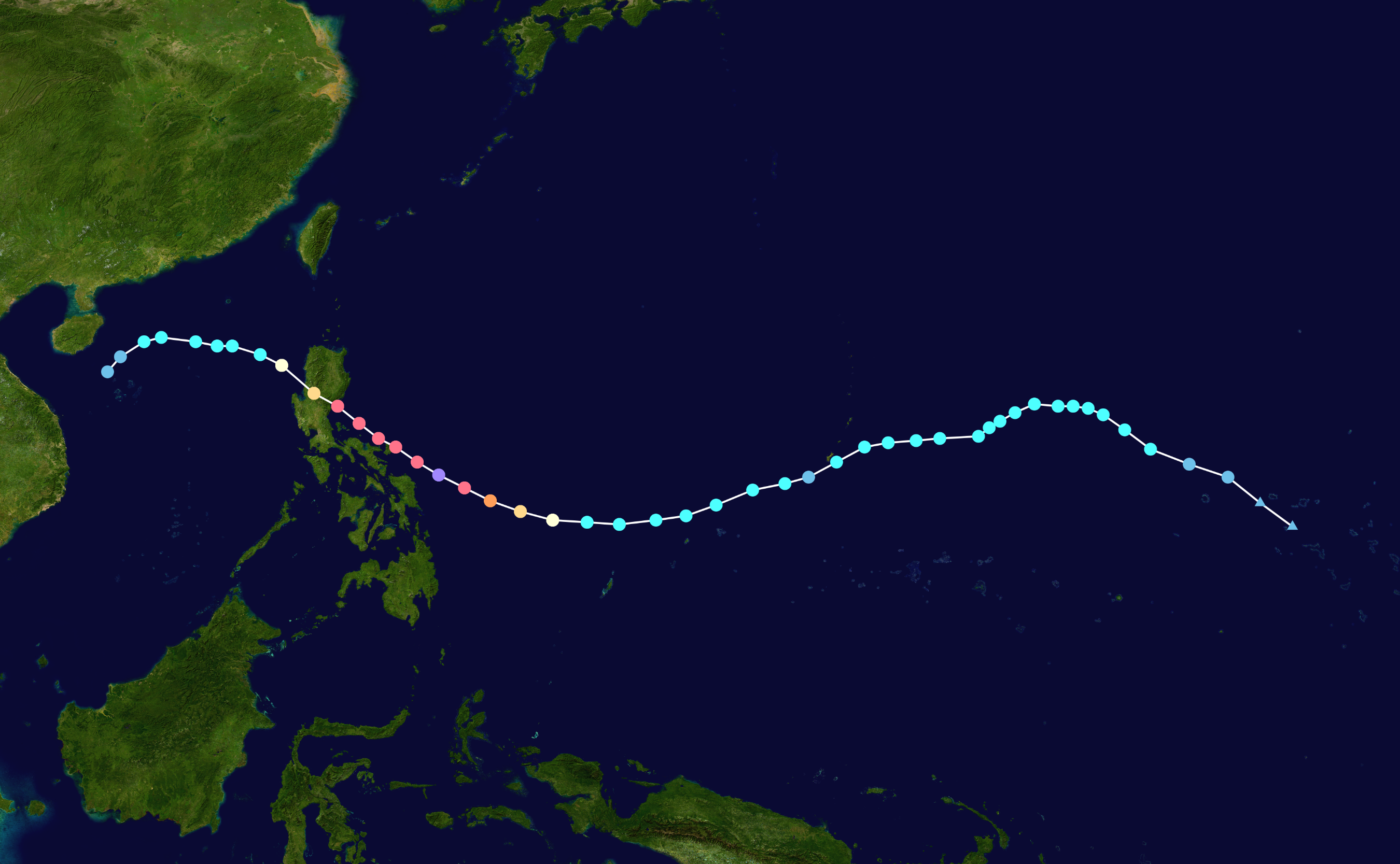
- Duration: November 7 – November 20
- Peak intensity: 195 km/h (120 mph) (10-min); 920 hPa (mbar)

Man-yi emerged from an area of convection 220 km (140 mi) east of Kwajalein Atoll, with satellite imagery showing a more organized low-level circulation center and a persistent area of deep convection on the southwestern periphery on November 8. The JMA designated the disturbance as a low-pressure area on the same day, and the next day, it was upgraded to a tropical depression. Later that same day, the JTWC assigned the system the designation 25W, noting that it was a consolidating system with formative bands wrapping in from the north. Moving northwestward, the JMA upgraded the system to a tropical storm named Man-yi at 06:00 UTC on the same day. The system became disorganized as it passed Guam on November 13.

Two days later, Man-yi began to strengthen whilst almost simultaneously being assigned the name Pepito by the PAGASA agency. Shortly after Man-yi began its intensification period, it was upgraded to a typhoon. Just one day later, the JTWC upgraded the system to super typhoon status, with estimated 1-minute maximum sustained winds of 260 km/h (160 mph), making it a Category 5-equivalent super typhoon. Meanwhile, the JMA upgraded Man-yi to a violent typhoon, estimating its peak intensity with a minimum central pressure of 920 hPa (27.17 inHg) and 10-minute maximum sustained winds of 195 km/h (120 mph). Man-yi made its first landfall in Panganiban, Catanduanes at around 9:40 PM PHT (13:40 UTC). After making landfall in Catanduanes, the system’s appearance slightly degraded as it passed north of the Calaguas Islands. The following day, Man-yi made its second landfall in Dipaculao, Aurora on Luzon Island at around 3:20 PM PHT (07:20 UTC) and quickly moved inland. Man-yi accelerated northwestward over the South China Sea, rapidly deteriorating as the storm experienced a low-level northeasterly cold surge and increased vertical wind shear. The JTWC issued its final warning on the same day as the system weakened to a tropical depression, while the JMA continued to monitor it until it was last noted at 06:00 UTC on November 20.

=== Typhoon Toraji (Nika) ===
- Typhoon (JMA)
- Category 1 typhoon (SSHWS)
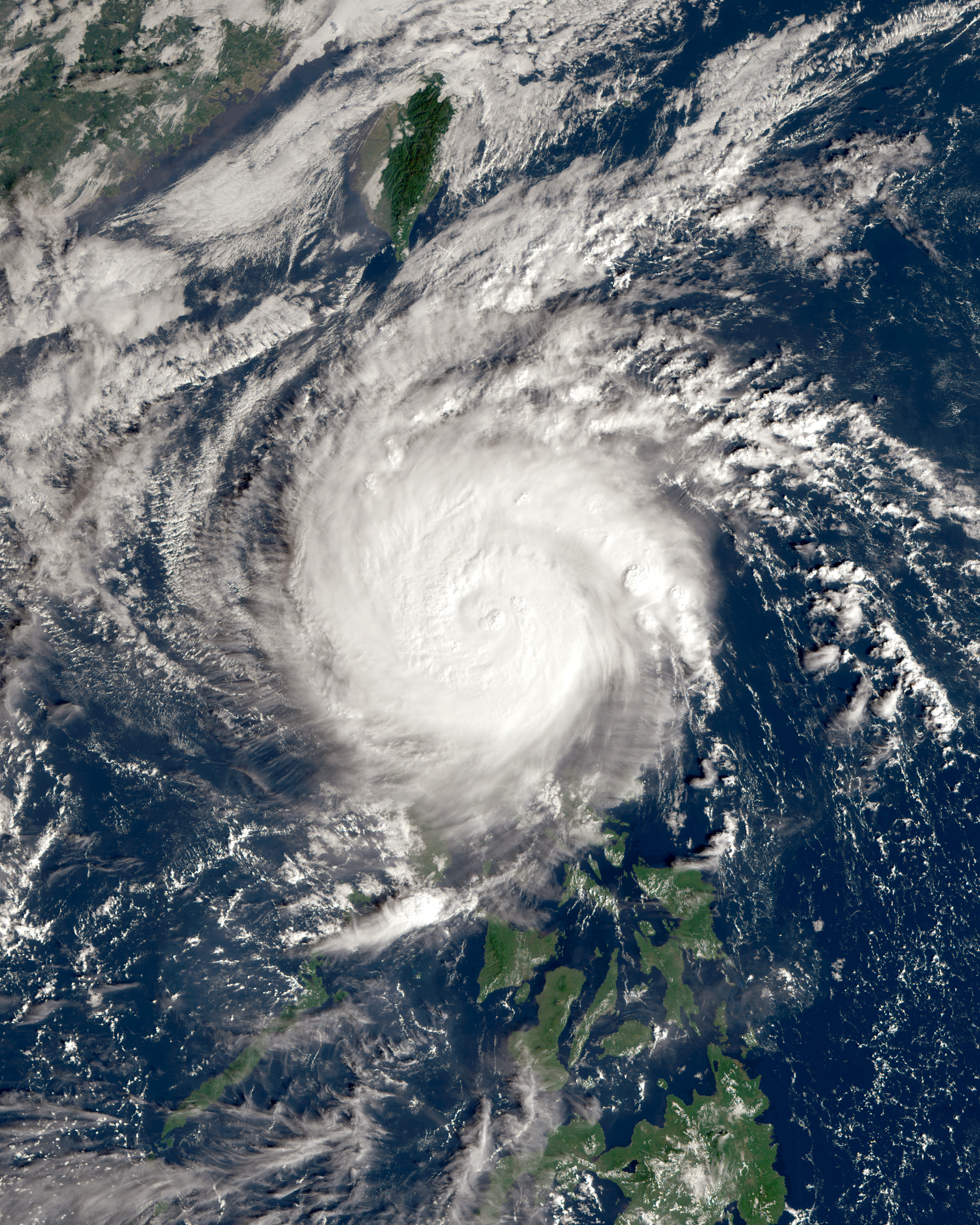
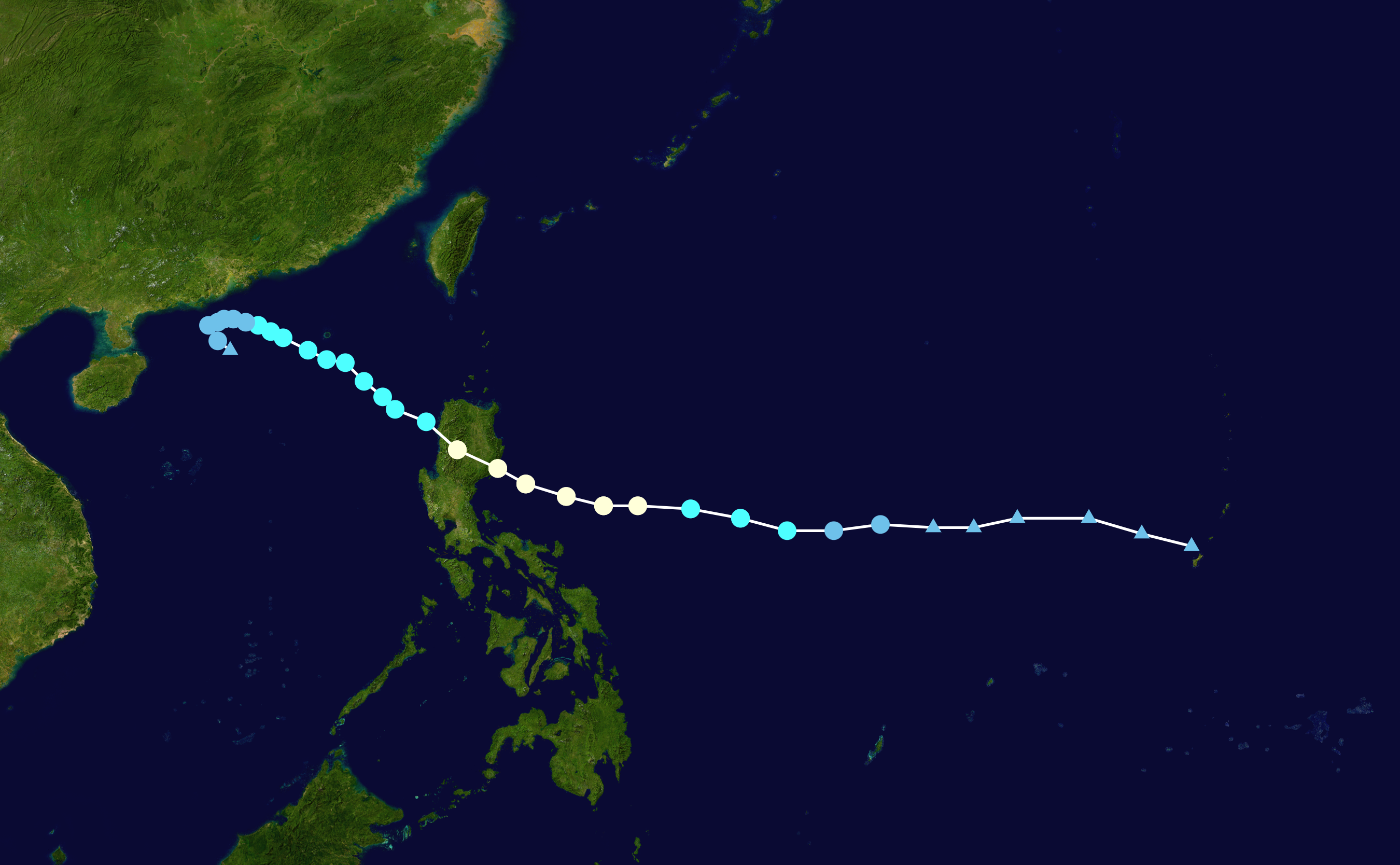
- Duration: November 8 – November 15
- Peak intensity: 130 km/h (80 mph) (10-min); 980 hPa (mbar)

On November 8, the JMA reported that a low-pressure area had formed 620 km (386 mi) north of Yap, Environmental analysis indicated a favorable environment for further development, with sea surface temperatures of 30–31 °C (86–88 °F), strong poleward outflow aloft, and low vertical wind shear. At 18:00 UTC on the same day, the JMA classified the system as a tropical depression. At 06:00 UTC the same day, the JMA upgraded the system to a tropical storm named Toraji, which the JTWC later designated as 26W. Satellite imagery shows that Toraji was undergoing rapid intensification, with a small system displaying an elongated, compact CDO feature, measuring around 81–92 miles (130–148 km) in diameter. A microwave imaging reveals a complete eyewall surrounding a small microwave eye feature, along with a deep convective band over the southern quadrant.

Early the next day, the JMA upgraded it to a severe tropical storm as it moved west-northwestward, with formative bands wrapping tighter around the obscured low-level circulation. At 09:00 UTC that day, the JTWC upgraded the storm to a minimal typhoon, noting a more asymmetric CDO in the eastern quadrant. Satellite imagery showed decreasing easterly vertical wind shear, allowing the CDO to become more symmetric and rebuild over the low-level circulation center. At 15:00 UTC, the JMA upgraded Toraji to a typhoon. On November 11, Toraji made landfall on Dilasag, Aurora, on Luzon Island at around 8:10 AM PHT (00:10 UTC), before rapidly weakening over mountainous terrain. Satellite imagery later showed weakening deep convection near the center due to strong southerly vertical wind shear as the storm became embedded in low-level northeasterly flow associated with a cold surge. The JMA monitored the system until it was last noted at 06:00 UTC on November 15.

=== Typhoon Usagi (Ofel) ===
- Very strong typhoon (JMA)
- Category 4 super typhoon (SSHWS)
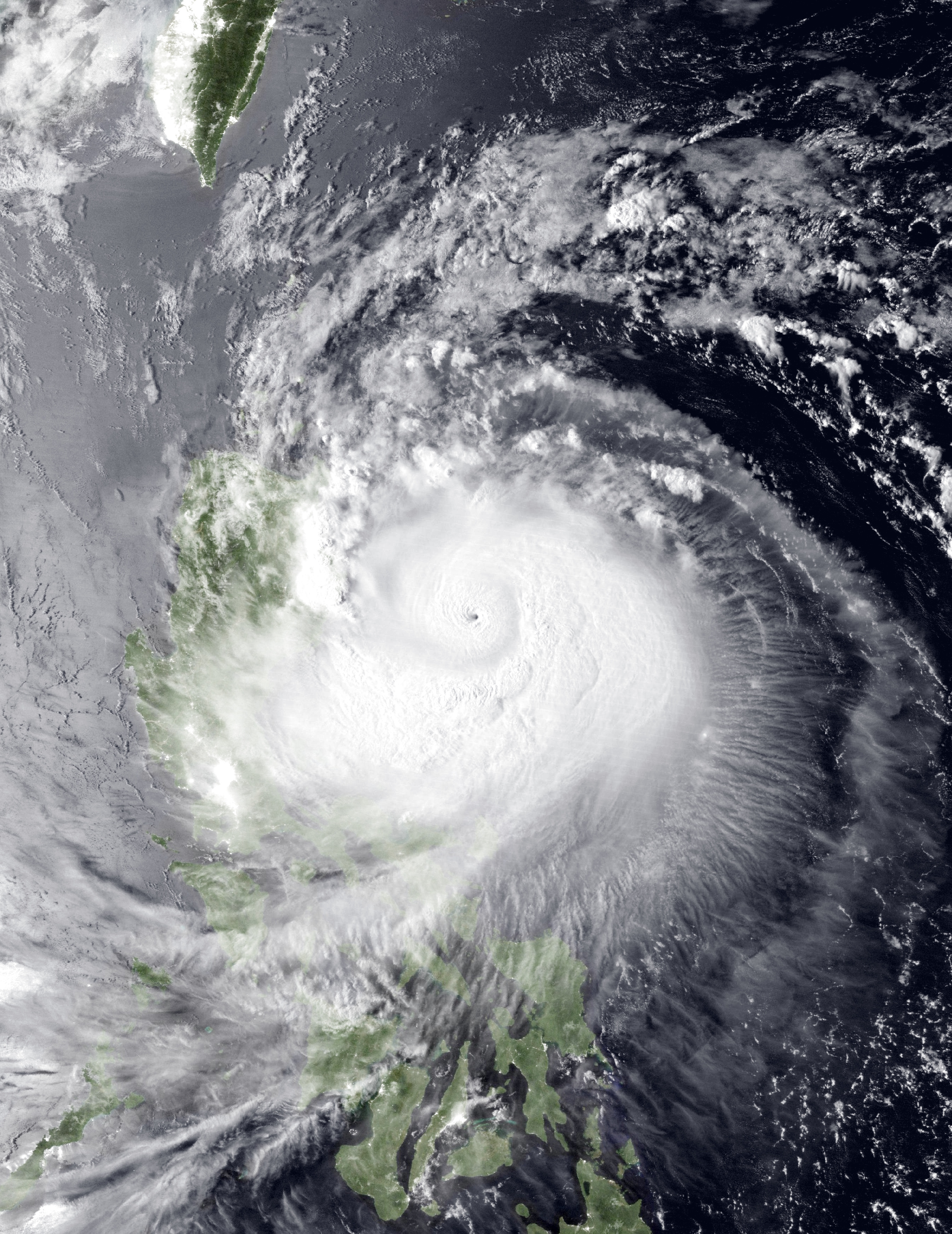
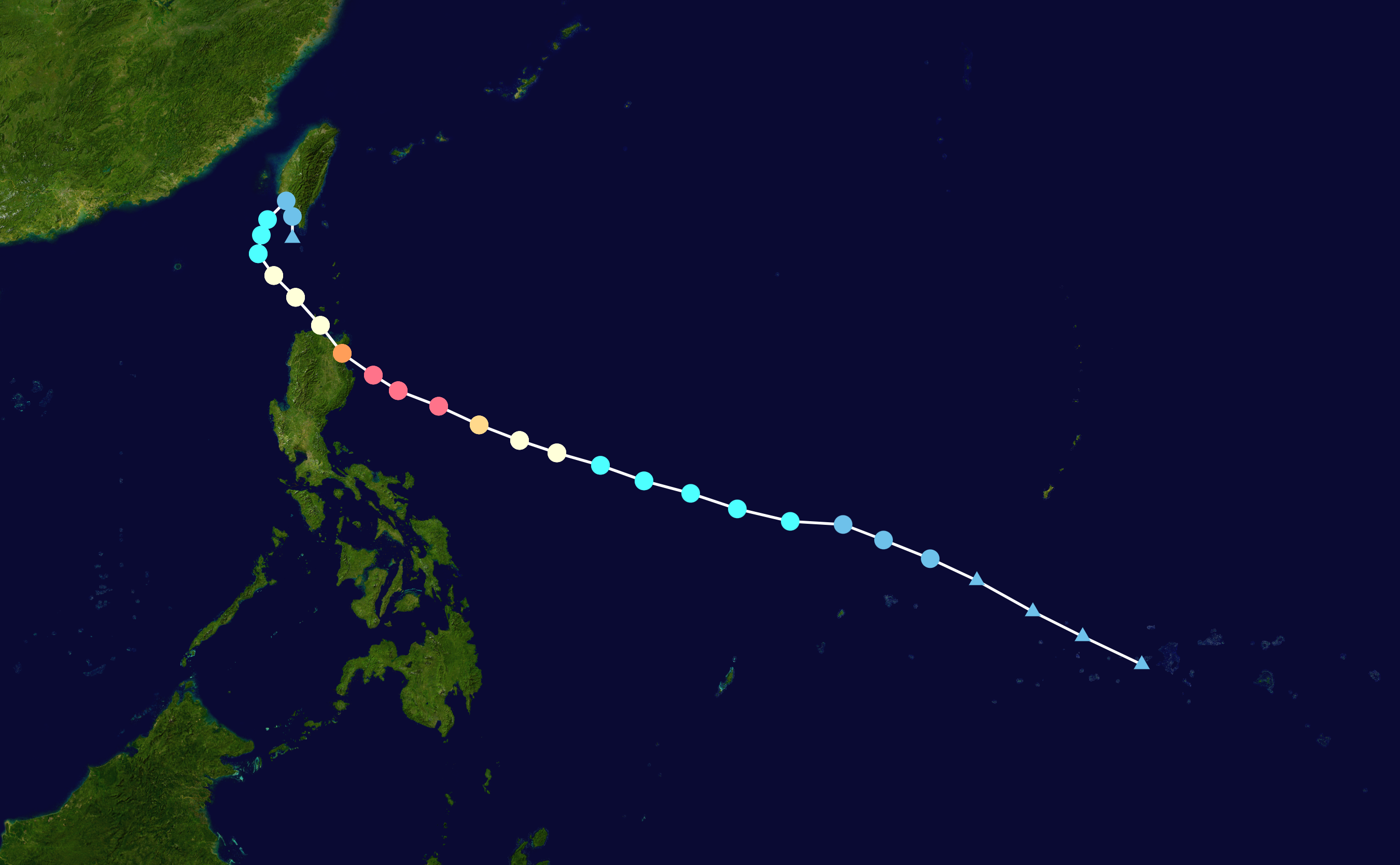
- Duration: November 9 – November 16
- Peak intensity: 175 km/h (110 mph) (10-min); 940 hPa (mbar)

Usagi emerged from an area of convection 494 km (307 mi) east of Chuuk, with satellite imagery showing a broad area of persistent convection that began to consolidate on November 8. At 12:00 UTC the following day, the JMA classified the system as a tropical depression, citing a favorable environment for development, with low to moderate vertical wind shear, moderate divergence aloft, and warm sea surface temperatures. The next day, the JTWC designated the system as 27W as it became a depression off the northeast coast of Luzon. At 18:00 UTC of November 10, the JMA upgraded the system to a tropical storm and named it Usagi; it then moved into the Philippine Area of Responsibility, where PAGASA named it Ofel. On November 12, both the JMA and the JTWC upgraded the system to a minimal typhoon, as it exhibited well-defined of well-defined convective banding tightly wrapping around an obscured LLCC.

On November 13, the JTWC reported that the system had peaked as a Category 4-equivalent super typhoon after Usagi attained 1-minute sustained winds of 240 km/h (150 mph) and a central pressure of 940 hPa (27.76 inHg). Usagi made landfall in Baggao, Cagayan, on Luzon Island at around 1:30 PM PHT (05:30 UTC) on November 14. After crossing northern Luzon, Usagi emerged into the Babuyan Channel, passing close to the Babuyan Islands and northern Cagayan. This later announced that the JMA would downgrade the system to a severe tropical storm. Usagi weakened significantly due to increasing wind shear as it neared Taiwan. Afterward, the JMA continued to track the system until it dissipated at 12:00 UTC on the same day.

=== Tropical Depression Querubin ===
- Tropical depression (JMA)
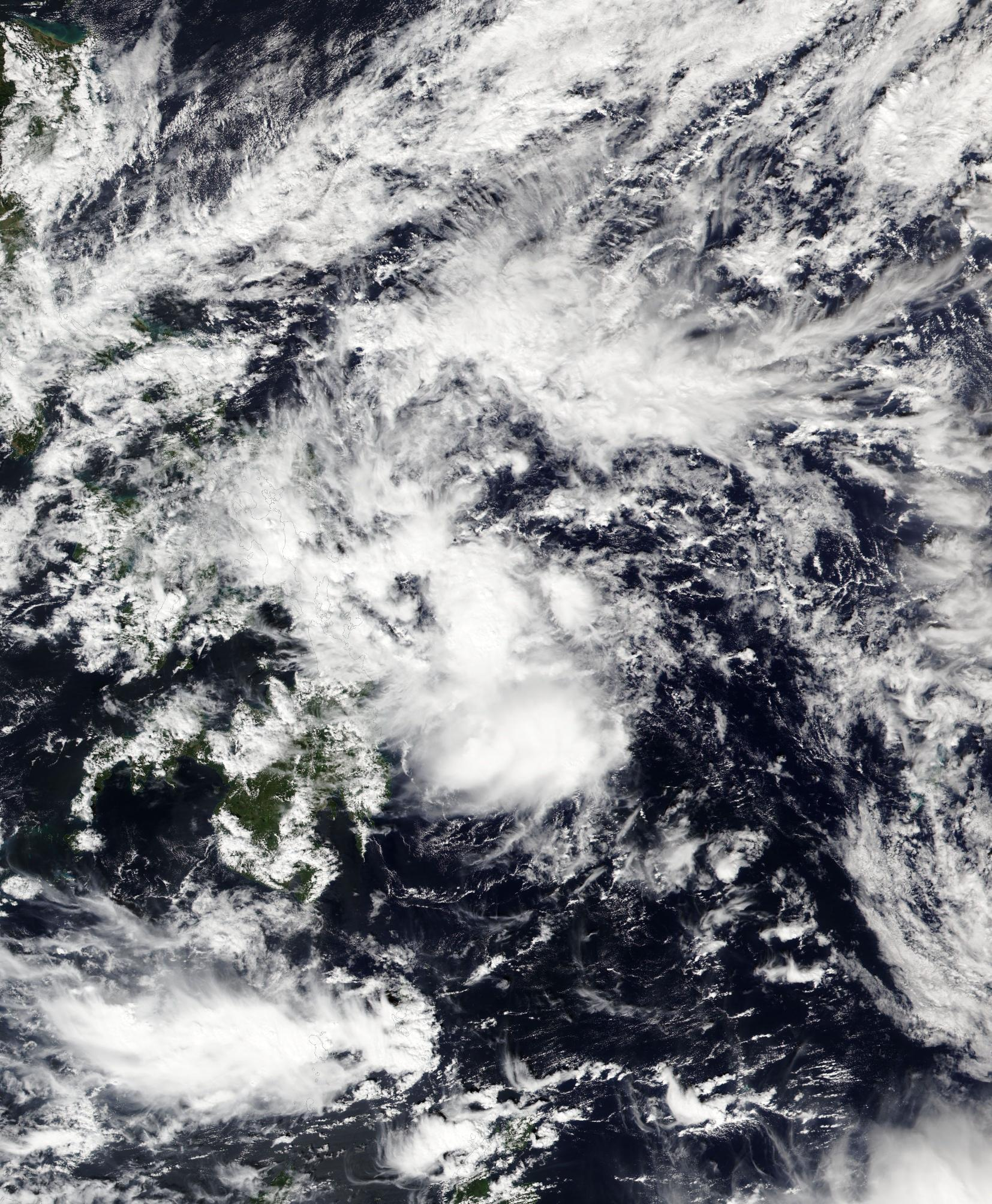
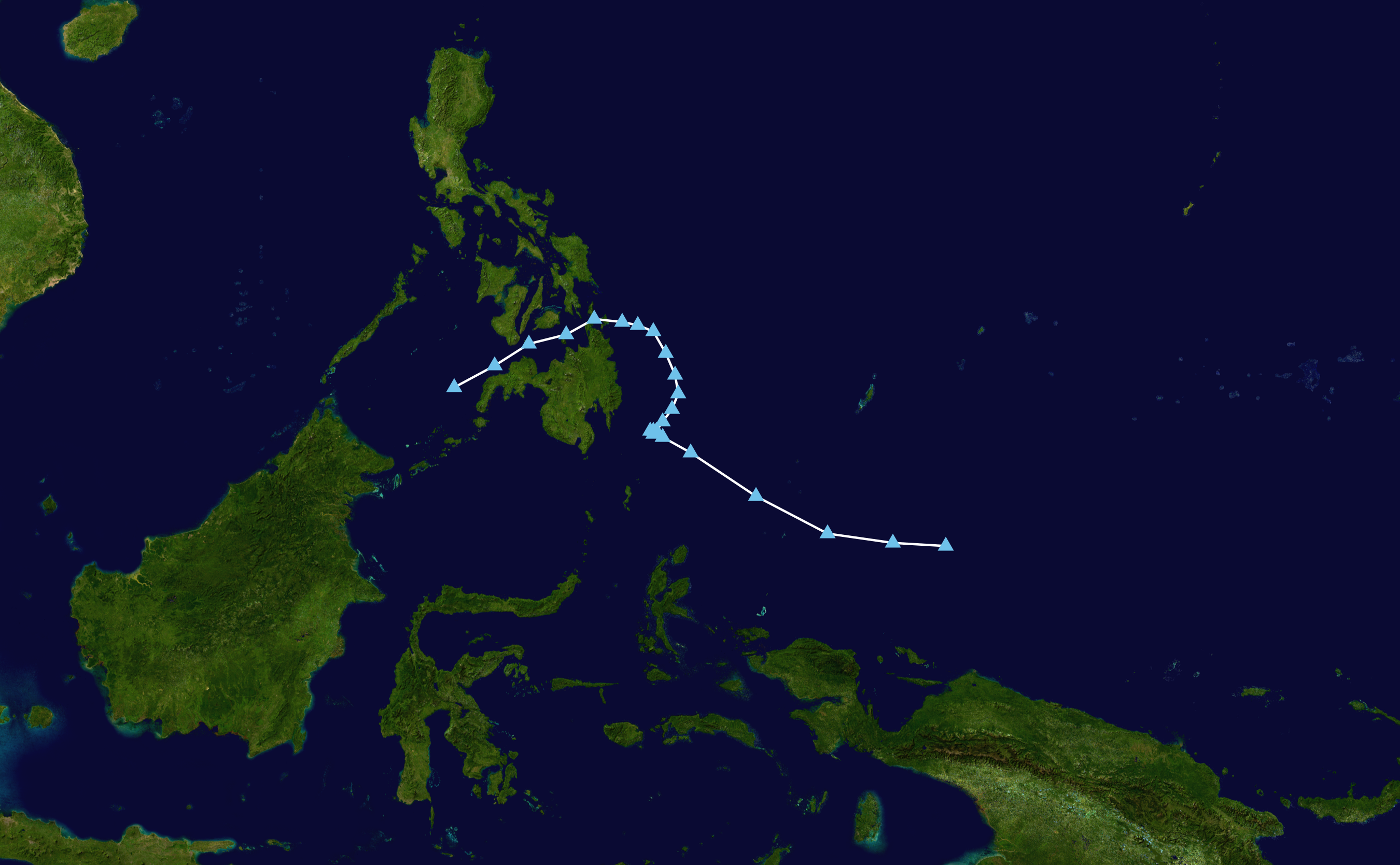
- Duration: December 17 – December 19
- Peak intensity: 55 km/h (35 mph) (10-min); 1004 hPa (mbar)

After a month of inactivity, at 15:00 UTC on December 16, the Joint Typhoon Warning Center issued a Tropical Cyclone Formation Alert, designating the system as Invest 96W. The next day, it became a depression and entered the Philippine Area of Responsibility, which PAGASA named Querubin, a replacement name for Quinta. On 17:00 PHT (09:00 UTC), PAGASA declared Signal No. 1 to Davao Oriental. Six hours later, the JTWC issued a TCFA to Querubin, citing that it will strengthen for the next couple of days. Satellite imagery shows the banding organizing, with Querubin inside a favorable environment. At 11:00 PHT (03:00 UTC) in December 18, PAGASA also placed Signal No. 1 in Surigao del Sur. At 17:00 PHT (09:00 UTC), PAGASA downgraded it to a low pressure area. On 13:00 UTC, JTWC cancelled TCFA for the system. However, the agency reissued it for the second time on 19:30 UTC, citing a high chance of formation of a tropical cyclone. Later that day JTWC cancelled the TCFA and downgraded it to a low chance before dissipated. Its remnants' energy later re-formed into Pabuk.

=== Tropical Storm Pabuk (Romina) ===
- Tropical storm (JMA)
- Tropical depression (SSHWS)
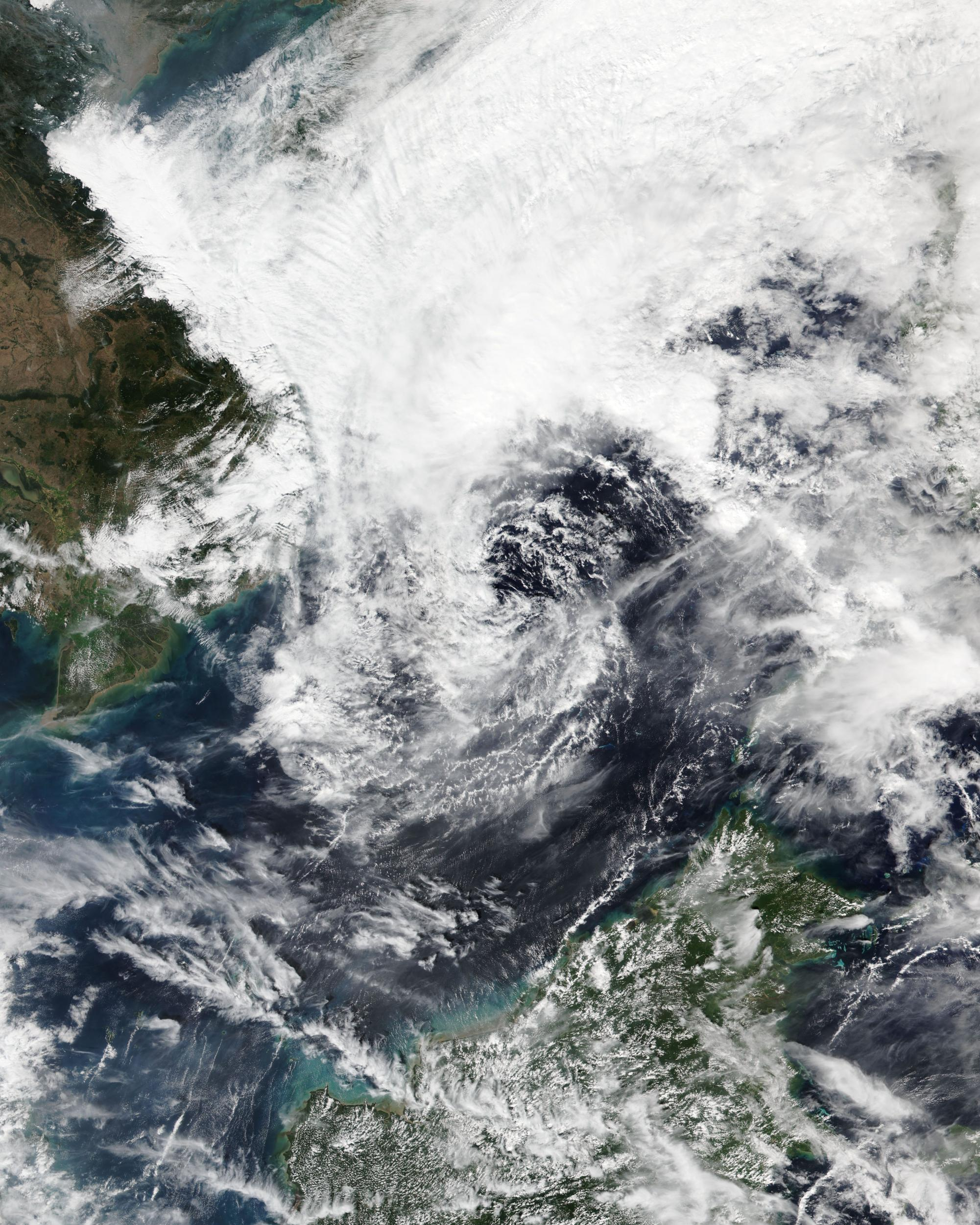
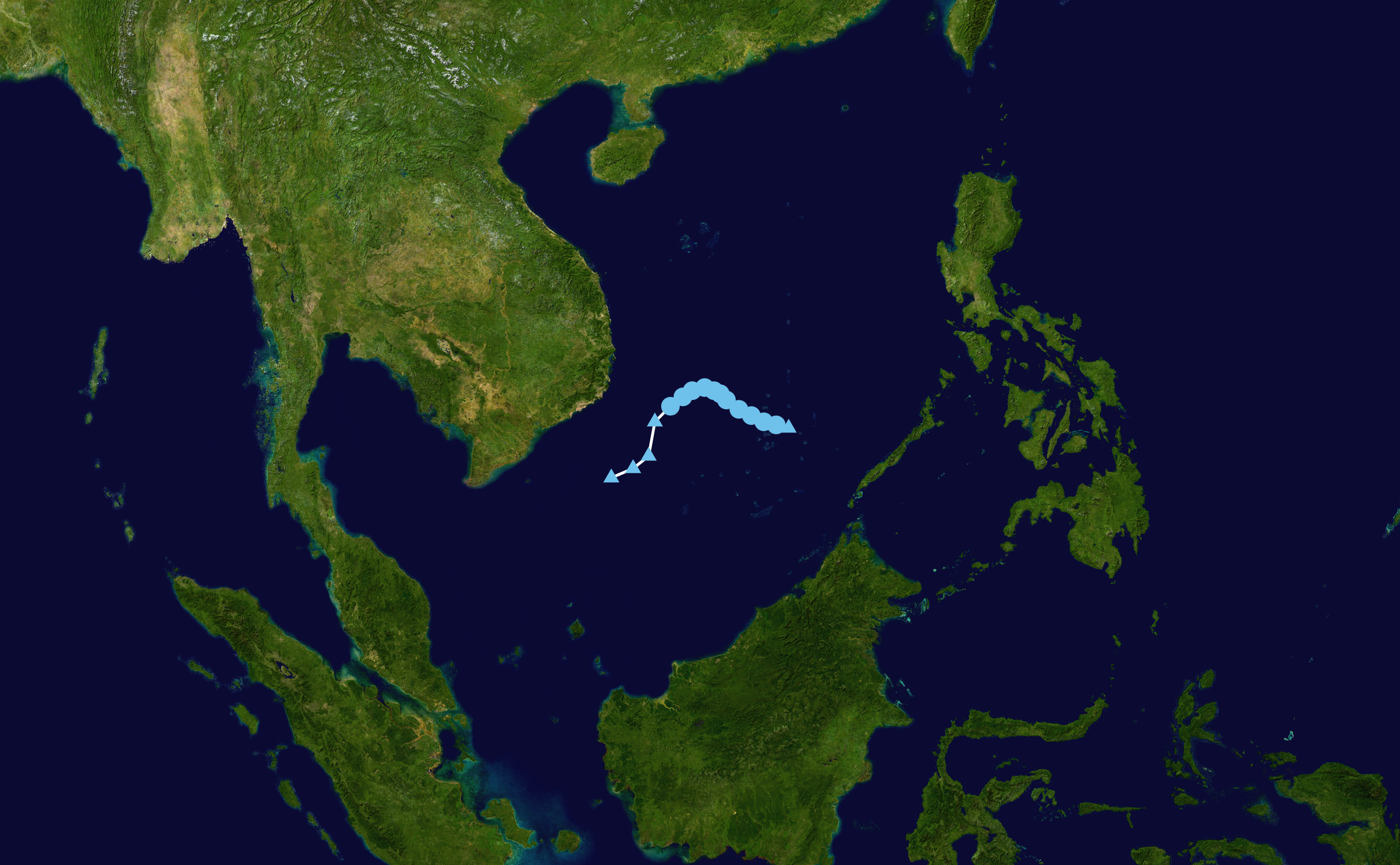
- Duration: December 21 – December 25
- Peak intensity: 65 km/h (40 mph) (10-min); 1000 hPa (mbar)

On December 20, the JMA reported a low-pressure area located 460 km (290 mi) west-southwest of Brunei, which was later upgraded to a tropical depression. At 06:00 UTC the following day, the JTWC issued a TCFA, noting that formative banding was organizing around the circulation and deep convection was building over the center. However, due to its imminent threat to the Kalayaan Islands, PAGASA named the depression Romina, a replacement name for Rolly, even though it was still outside the PAR, at 11:00 PHT (03:00 UTC) on December 22, and began issuing advisories on it. Later that same day, the JTWC assigned the system the designation 28W, noting a strong northeast surge was occurring with winds shifting from north-northeasterly to northerly, while Invest 98W, which had formed near the storm, rapidly weakened and was absorbed into the storm's southeastern periphery. Pabuk showed deep convection flaring on the northwestern periphery of a low-level circulation that was mostly exposed. On December 23, PAGASA issued its final advisory on Romina as it moved away from the Kalayaan Islands and lifted the wind signals.

On 06:00 UTC, the JMA upgraded the storm to a tropical storm and named it Pabuk, following the observation of a favorable environment as it moved westward along the southern periphery of a mid-level subtropical high. Pabuk moved westward and turned toward Vietnam as it lost its vertical structure, steered by the low-level flow associated with a northeasterly cold surge along the eastern coast of Vietnam. The system was last noted by the JMA on 18:00 UTC of December 25.

=== Other systems ===
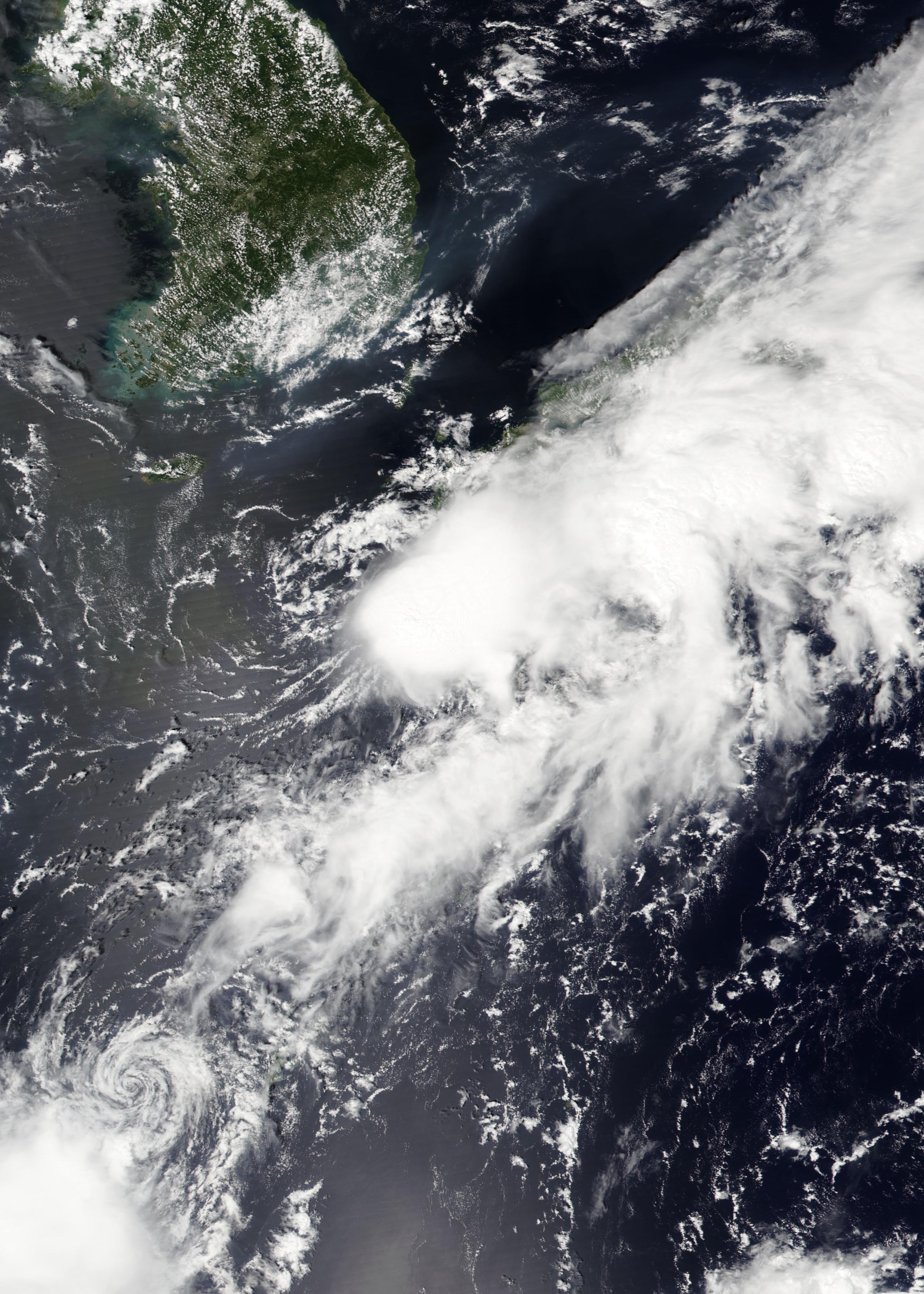
A tropical depression formed on August 19 just beside Tropical Storm Jongdari

- On August 18, the JMA reported the formation of a low-pressure area over the Philippine Sea. The next day, it was designated as a tropical depression but weakened to a low-pressure area by August 22. The following day, the JMA re-designated it as a tropical depression as it turned southward. Over the next few days, the depression gradually moved southwestward while Typhoon Shanshan approached Japan from the west. The JMA continued to monitor the depression until it dissipated on August 26.
- The remnants of Hurricane Hone entered the basin but was not detected by JMA. It did not last long and dissipated near Wake Island.
- A tropical depression briefly formed south of South Korea on August 19 and was last noted by the JMA at 18:00 UTC as it moved northward.
- A tropical depression briefly developed southeast of Japan on August 20. Thereafter, it was designated as an extratropical low while drifting southeastward.
- A tropical depression briefly formed southeast of Typhoon Shanshan on August 30 and was last noted by the JMA at 18:00 UTC.
- A tropical depression formed over the Philippine Sea on September 4. Two days later, it degenerated into a low-pressure area as it slowly turned to the west. On September 9, it re-strengthened back into a tropical depression as it moved west-northwest towards Eastern China where it made landfall before dissipating.
- On September 25, the JTWC marked a subtropical storm near Tokyo and designated it with an invest tag 96W, stating the system has a low chance of transitioning to a tropical system. The next day, the agency last noted the system as it merged with a frontal boundary while moving to the east. The JMA did not recognize the system.
- A tropical depression formed west of Guam on September 26. The depression did not last long, dissipating the next day, with its remnants moving northwards across the Philippine Sea.
- Another tropical depression formed west of Guam on October 6. The depression moved eastwards as it interacted with a nearby tropical depression that would later become Tropical Storm Barijat. The JMA last noted it the next day as the depression became embedded in the latter's circulation.
- A tropical depression formed in northeast of Mukojima on October 12. JTWC classified it as a subtropical depression on October 13. JTWC upgraded it into a subtropical storm on October 14. At the same time, JMA declared the system had transitioned to a developing extratropical low.
- A tropical depression formed north of Micronesia on October 16. The depression did not last long, and JMA downgraded the system into a low pressure area the next day.

== Storm names ==
Within the basin, both the Japan Meteorological Agency (JMA) and the Philippine Atmospheric, Geophysical and Astronomical Services Administration (PAGASA) assign names to tropical cyclones that develop in the Western Pacific, which can result in a tropical cyclone having two names. The Japan Meteorological Agency's RSMC Tokyo — Typhoon Center assigns international names to tropical cyclones on behalf of the World Meteorological Organization's Typhoon Committee when they have 10-minute sustained winds of 65 km/h (40 mph).

PAGASA names tropical cyclones which are active in their area of responsibility located between 135°E and 115°E and between 5°N and 25°N even if the cyclone has already been named. If the list of names for the Philippine region are exhausted, then names will be taken from an auxiliary list of which the first ten are published each season. Unused names are marked in gray. The names of significant tropical cyclones were retired by both PAGASA and the Typhoon Committee in the spring of 2025.

=== International names ===
During the season, 26 tropical storms developed in the Western Pacific and all of them were named by the JMA once they had 10-minute sustained winds of 65 km/h (40 mph). The JMA selected the names from a list of 140 names, that had been developed by the 14 members nations and territories of the ESCAP/WMO Typhoon Committee. During the season, the names Pulasan, Krathon and Yinxing were used for the first (and only, in the case of Krathon) time after they replaced Rumbia, Mangkhut and Yutu, which were retired following the 2018 season.

Ewiniar	Maliksi	Gaemi	Prapiroon	Maria	Son-Tinh	Ampil	Wukong	Jongdari	Shanshan	Yagi	Leepi	Bebinca
Pulasan	Soulik	Cimaron	Jebi	Krathon	Barijat	Trami	Kong-rey	Yinxing	Toraji	Man-yi	Usagi	Pabuk

==== Retirement ====
At their 57th Session in February 2025, the ESCAP/WMO Typhoon Committee announced that the names Ewiniar, Yagi, Krathon, Trami, Kong-rey, Toraji, Man-yi, and Usagi would be removed from the naming lists due to the number of deaths and amount of damages each one caused, and they will not be used again for another typhoon name. Additionally, the name Jebi was also retired due to its similar pronunciation to the derogatory word in Croatian. In 2026, they were replaced by Tirou, Tomo, Narae, Burapha, Hoaban, Koki, Gaeguri, Dim-sum, and Hebi respectively.

=== Philippines ===
Main list
Aghon	Butchoy	Carina	Dindo	Enteng
Ferdie	Gener	Helen	Igme	Julian
Kristine	Leon	Marce	Nika	Ofel
Pepito	Querubin	Romina	Siony (unused)	Tonyo (unused)
Upang (unused)	Vicky (unused)	Warren (unused)	Yoyong (unused)	Zosimo (unused)
Auxiliary list
Alakdan (unused)	Baldo (unused)	Clara (unused)	Dencio (unused)	Estong (unused)
Felipe (unused)	Gomer (unused)	Heling (unused)	Ismael (unused)	Julio (unused)

During the season, PAGASA used its own naming scheme for the 18 tropical cyclones, that either developed within or moved into their self-defined area of responsibility. This is the same list used during the 2020 and are scheduled to be used again during 2028. All of the names are the same except Aghon, Querubin, Romina and Upang which replaced the names Ambo, Quinta, Rolly and Ulysses after they were retired. The names Aghon, Querubin, and Romina were used for the first (and only, in the case of Aghon) time this year.

==== Retirement ====
On February 20, 2025, PAGASA announced that the names Aghon, Enteng, Julian, Kristine, Leon, Nika, Ofel, and Pepito would be retired from the naming list, as they all caused over ₱1 billion in damages to the Philippines, and they will not be used again. They were replaced with Amuyao, Edring, Josefa, Kidul, Lekep, Nanolay, Onos and Puwok respectively for the 2028 season.

With a total of eight names, this set a new record of names retired in a single season since the beginning of its current naming system in 2001.

== Season effects ==
This table summarizes all the systems that developed within or moved into the North Pacific Ocean, west of the International Date Line during 2024. The table also provide an overview of a system's intensity, duration, land areas affected, and any deaths or damages associated with the system.

Name	Dates	Peak intensity			Areas affected	Damage (USD)	Deaths	Ref(s).
Name	Dates	Category	Wind speed	Pressure	Areas affected	Damage (USD)	Deaths	Ref(s).
Ewiniar (Aghon)	May 23–30	Typhoon	140 km/h (85 mph)	970 hPa (28.64 inHg)	Philippines, Japan, Alaska	$17.7 million	6	
Maliksi	May 30–June 2	Tropical storm	65 km/h (40 mph)	998 hPa (29.47 inHg)	South China, Taiwan	Unknown	None	
03W	July 13–15	Tropical depression	55 km/h (35 mph)	1000 hPa (29.53 inHg)	Vietnam, Laos, Thailand	None	None	
Gaemi (Carina)	July 19–29	Very strong typhoon	165 km/h (105 mph)	935 hPa (27.61 inHg)	Philippines, Taiwan, Yaeyama Islands, East China, Indonesia, North Korea	$4.57 billion	152	
Prapiroon (Butchoy)	July 20–25	Severe tropical storm	100 km/h (65 mph)	985 hPa (29.09 inHg)	Philippines, Vietnam, South China, Laos, Thailand, Cambodia	$40.7 million	23	
Maria	August 5–14	Severe tropical storm	100 km/h (65 mph)	980 hPa (28.94 inHg)	Bonin Islands, Japan	$22.9 million	None	
Son-Tinh	August 10–14	Tropical storm	75 km/h (45 mph)	994 hPa (29.35 inHg)	Alaska	None	None	
Ampil	August 11–19	Very strong typhoon	155 km/h (100 mph)	950 hPa (28.05 inHg)	Bonin Islands, Japan, Alaska	Minimal	4	
Wukong	August 11–16	Tropical storm	65 km/h (40 mph)	1002 hPa (29.59 inHg)	None	None	None	
Jongdari (Dindo)	August 18–22	Tropical storm	75 km/h (45 mph)	996 hPa (29.41 inHg)	Miyako Islands, Yaeyama Islands, Korean Peninsula, Northeast China	$2.15 billion	28	
TD	August 19–26	Tropical depression	Not specified	1004 hPa (29.65 inHg)	None	None	None	
TD	August 19	Tropical depression	55 km/h (35 mph)	1004 hPa (29.65 inHg)	None	None	None	
TD	August 20	Tropical depression	Not specified	1012 hPa (29.88 inHg)	None	None	None	
Shanshan	August 20–September 1	Very strong typhoon	175 km/h (110 mph)	935 hPa (27.61 inHg)	Guam, Northern Mariana Islands, Japan, South Korea	≥$6 billion	8	
TD	August 30	Tropical depression	Not specified	1006 hPa (29.71 inHg)	Japan	None	None	
Yagi (Enteng)	August 31–September 9	Violent typhoon	195 km/h (120 mph)	915 hPa (27.02 inHg)	Palau, Philippines, South China, Hong Kong, Macau, Vietnam, Laos, Thailand, Myanmar	$14.7 billion	844	
Leepi	September 1–7	Tropical storm	65 km/h (40 mph)	1002 hPa (29.59 inHg)	None	None	None	
TD	September 4–12	Tropical depression	55 km/h (35 mph)	998 hPa (29.47 inHg)	Okinawa Prefecture, Taiwan, East China	None	None	
Bebinca (Ferdie)	September 9–18	Typhoon	140 km/h (85 mph)	965 hPa (28.50 inHg)	Guam, Northern Mariana Islands, Philippines, Ryukyu Islands, East China	$1.42 billion	8	
Pulasan (Helen)	September 15–21	Tropical storm	85 km/h (50 mph)	992 hPa (29.29 inHg)	Guam, Northern Mariana Islands, Philippines, East China, South Korea, Japan	$4.15 million	17	
Soulik (Gener)	September 15–20	Tropical storm	65 km/h (40 mph)	992 hPa (29.29 inHg)	Philippines, Vietnam, Laos, Thailand, Cambodia, Myanmar	$33.7 million	29	
17W (Igme)	September 20–22	Tropical depression	55 km/h (35 mph)	1002 hPa (29.59 inHg)	Philippines, Ryukyu Islands, Taiwan, East China	Unknown	None	
Cimaron	September 23–27	Tropical storm	65 km/h (40 mph)	998 hPa (29.47 inHg)	None	Unknown	None	
Jebi	September 25–October 2	Typhoon	120 km/h (75 mph)	980 hPa (28.94 inHg)	Guam, Northern Mariana Islands, Japan, Kuril Islands	Unknown	None	
TD	September 26–27	Tropical depression	Not specified	1006 hPa (29.71 inHg)	None	None	None	
Krathon (Julian)	September 26–October 3	Violent typhoon	195 km/h (120 mph)	920 hPa (27.17 inHg)	Philippines, Taiwan, Ryukyu Islands	>$48.1 million	18	
Barijat	October 4–11	Tropical storm	85 km/h (50 mph)	985 hPa (29.09 inHg)	Guam, Northern Mariana Islands, Kuril Islands, Kamchatka Peninsula	None	None	
TD	October 6–7	Tropical depression	Not specified	1006 hPa (29.71 inHg)	None	None	None	
TD	October 12–14	Tropical depression	55 km/h (35 mph)	1006 hPa (29.71 inHg)	None	None	None	
TD	October 16–17	Tropical depression	Not specified	1008 hPa (29.77 inHg)	None	None	None	
Trami (Kristine)	October 18–29	Severe tropical storm	110 km/h (70 mph)	970 hPa (28.64 inHg)	Palau, Philippines, Taiwan, South China, Vietnam, Laos, Cambodia, Thailand	$405 million	179	
Kong-rey (Leon)	October 24–November 1	Very strong typhoon	185 km/h (115 mph)	925 hPa (27.32 inHg)	Guam, Northern Mariana Islands, Philippines, Taiwan, East China, South Korea, Japan	$167 million	3	
Yinxing (Marce)	November 2–12	Very strong typhoon	185 km/h (115 mph)	945 hPa (27.91 inHg)	Caroline Islands, Philippines, South China, Vietnam, Cambodia	>$9.63 million	1	
Man-yi (Pepito)	November 7–20	Violent typhoon	195 km/h (120 mph)	920 hPa (27.17 inHg)	Guam, Northern Mariana Islands, Caroline Islands, Palau, Philippines, Taiwan, South China, Hong Kong, Macau	$65 million	14	
Toraji (Nika)	November 8–15	Typhoon	130 km/h (80 mph)	980 hPa (28.94 inHg)	Philippines, South China, Taiwan, Hong Kong, Macau	$7.76 million	4	
Usagi (Ofel)	November 9–16	Very strong typhoon	175 km/h (110 mph)	940 hPa (27.76 inHg)	Philippines, Taiwan	$9.56 million	None	
Querubin	December 17–19	Tropical depression	55 km/h (35 mph)	1004 hPa (29.65 inHg)	Philippines	None	None	
Pabuk (Romina)	December 21–25	Tropical storm	65 km/h (40 mph)	1000 hPa (29.53 inHg)	East Malaysia, Philippines, Vietnam	$9.91 million	4	
Season aggregates
38 systems	May 23 – December 25		195 km/h (120 mph)	915 hPa (27.02 inHg)		$29.7 billion	1336	

== See also ==
- Weather of 2024
- Tropical cyclones in 2024
- Pacific typhoon season
- 2024 Atlantic hurricane season
- 2024 Pacific hurricane season
- 2024 North Indian Ocean cyclone season
- South-West Indian Ocean cyclone seasons: 2023–24, 2024–25
- Australian region cyclone seasons: 2023–24, 2024–25
- South Pacific cyclone seasons: 2023–24, 2024–25
