= Typhoon Shanshan (2024) =

Pacific typhoon

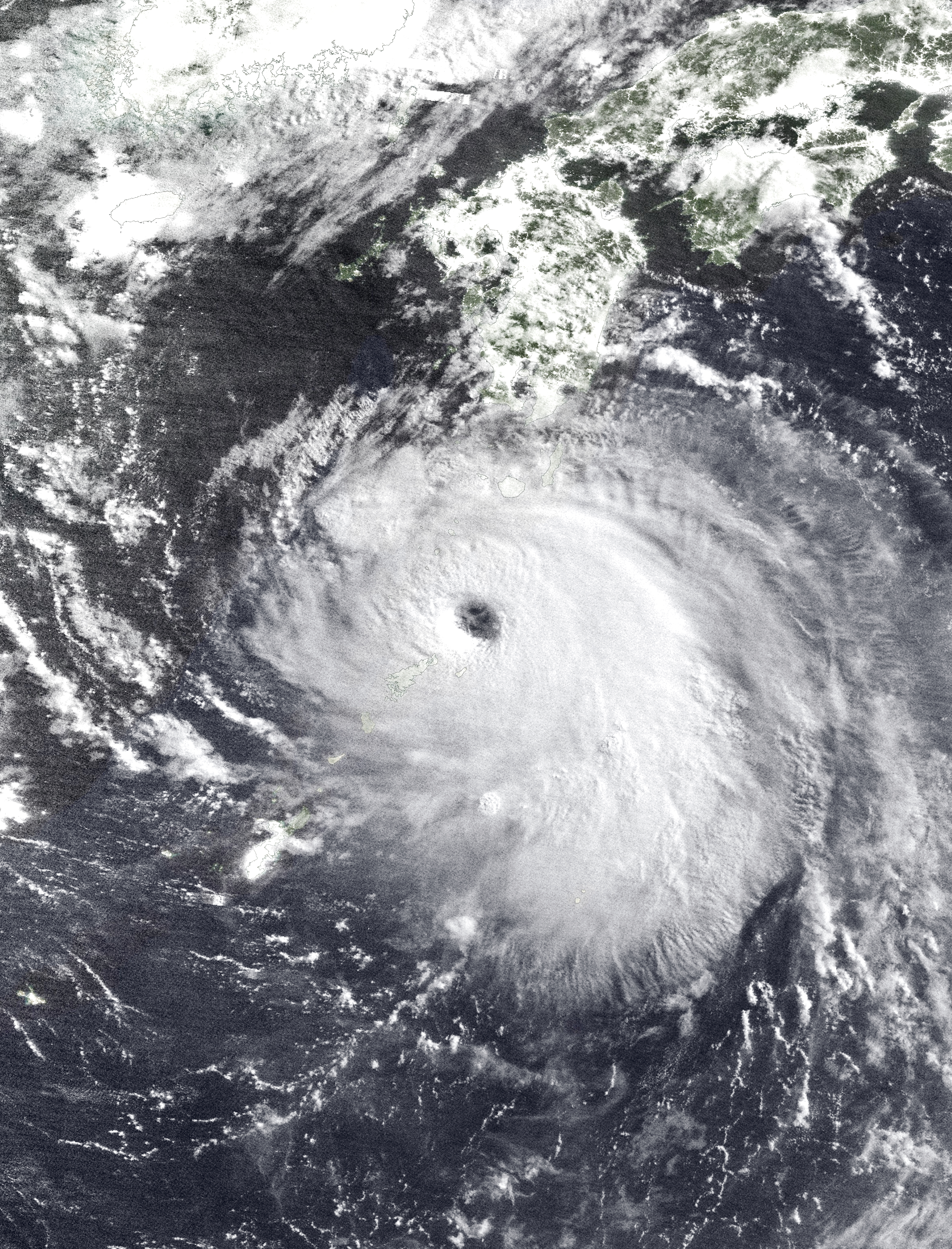
- Shanshan during its peak intensity over the Ryukyu Islands on August 27

Meteorological history
- Formed: August 20, 2024
- Dissipated: September 1, 2024

Very strong typhoon
- 10-minute sustained (JMA)
- Highest winds: 175 km/h (110 mph)
- Lowest pressure: 935 hPa (mbar); 27.61 inHg

Category 4-equivalent typhoon
- 1-minute sustained (SSHWS/JTWC)
- Highest winds: 215 km/h (130 mph)
- Lowest pressure: 932 hPa (mbar); 27.52 inHg

Overall effects
- Fatalities: 8
- Injuries: 127
- Damage: ≥$6 billion (2024 USD)
- Areas affected: Japan, South Korea
- IBTrACS /
- Part of the 2024 Pacific typhoon season

Typhoon Shanshan (Note: The name Shanshan (Cantonese: 珊珊, [saːn˥ saːn˥]) was contributed by Hong Kong and is a feminine given nickname meaning "sparkling" in Cantonese and was also named after Lee Lai-shan, commemorating the first athlete to win an Olympic medal representing Hong Kong.) was a powerful and costly tropical cyclone that moved through Japan in late August 2024. The tenth named storm and fourth typhoon of the annual typhoon season, Shanshan was first noted near the Mariana Islands on August 20, with deep convection beginning to consolidate. The following day, the Japan Meteorological Agency (JMA) upgraded it to a tropical storm and named it Shanshan. Early the next day, both the JMA and the Joint Typhoon Warning Center (JTWC) classified it as a minimal typhoon. Shanshan turned west-northwestward and stalled near Kikaijima, reaching its peak intensity with ten-minute sustained winds of 175 km/h (110 mph) and a central pressure of 935 hPa (27.61 inHg).

It then peaked at Category 4-equivalent intensity on the Saffir–Simpson scale on August 27, with one-minute sustained winds of 215 km/h (130 mph). As the typhoon moved through the Ryukyu Islands, it further decayed, becoming cooler and less defined. Shanshan turned northward between two mid-level subtropical ridges and made landfall near Satsumasendai in Kagoshima Prefecture around 8 a.m. local time on August 29. It then turned eastward along the northern edge of a subtropical high and quickly crossed the Seto Inland Sea before making landfall over the northern tip of Shikoku on August 30. Shanshan's convection has slightly increased over the past six hours as its circulation moved back over open water and began progressing east-southeastward due to interaction with a mid-latitude trough. It then moved inland over Japan and dissipated on September 1.

After Tropical Storm Maria and Typhoon Ampil impacted Japan, Shanshan arrived a few days later. In preparation for Shanshan, storm warnings were issued for 14 communities in the Satsuma and Ōsumi areas of Kagoshima Prefecture, and on August 28, the JMA issued special weather warnings for Kagoshima Prefecture. This was the first emergency warning issued for Kagoshima Prefecture since Typhoon Nanmadol in 2022. As Shanshan brushed the islands of Amami Ōshima and Kikaijima, maximum sustained wind gusts near 100 miles per hour (160 km/h) were recorded at Kikai Airport on the latter island. The JMA began issuing landslide and rockslide warnings in Kagoshima, Miyazaki, and Shizuoka prefectures. As Shanshan moved ashore in Kyushu, a wind gust of 85 miles per hour (137 km/h) was recorded in Makurazaki, Kagoshima. Meanwhile, heavy rainfall from Shanshan affected the South Korean island of Jeju. In all, the typhoon killed at least eight people, injured 127 others, and damaged hundreds of structures throughout Japan. Damages are estimated at US$6–10 billion.

== Meteorological history ==
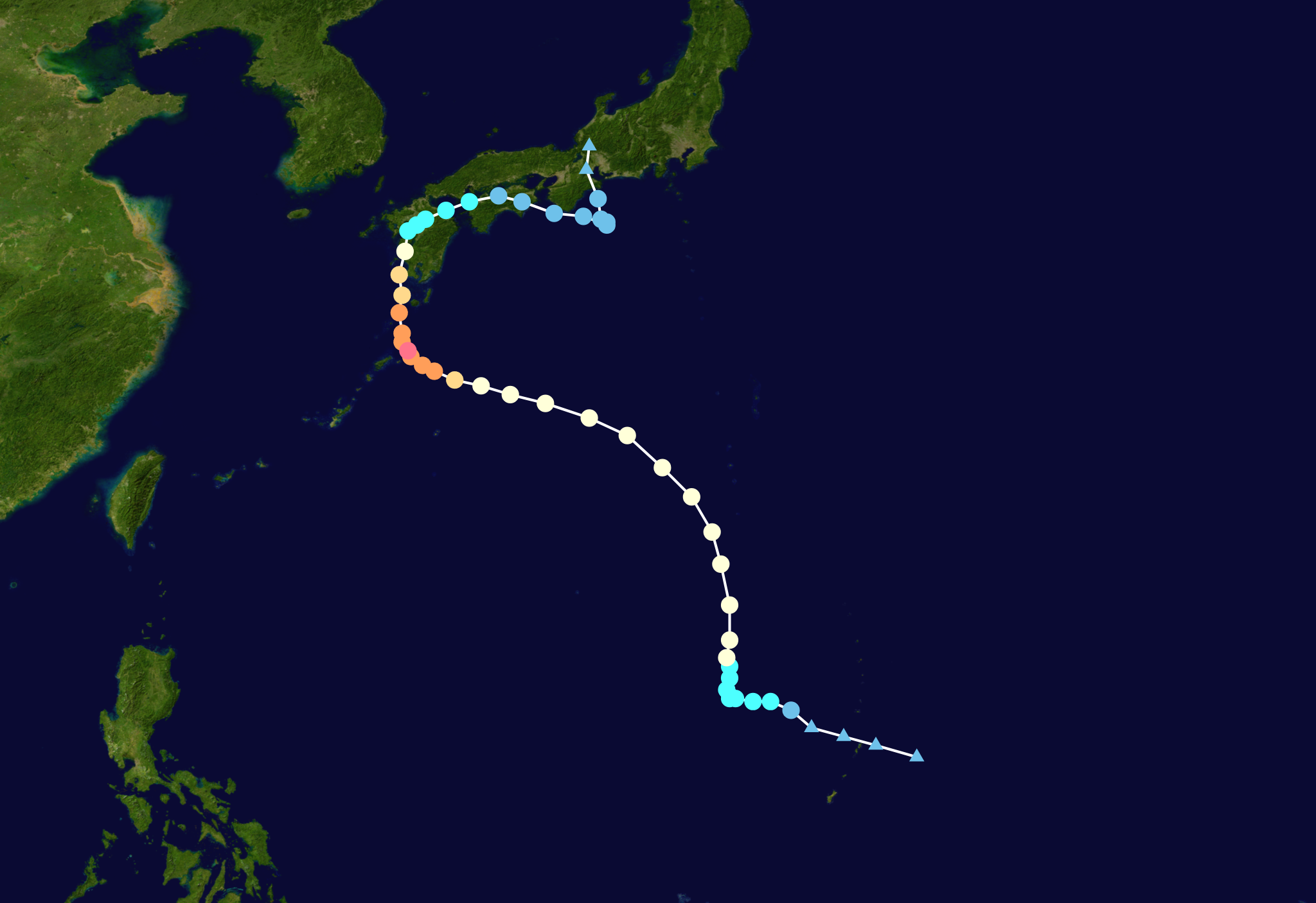
Map plotting the storm's track and intensity, according to the Saffir–Simpson scale Map key Saffir–Simpson scale Tropical depression (≤38 mph, ≤62 km/h) Tropical storm (39–73 mph, 63–118 km/h) Category 1 (74–95 mph, 119–153 km/h) Category 2 (96–110 mph, 154–177 km/h) Category 3 (111–129 mph, 178–208 km/h) Category 4 (130–156 mph, 209–251 km/h) Category 5 (≥157 mph, ≥252 km/h) Unknown Storm type Tropical cyclone Subtropical cyclone Extratropical cyclone, remnant low, tropical disturbance, or monsoon depression

The origins of Typhoon Shanshan can be traced back to August 20, when the Japan Meteorological Agency (JMA) reported that a tropical depression had formed near the Mariana Islands. At midnight on August 21, the United States Joint Typhoon Warning Center (JTWC) upgraded the tropical depression, designating the system as 11W due to deep convection beginning to consolidate into a central dense overcast. Shortly after, the depression intensified into a tropical storm and was named Shanshan by the JMA due to low vertical wind shear, warm sea surface temperatures, and high ocean heat content. However, Shanshan's movement was nearly stationary due to the weak steering flow. Around 12:00 UTC on August 22, the JMA upgraded it to a severe tropical storm, citing Dvorak technique—a method of determining a tropical cyclone's intensity based on satellite appearance. A ragged eye-like feature appeared on satellite imagery on August 23, and early the next day, both the JMA and the JTWC upgraded it to a minimal typhoon.

Shanshan shortly after reaching its peak intensity on August 28

Shanshan began developing poleward outflow into the west-northwest edge of a tropical upper tropospheric trough cell and then turned northward due to the interaction with an upper vortex. Despite its medium size, it quickly organized and developed a pinhole eye on satellite imagery, with deep convection wrapping around an obscured low-level circulation center. However, due to moderate wind shear, Shanshan became partially exposed and poorly organized; nonetheless, on August 26, deep convection began to increase rapidly, with Shanshan developing a compact eye that was obscured by cirrus cloud. Shanshan then turned west-northwestward along the southwestern periphery of a mid-level subtropical high. The typhoon displayed a symmetrical structure with a clear eye measuring 12.7 miles (20.4 km) in diameter, which later became cloud-filled and was encircled by symmetric deep convection. Shanshan underwent an eyewall replacement cycle, in which the inner eyewall deteriorated while being encased by a clearly defined outer eyewall. Shanshan completed its eyewall replacement cycle on August 27 and began rapidly intensifying again, featuring a symmetric eye with a diameter of 29–35 miles (46–56 km) while stalling near Kikaijima, surrounded by cold cloud tops at −94 °F (−70 °C). The JMA reported that Shanshan reached its peak intensity at 15:00 UTC with 10-minute sustained winds of 175 km/h (110 mph) and a central pressure of 935 hPa (27.61 inHg), before eventually peaking at Category 4-equivalent intensity on the Saffir-Simpson scale with 1-minute sustained winds of 215 km/h (130 mph). A study by Imperial College London suggests that Shanshan's extreme winds and heavy precipitation were strengthened by climate change.

After reaching its peak intensity, the typhoon's structure further decayed on August 28, becoming cooler and less defined, which coincided with a warming of the eyewall cloud tops as it moved through the Ryukyu Islands. Shanshan then turned northward between two mid-level subtropical ridges and made landfall near Satsumasendai in Kagoshima Prefecture around 8 a.m. local time on August 29. This made Shanshan the strongest typhoon to strike Japan in decades and one of the most powerful storms to make landfall since 1960. After the system made landfall, satellite imagery and radar loops showed the rapid erosion and disintegration of convective tops and feeder bands. Owing to its interaction with rugged terrain, Shanshan weakened to a minimal tropical storm. It then turned eastward along the northern periphery of a subtropical high, quickly crossed the Seto Inland Sea, and made landfall over the northern tip of Shikoku on August 30. By that time, its convection had diminished, and the low-level circulation center had become disorganized; however, convection slightly increased after six hours as Shanshan's circulation moved back over open water and began moving east-southeastward due to the interaction with a mid-latitude trough. Around 09:00 UTC on August 31, the JTWC issued its final warning on the system as it had become an exposed circulation center surrounded by stratocumulus clouds. On September 1, Shanshan re-intensified into a weak tropical depression with 25 km/h (16 mph) winds and a well-defined circulation in the eastern semicircle, leading the JTWC to resume advisories as it drifted poleward along the northwestern edge of a low to mid-level subtropical ridge. However, the JTWC discontinued warnings on the system as it moved inland over Japan. The JMA continued to monitor the system until it dissipated at 18:00 UTC that day.

== Preparations ==
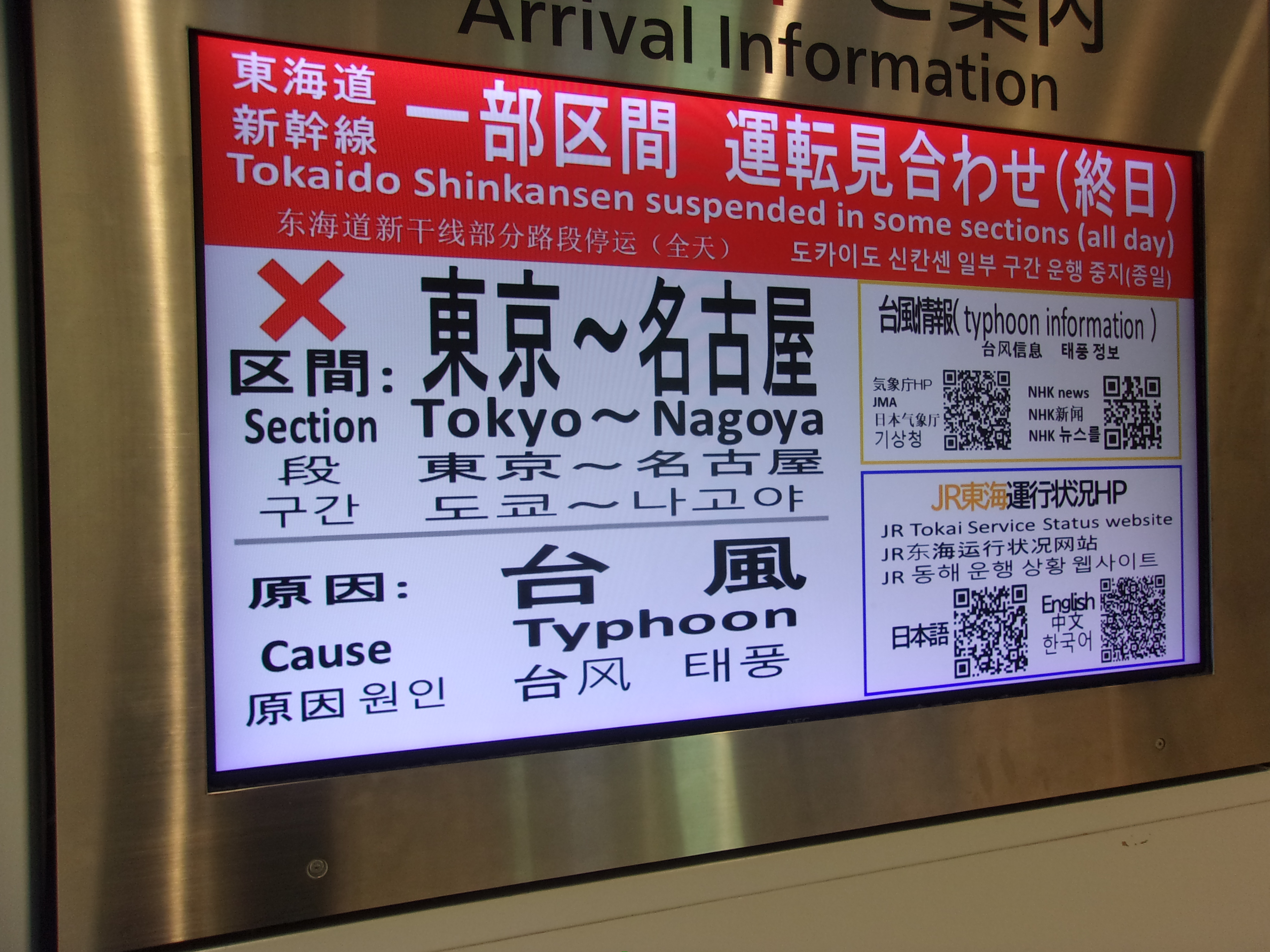
Notifications of Tokaido Shinkansen cancellations due to the typhoon

In advance of Shanshan, storm warnings were issued for 14 communities in the Satsuma and Ōsumi areas of Kagoshima Prefecture. The Japan Meteorological Agency (JMA) issued special weather warnings for Kagoshima Prefecture at 13:00 on August 28. This was the first emergency warning issued for Kagoshima Prefecture since Typhoon Nanmadol in 2022. An emergency storm warning and an emergency high tide warning were also issued for the entirety of Kagoshima Prefecture with the exception of the Amami Islands. A Level 5 emergency warning—the highest level of warning—was issued for Mishima, affecting 369 residents. Across parts of Kagoshima and Miyazaki prefectures, Level 4 evacuation notices were posted, which included 27 cities in Kagoshima Prefecture and the city of Miyazaki.

Evacuation orders were issued for 996,299 people in Miyazaki Prefecture and 982,273 people in Kagoshima Prefecture. Level 4 evacuation alerts were also issued for portions of Aichi Prefecture and Shizuoka Prefecture; a total of 342,666 people in Shizuoka Prefecture were given evacuation orders. The threat of mudslides caused the JMA to began issuing landslide and rockslide warnings in Kagoshima, Miyazaki, and Shizuoka prefectures. The Tokaido Shinkansen route was closed between Tokyo Station and Shin-Ōsaka Station, as well as between Hamamatsu Station and Toyohashi Station, due to rainfall amounts exceeding the regulatory limits for operation. The entire Kyushu Shinkansen route closed on August 29. Japan Airlines cancelled 402 domestic flights and ten international flights between August 28 and August 30. All Nippon Airways also cancelled 210 domestic flights for the same timeframe. Over 18,400 airline passengers were affected by these cancellations. In South Korea, a strong wind and heavy rain advisory were issued for the island of Jeju. Expressways and toll stations were briefly closed at some locations, though services were restored. Commuters were advised to be aware of traffic disruptions.

The Japan Post suspended postal and delivery services in Kyushu. Classes were cancelled at schools in Fukuoka, Kagoshima, and Yamaguchi prefectures. The Super GT announced that the second Suzuka round would be postponed to December 7–8. Multiple factories ceased operations for the duration of the typhoon, affecting companies such as Toyota which closed 14 plants, Nissan which closed a facility in Kyushu, Honda which closed a facility in Kumamoto, and Mazda which announced a potential closure of factories in Hiroshima and Hōfu. Department stores and other commercial facilities in Kagoshima and Aira were closed. Supermarkets also planned to close early across Kyushu. Overall, 5,210,258 people were ordered to evacuate across 12 prefectures.

== Impact ==
=== Kyushu and Ryukyu Islands ===
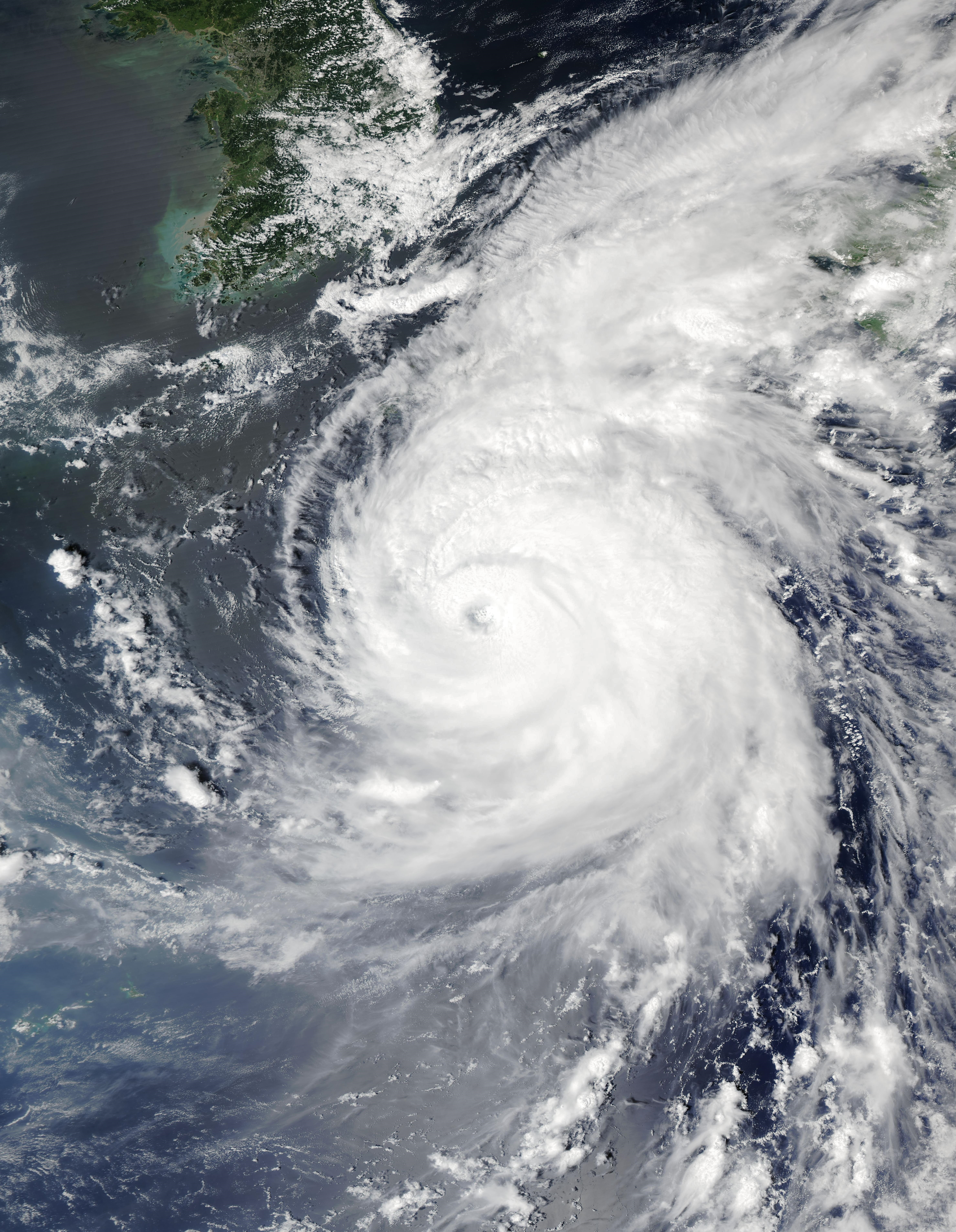
Shanshan approaching the coast of Kyushu on August 28

As Shanshan brushed the islands of Amami Ōshima and Kikaijima at Category 4-equivalent intensity, maximum sustained wind gusts near 100 miles per hour (160 km/h) were measured at Kikai Airport on the latter island. This was the strongest wind speed observed on Kikaijima in the month of August. One person was injured in Amami after strong winds knocked him down while he was riding a motorcycle. In Yakushima, where maximum gusts of 105 miles per hour (169 km/h) were recorded in the evening of August 28, a 3,000-year-old Yakusugi cedar tree named the Yayoi-sugi (弥生杉) was blown down. As Shanshan moved ashore in Kyushu, a wind gust of 85 miles per hour (137 km/h) was recorded in Makurazaki, Kagoshima. Due to the typhoon's slow movement, a linear precipitation zone developed over Kagoshima, Miyazaki, and Oita prefectures, resulting in prolonged torrential rainfall across the region. Overall, one person died and 29 others were injured in Kagoshima, four of them seriously, and 53 buildings were damaged in the prefecture. Strong winds in Miyazaki Prefecture caused 39 injuries and damaged 886 houses, including 160 in the city of Miyazaki. A metal sign at a clothing store was downed onto a vehicle, though no injuries occurred. Heavy rainfall in Oita Prefecture resulted in the overflowing of the Miyakawa River in Yufu, which prompted the issuance of a Level 5 emergency warning, affecting 2,311 residents. In Fukuoka Prefecture, two people died, 22 others were injured, one house was completely destroyed and six structures were damaged by the typhoon. One death and five injuries were reported in Saga Prefecture. There were also nine injuries in Nagasaki Prefecture, six in Kumamoto Prefecture and two in Ōita Prefecture. More than 260,000 residences in Kyushu lost access to electricity due to the storm.

=== Elsewhere ===
In Aichi Prefecture, the city of Gamagōri observed record breaking rainfall amounts as Shanshan neared Japan on August 26 and 27, resulting in a mudslide that killed three people and injured two others. Across the prefecture, 29 structures were damaged. Shanshan caused flooding which damaged 545 buildings in Shizuoka Prefecture, 100 in Gifu Prefecture, 72 in Kanagawa Prefecture, 27 in Iwate Prefecture, 26 in Saitama Prefecture, 25 in Tottori Prefecture and three more in Hokkaido. Two people were injured in Mie Prefecture. One person died after a roof collapsed in Tokushima Prefecture. Heavy rainfall affected the South Korean island of Jeju, reaching a maximum total of 154.5 millimetres (6.08 in) near Hallasan.

== See also ==
- Weather of 2024
- Tropical cyclones in 2024
- Typhoon Nanmadol (2022)
- Typhoon Haishen (2020)
- Typhoon Nabi (2005)
- List of Japan tornadoes
