= List of storms named Ampil =

The name Ampil (Khmer: អម្ពិល, [ʔɑm.ˈpɨl]) has been used for two tropical cyclones in the western North Pacific Ocean. The name was contributed by Cambodia and means tamarind (Tamarindus indica) in Khmer. It replaced the name Bopha after it was retired following the 2012 Pacific typhoon season.

- Severe Tropical Storm Ampil (2018) (T1810, 12W, Inday) – caused moderate damage in the Ryukyu Islands and East and Northeast China.
- Typhoon Ampil (2024) (T2407, 08W) – a high-latitude Category 3 typhoon that skirted Eastern Japan.

Preceded by Son-Tinh	Pacific typhoon season names Ampil	Succeeded by Wukong
