= List of storms named Maria =

The name Maria has been used for eight tropical cyclones worldwide: three in the Atlantic Ocean and five in the West Pacific Ocean.

In the Atlantic:

- Hurricane Maria (2005) – a Category 3 hurricane that did not affect land as a tropical cyclone.
- Hurricane Maria (2011) – a Category 1 hurricane that formed in the eastern Atlantic and made landfall in Newfoundland, causing minor damage.
- Hurricane Maria (2017) – an extremely powerful hurricane that made landfall in Dominica at Category 5 intensity; later brushed through Saint Croix and the United States Virgin Islands before making landfall in Puerto Rico as a high-end Category 4 hurricane, where a humanitarian crisis occurred.

The name Maria was retired after the 2017 season because of the extensive damage and loss of life caused by the storm. It was replaced with Margot for the 2023 season.

In the West Pacific:

- Tropical Storm Maria (2000) (T0013, 21W) – made landfall in southern China.
- Typhoon Maria (2006) (T0607, 09W) – tracked just south and east of Japan; the Joint Typhoon Warning Center classified it as a tropical storm.
- Severe Tropical Storm Maria (2012) (T1222, 23W) – a severe tropical storm that remained out at sea.
- Typhoon Maria (2018) (T1808, 10W, Gardo) – a Category 5-equivalent super typhoon which weakened before making landfall in eastern China.
- Severe Tropical Storm Maria (2024) (T2405, 06W) – a severe tropical storm that made landfall in the Tōhoku region of Japan.

== See also ==
- Storm (Stewart novel) – a book by George Rippey Stewart about an extratropical cyclone named Maria which helped lead to the naming of tropical cyclones worldwide.
  - "They Call the Wind Marīa" – a song by Lerner and Loewe inspired by Stewart's novel and performed in the musical Paint Your Wagon.

Storms with similar names

- Tropical Storm Malia (2015) – a Central Pacific tropical storm.

Preceded by Prapiroon	Pacific typhoon season names Maria	Succeeded by Son-Tinh
