= Tropical Storm Peipah (2025) =

Pacific tropical storm in 2025

Tropical Storm Peipah (Kiko)
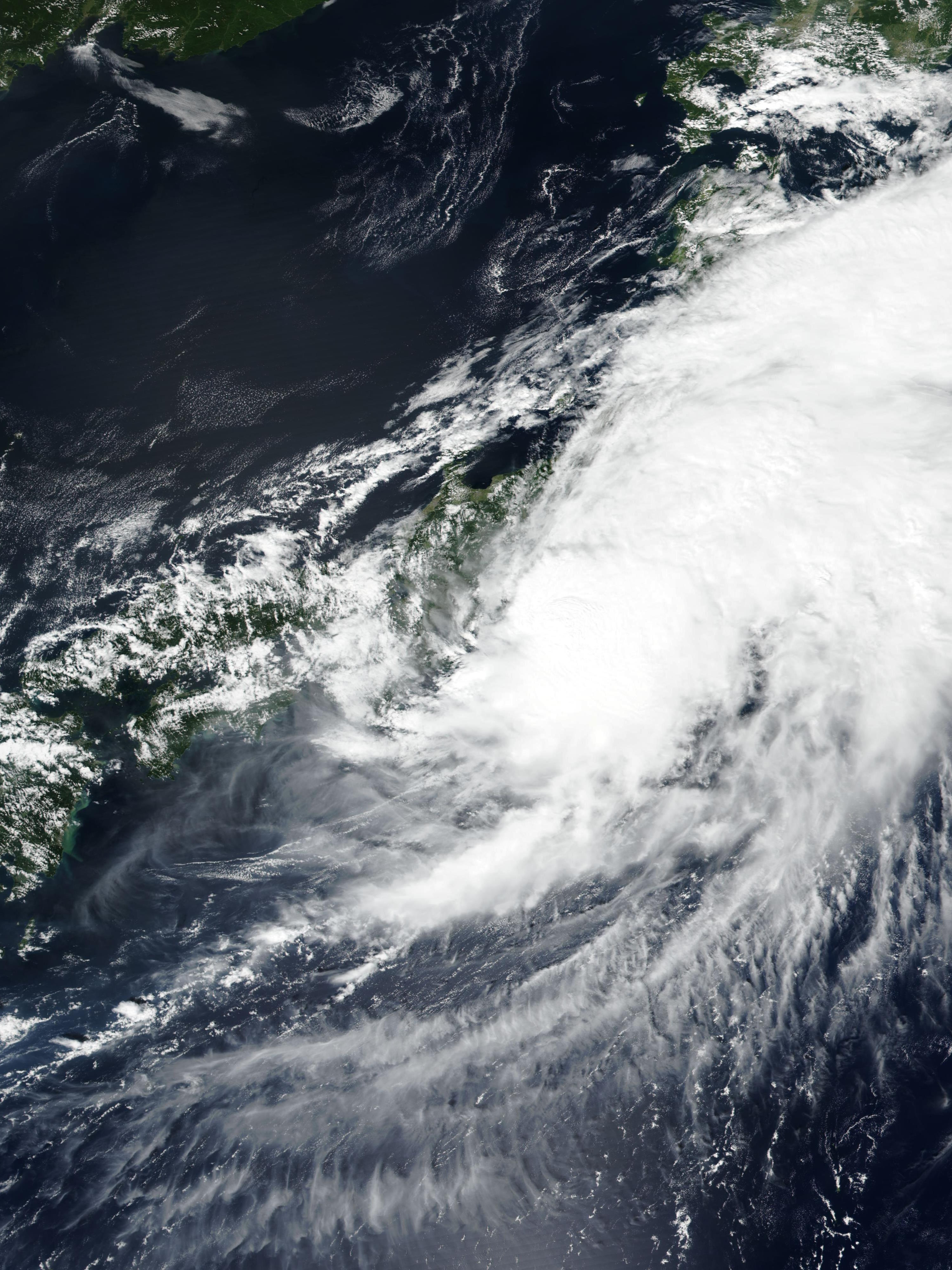
- Peipah as an extratropical cyclone on September 5

Meteorological history
- Formed: September 2, 2025
- Extratropical: September 5, 2025
- Dissipated: September 13, 2025

Tropical storm
- 10-minute sustained (JMA)
- Highest winds: 85 km/h (50 mph)
- Lowest pressure: 992 hPa (mbar); 29.29 inHg

Tropical storm
- 1-minute sustained (SSHWS/JTWC)
- Highest winds: 95 km/h (60 mph)
- Lowest pressure: 990 hPa (mbar); 29.23 inHg

Overall effects
- Fatalities: 1
- Injuries: 89
- Damage: $150 million (2025 USD)
- Areas affected: Ryukyu Islands, West & East Japan
- Part of the 2025 Pacific typhoon season

Tropical Storm Peipah, (Note: The name Peipah (Cantonese: 琵琶, [pʰei˨˩ pʰaː˨˩]) was contributed by Macau and means pipa or anglerfish in Cantonese.) known in the Philippines as Tropical Depression Kiko, was a weak tropical storm that affected Japan in early September 2025. The fifteenth named storm of the 2025 Pacific typhoon season, Peipah originated as a low-pressure area near Palau on August 30. Situated in the Philippine Area of Responsibility (PAR), the Philippine Atmospheric, Geophysical and Astronomical Services Administration (PAGASA) classified the system as a tropical depression on September 2 and gave it the local name Kiko. Two days later, the Japan Meteorological Agency (JMA) (Note: The Japan Meteorological Agency is the official Regional Specialized Meteorological Center for the western Pacific Ocean.) upgraded it to a tropical storm, assigning it the international name Peipah.

Tracking northward, the storm passed near the Ryukyu Islands before curving eastward and brushing the southern coast of western Japan on September 4. Peipah made landfall over Sukumo, Kōchi Prefecture, Japan, at around 01:00 JST (16:00 UTC) on the following day, and later that morning, at 09:00 JST, struck northern Wakayama Prefecture as it moved across the Kii Peninsula. The system then began extratropical transition while accelerating east-northeastward along the northern edge of the subtropical ridge. Both the JMA and the Joint Typhoon Warning Center (JTWC) (Note: The Joint Typhoon Warning Center is a joint United States Navy – United States Air Force task force that issues tropical cyclone warnings for the western Pacific Ocean and other regions.) issued their final advisories later that day as Peipah became an extratropical low. AON estimates that losses totaled to US$150 million.

== Meteorological history ==
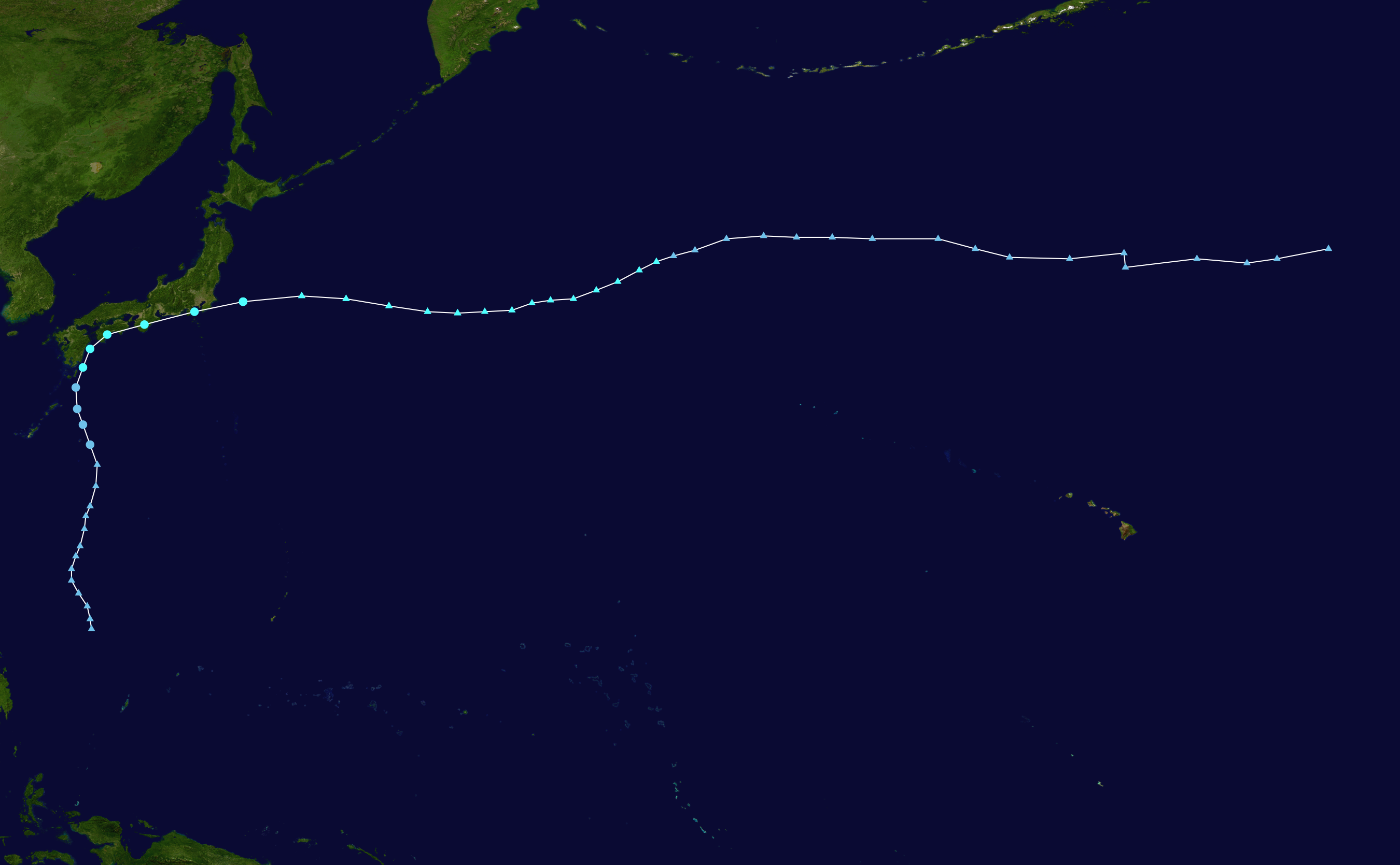
Map plotting the storm's track and intensity, according to the Saffir–Simpson scale Map key Saffir–Simpson scale Tropical depression (≤38 mph, ≤62 km/h) Tropical storm (39–73 mph, 63–118 km/h) Category 1 (74–95 mph, 119–153 km/h) Category 2 (96–110 mph, 154–177 km/h) Category 3 (111–129 mph, 178–208 km/h) Category 4 (130–156 mph, 209–251 km/h) Category 5 (≥157 mph, ≥252 km/h) Unknown Storm type Tropical cyclone Subtropical cyclone Extratropical cyclone, remnant low, tropical disturbance, or monsoon depression

On September 2, 2025 at 12:00 UTC (21:00 JST), the Japan Meteorological Agency (JMA) began monitoring a newly formed tropical depression located approximately 430 nmi (800 km) southeast of Naha, Okinawa. At 08:00 PHT (00:00 UTC) on September 3, the Philippine Atmospheric, Geophysical and Astronomical Services Administration (PAGASA) began issuing advisories on the system after it entered the Philippine Area of Responsibility, assigning it the local name Kiko. Later that same day, the Joint Typhoon Warning Center (JTWC) issued a Tropical Cyclone Formation Alert (TCFA) for the disturbance, noting the likelihood of tropical cyclogenesis within 24 hours due to improving environmental conditions, including warm sea surface temperatures and decreasing vertical wind shear.

At 15:00 UTC, the JTWC upgraded the system to a tropical depression, assigning it the designation 21W. During the early hours of September 4, the JMA upgraded the system to a tropical storm, assigning it the international name Peipah. At this point, the system was tracking north-northeastward along the northwestern periphery of the subtropical ridge, aided by favorable upper-level divergence and warm oceanic waters. Peipah later curved eastward under the influence of an approaching mid-latitude trough and began to affect the southern coastline of western Japan.

At 01:00 JST (16:00 UTC) on September 5, the system made landfall over Sukumo in Kōchi Prefecture, bringing strong winds and heavy rainfall to parts of Shikoku and the surrounding areas. Shortly afterward, at 09:00 JST (00:00 UTC), Peipah made a second landfall over northern Wakayama Prefecture, skimming past the Kii Peninsula as it continued its east-northeastward track. Following these landfalls, the JTWC reported that Peipah had begun undergoing extratropical transition as it began to acquire characteristics of a mid-latitude cyclone. The system exhibited hybrid features, with a partially cold-core structure and asymmetric convection, while accelerating over cooler waters to the east. Satellite imagery during this period revealed that the system’s deep convection was being significantly sheared by 25–30 knots of vertical wind shear associated with a nearby shortwave trough located to its northwest. Peipah later completed its transition and became an extratropical low, causing both JMA and JTWC to cease advisories at 15:00 UTC and 12:00 UTC respectively.

== Preparations ==
In Japan, a heavy rain warning was issued by the JMA, urging residents to remain vigilant due to the increased risk of landslides and flooding. In response to the approaching storm, the West Nippon Expressway Company announced the closure of several road sections, particularly along the Higashikyushu Expressway. Railway operators from thrEast Japan Railway Company have announced delays, suspensions, and cancellations as the storm affected its service.

Meanwhile, local fishermen secured their vessels and implemented safety measures in preparation for the storm. In Miyazaki Prefecture, authorities issued a tornado advisory, warning of a heightened risk of tornado activity associated with the storm's outer bands. The government ordered 660,000 people to evacuate. Operations of the Tokaido Shinkansen bullet-train service were partly suspended.

== Impact ==
=== Japan ===
Widespread heavy rainfall was recorded across the southern regions of Japan as the system advanced northward. On the morning of September 4, JMA recorded a rainfall total of 147 millimetres (5.8 inches) in parts of Miyazaki Prefecture. The island of Tanegashima also experienced significant rainfall, with measurements reaching 32 mm (1.3 in). Asahi had more than 100 mm (3.9 in) of downpour, flooding roads in the city. 16,000 houses in the cities of Matsuyama and Ōzu lost power because of the damage of a transformer. Lightning damaged agricultural greenhouses. 40 houses have been recorded as completely destroyed while damage was confirmed in four municipalities in Shizuoka Prefecture including in Kakegawa and Yaizu cities. 30 people were deemed injured because of the storm. In Makinohara, a powerful EF3 tornado, produced by the outer bands of Peipah, tore through the city. Several homes and businesses received moderate to major damage and vehicles were overturned, with multiple people being injured. The tornado was assessed to have a maximum estimated wind gust of 270 km/h (170 mph), making the tornado one of the strongest in Japan on record. At least 89 people were injured and one man was killed as his car was overturned by the tornado. Additionally, a JEF2 tornado affected the city of Kakegawa. Multiple landslides were recorded from the storm; five houses were flooded.

During the storm's movement, the regions of Kantō, Kōshin, and Tōkai had also experienced travel problems, and major travel issues due to the storm. Confusion affected the Tōkaidō Shinkansen, and travel options like local trains and bus services in Central and East Japan experienced late operations, especially the areas that are close to the center of the storm. Tokyo's two major airports, Narita and Haneda, delayed and canceled all their flights as rain continued to sweep over the region.

=== Elsewhere ===
Although Peipah indirectly affected the Philippines, its enhancement with the southwest monsoon affected more than 93,000 people, with nearly 1,300 people being displaced across four regions of the country.

== See also ==
- Weather of 2025
- Tropical cyclones in 2025
- Other storms named Peipah
- Other storms named Kiko
- Tropical Storm Zia (1999) - made landfall in a similar area
- List of Japan tornadoes
