= Typhoon Ampil (2024) =

Pacific typhoon in 2024

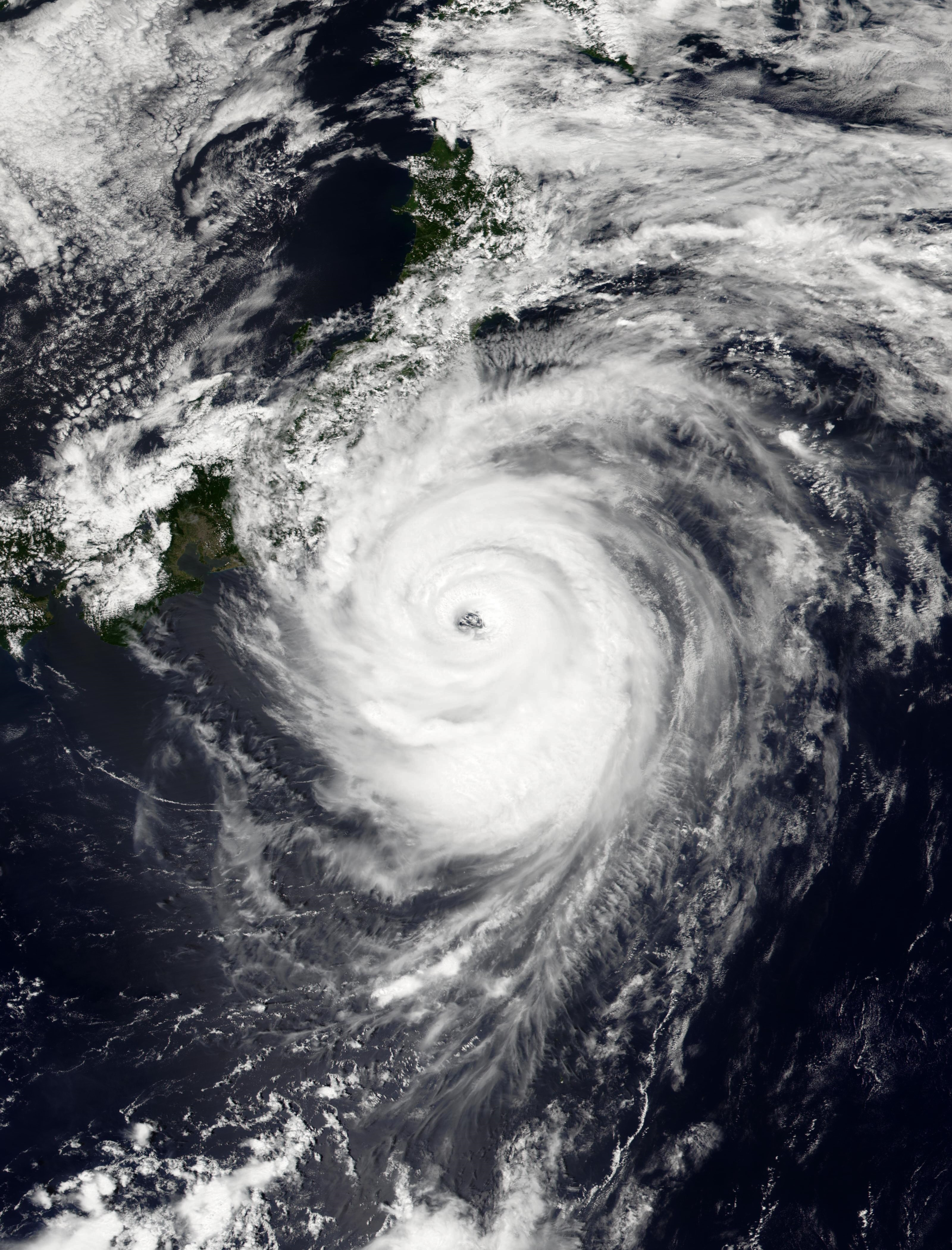
- Ampil nearing its peak intensity while off the coast of Japan on August 16

Meteorological history
- Formed: August 11, 2024
- Extratropical: August 19, 2024
- Dissipated: August 23, 2024

Very strong typhoon
- 10-minute sustained (JMA)
- Highest winds: 155 km/h (100 mph)
- Lowest pressure: 950 hPa (mbar); 28.05 inHg

Category 3-equivalent typhoon
- 1-minute sustained (SSHWS/JTWC)
- Highest winds: 205 km/h (125 mph)
- Lowest pressure: 939 hPa (mbar); 27.73 inHg

Overall effects
- Injuries: 4 total
- Damage: Minimal
- Areas affected: Japan, Alaska
- IBTrACS
- Part of the 2024 Pacific typhoon season

Typhoon Ampil (Note: The name Ampil (Khmer: អម្ពិល, [ʔɑm.ˈpɨl]) was contributed by Cambodia and means tamarind (Tamarindus indica) in Khmer language.) was a powerful tropical cyclone that brushed Japan, then brought gusty winds to Alaska as an extratropical storm, in early August 2024. The seventh named storm and third typhoon of the annual typhoon season. Ampil originated from an atmospheric convection east of Kadena Air Base and was later classified as a tropical storm on August 12 and named Ampil by the Japan Meteorological Agency. Ampil gradually intensified as it turned northward, reaching its peak intensity with ten-minute sustained winds of 155 km/h (100 mph) and a central pressure of 950 hPa (28.05 inHg) before peaking at Category 3-equivalent intensity on the Saffir–Simpson scale on August 16, with one-minute sustained winds of 205 km/h (125 mph) before making its closest approach to Japan. It then rapidly weakened as it began to undergo an extratropical transition on August 19. The remnants of Ampil accelerated east-northeastward, entering the Bering Sea, crossing the Aleutian Islands in Alaska, and then moving inland over the Russian Far East and Arctic Alaska before emerging into the Arctic Ocean and dissipating on August 23.

Ampil affected Japan during the Obon holiday week, shortly after Tropical Storm Maria caused unprecedented rainfall to northern Japan. As the storm neared the coast, hundreds of thousands in Tokyo and nearby regions were urged to evacuate. Numerous modes of transportation, such as flights and trains, were canceled due to the approaching typhoon. The NHK reported that Tokyo suffered minimal damage, while four people were injured across the Kantō region. However, Japan was struck by a more powerful cyclone named Typhoon Shanshan one week later. Later, the remnants of Ampil caused a high surf advisory, a high wind watch, and a coastal flood advisory in Alaska, bringing strong winds and coastal waves to western Alaska. Ampil contributed to an atmospheric river when its moist core entered a low-pressure system and merged with the Pacific jet stream, which was anticipated to reach California.

== Meteorological history ==
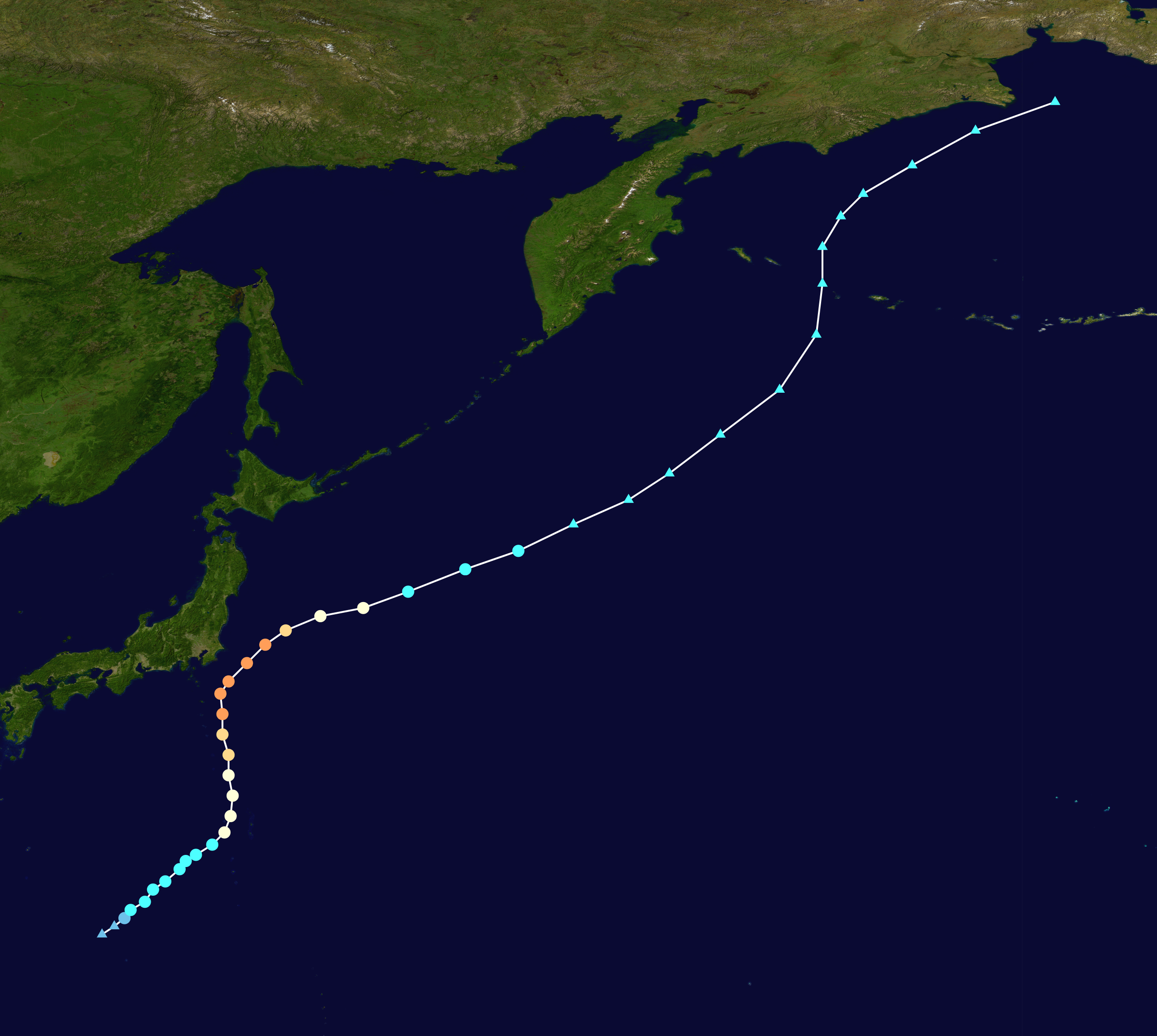
Map plotting the storm's track and intensity, according to the Saffir–Simpson scale Map key Saffir–Simpson scale Tropical depression (≤38 mph, ≤62 km/h) Tropical storm (39–73 mph, 63–118 km/h) Category 1 (74–95 mph, 119–153 km/h) Category 2 (96–110 mph, 154–177 km/h) Category 3 (111–129 mph, 178–208 km/h) Category 4 (130–156 mph, 209–251 km/h) Category 5 (≥157 mph, ≥252 km/h) Unknown Storm type Tropical cyclone Subtropical cyclone Extratropical cyclone, remnant low, tropical disturbance, or monsoon depression

Typhoon Ampil originated from an area of convection 976 km (606 mi) east of Kadena Air Base on August 3. At 18:00 UTC on August 11, the Japan Meteorological Agency (JMA) designated it as a tropical depression. Soon after, the United States Joint Typhoon Warning Center (JTWC) began to re-monitor it, noting that it was in a marginal favorable environment for development. At 07:00 UTC on August 12, the agency issued a tropical cyclone formation alert on the disturbance. A few hours later, they recognized the system as a tropical depression, designating it as 08W. Soon after, the JMA noted that it had intensified into a tropical storm, with convective bands wrapping around a well-defined low-level circulation center, and named it Ampil.

Typhoon Ampil passing east of Japan on August 16

Afterward, it moved north-northeastward, primarily influenced by the strengthening low-level flow. A central dense overcast was obscuring the low-level circulation center; however, Ampil became distinctly better defined, featuring a well-defined center and spiral banding. The JMA upgraded the system to a severe tropical storm on August 13. Around 15:00 UTC on August 14, the JTWC reported that Ampil had intensified into a minimal typhoon, as animated infrared imagery indicated the development of a pinhole eye feature, which exhibited excellent equatorward outflow and good poleward outflow. The JMA then reported that Ampil had intensified into a typhoon due to warm sea surface temperatures and low vertical wind shear on August 15.

The JMA reported that Ampil reached its peak intensity at 12:00 UTC that day with 10-minute sustained winds of 155 km/h (100 mph) and a central pressure of 950 hPa (28.05 inHg). Ampil then turned northward, along the western periphery of a mid-level subtropical ridge. Ampil eventually peaked at Category 3-equivalent intensity on the Saffir-Simpson scale at 03:00 UTC on August 16, with 1-minute sustained winds of 205 km/h (125 mph) and a large eye measuring 74.1 km (46.0 mi) in diameter before making its closest approach to Japan. Operationally, the JTWC classified Ampil as a Category 4-equivalent cyclone, with winds of 215 km/h (130 mph). This made Ampil the first storm in the 21st century in the Western Pacific basin to reach the 34th parallel north while at or above Category 3-equivalent strength, with only two others having been recorded—Typhoon Carmen in 1965 and Typhoon Oscar in 1995. Additionally, the JTWC assessed the lowest barometric pressure as 939 hPa (27.73 inHg).

Ampil degraded due to internal fluctuations and a symmetric central dense overcast, while convection was confined to the southern semicircle. Satellite imagery depicted a well-defined 17 km (10 mi) wide eye surrounded by deep convection, though the banding diminished after encountering cold, dry air. Ampil was beginning to undergo an extratropical transition, as its convective structures had dissipated by August 17. The JTWC then ceased issuing advisories on the system the next day as it turned east-northeastward and merged with the mid-latitude westerlies. The JMA reported that Ampil had transitioned into an extratropical low on August 19. The extratropical storm entered the Bering Sea on August 20, crossed the Aleutian Islands, moved inland over the Russian Far East and Arctic Alaska, emerged into the Arctic Ocean between August 21–22, and dissipated on August 23.

== Preparations and impact ==
=== Japan ===
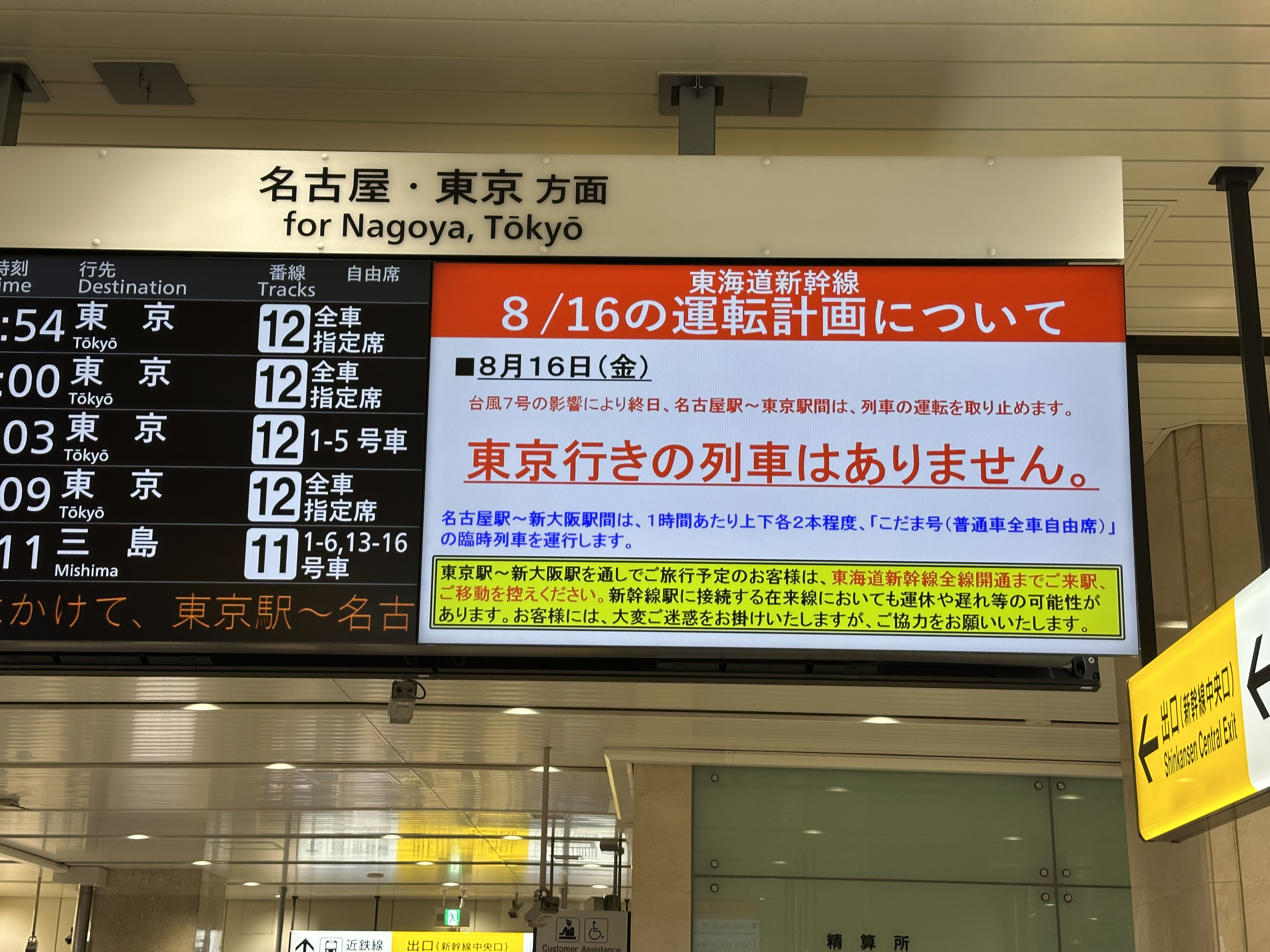
Notifications of Tokaido Shinkansen cancellations due to Ampil

Typhoon Ampil arrived during Japan's Obon holiday week—just days after Tropical Storm Maria caused record-breaking rainfall in parts of northern Japan. As the strong storm brushed the coast of Japan, hundreds of thousands in Tokyo and surrounding areas were advised to evacuate. A total of around 178,000 households, over 404,000 people, were given an evacuation order. Similar notices were issued in Yokohama. Many modes of transportation like flights and trains were cancelled on August 16 as the typhoon approached. Japan Airlines and All Nippon Airways cancelled around 600 flights to Haneda Airport and Narita International Airport. East of Tokyo in the Chiba Prefecture, trees were downed and many roads were flooded. In Tokyo and in multiple bordering regions, heavy rainfall affected areas, increasing the risk of flooding and landslides. High waves warnings were issued, mainly in the Izu Islands. The Tropical Cyclone Condition of Readiness (TCCOR) was raised from TCCOR 3 to TCCOR 2 for Yokosuka Naval Base on August 15, indicating that winds of 92 km/h (57 mph) or higher were possible within 24 hours. A barrier obstructing Japan's Mount Fuji from a nearby convenience store was recently taken down to avoid damage.

A Level 4 evacuation order was issued for Mobara and Asahi in Chiba Prefecture, along with Iwaki in Fukushima Prefecture. All buslines in the city of Mobara were cancelled. Tokyo Disneyland closed around six hours before normal closing time, and it was closed all together on August 17. The cancellation of flights and railway transportation was expected to impact over 120,000 people. The NHK reported that Tokyo suffered minimal damage, while four people were injured across the Kantō region. Over 5,000 homes were left without power, though only 250 in both Ibaraki and Tochigi. Signboards were damaged, as well as bicycles and poles getting knocked over by strong winds. After the storm passed by, some flights were still delayed by Yamato Transport, while energy company officials confirmed that electricity was restored to most areas by August 17.

=== Alaska and California ===
The remnants of Ampil were driving a frontal boundary across Alaska, prompting a high surf advisory and a high wind watch for the Seward Peninsula, Gambell, St. Lawrence Island, while a coastal flood advisory was in effect for the Bering Strait Coast, the Yukon–Kuskokwim Delta Coast, the eastern Norton Sound, and the Nulato Hills. Ampil brought strong winds and coastal waves to western Alaska. Ampil's remnants influenced an atmospheric river as its moist core flowed into the low-pressure system and was absorbed into the Pacific jet stream, which was expected to reach California. When the storm arrived, the first August snowfall was forecasted since 2003 at Tioga Pass, and a dusting was recorded. Up to 3 in (7.6 cm) of snow fell in the Sierra Nevada.

== See also ==
- Tropical cyclones in 2024
- Weather of 2024
- List of Alaska tropical cyclones
- Tropical Storm Mirinae (2021) - another tropical cyclone followed the same trajectory as Ampil, although it was in a weaker category
- Typhoon Shanshan (2018) – another tropical system which passed very close to Japan
- Typhoon Faxai (2019) – impacted the same areas threatened by Ampil
