= List of storms named Son-Tinh =

The name Son-Tinh (Vietnamese: Sơn Tinh, [səːn˧˧ tïŋ˧˧]) has been used for three tropical cyclones in the northwestern Pacific Ocean. It replaced Saomai, which was retired after the 2006 Pacific typhoon season. The name was contributed by Vietnam and refers to Tản Viên Sơn Thánh, the god of the Ba Vì mountain range in Vietnamese.

- Typhoon Son-Tinh (2012) (T1223, 24W, Ofel) – a Category 3 typhoon that traversed the Philippines and later made landfall in northern Vietnam.
- Tropical Storm Son-Tinh (2018) (T1809, 11W, Henry) - A weak but deadly storm that caused severe floods and mudslides in Vietnam and in Laos.
- Tropical Storm Son-Tinh (2024) (T2406, 07W) – a weak tropical storm that initially showed subtropical characteristics.

| Preceded by Maria | Pacific typhoon season names Son-Tinh | Succeeded by Ampil |
