= Typhoon Maria (2006) =

Pacific typhoon in 2006

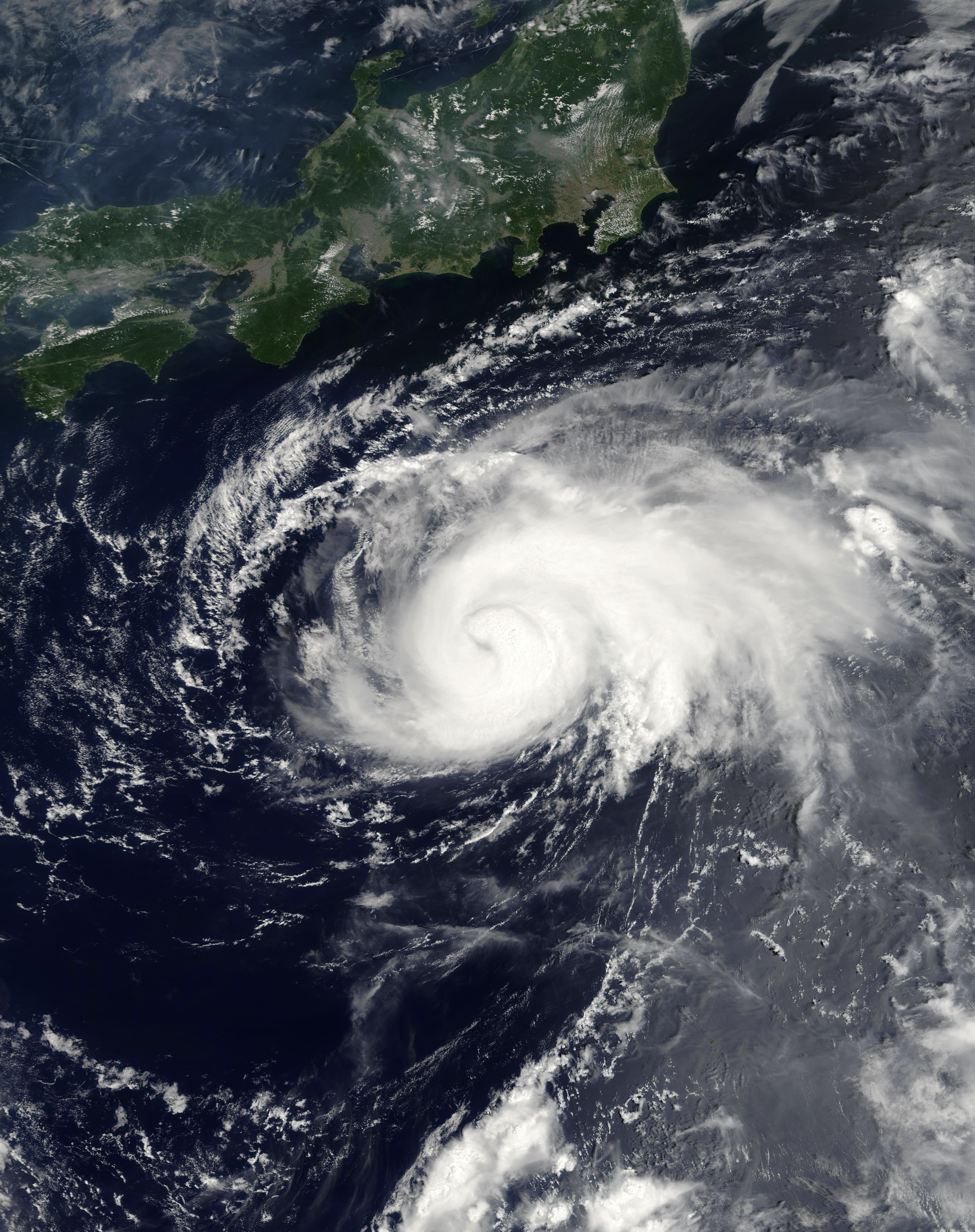
- Typhoon Maria at peak intensity on August 7

Meteorological history
- Formed: August 3, 2006
- Extratropical: August 10, 2006
- Dissipated: August 14, 2006

Typhoon
- 10-minute sustained (JMA)
- Highest winds: 130 km/h (80 mph)
- Lowest pressure: 975 hPa (mbar); 28.79 inHg

Tropical storm
- 1-minute sustained (SSHWS/JTWC)
- Highest winds: 110 km/h (70 mph)
- Lowest pressure: 980 hPa (mbar); 28.94 inHg

Overall effects
- Fatalities: 1 total
- Damage: Minimal
- Areas affected: Japan
- IBTrACS
- Part of the 2006 Pacific typhoon season

Typhoon Maria (Note: The name Maria (Chamorro: Maria, [mæɾiæ]) was contributed by the United States and is a feminine given name in Chamorro.) was a minimal typhoon which brushed the southeastern coast of Japan during early August 2006. The seventh named storm of the 2006 Pacific typhoon season, Maria formed out of a tropical depression over the open waters of the western Pacific Ocean. On August 5, the Japan Meteorological Agency (JMA) classified the depression as a tropical storm while the Joint Typhoon Warning Center (JTWC) kept it as a depression. The storm quickly strengthened into a typhoon the next day, reaching its peak intensity with winds of 130 km/h (80 mph 10-minute winds) early on August 6. The storm gradually weakened as it began to recurve, causing it to parallel the southeastern coast of Japan. On August 9, Maria weakened into a tropical depression and later into an extratropical cyclone before dissipating on August 15. Maria had only minor effects in Japan, mainly heavy rains which were estimated to have peaked over 400 mm (15.7 in) on the Izu Peninsula. One person was killed after being struck by lightning and six others were injured.

== Meteorological history ==
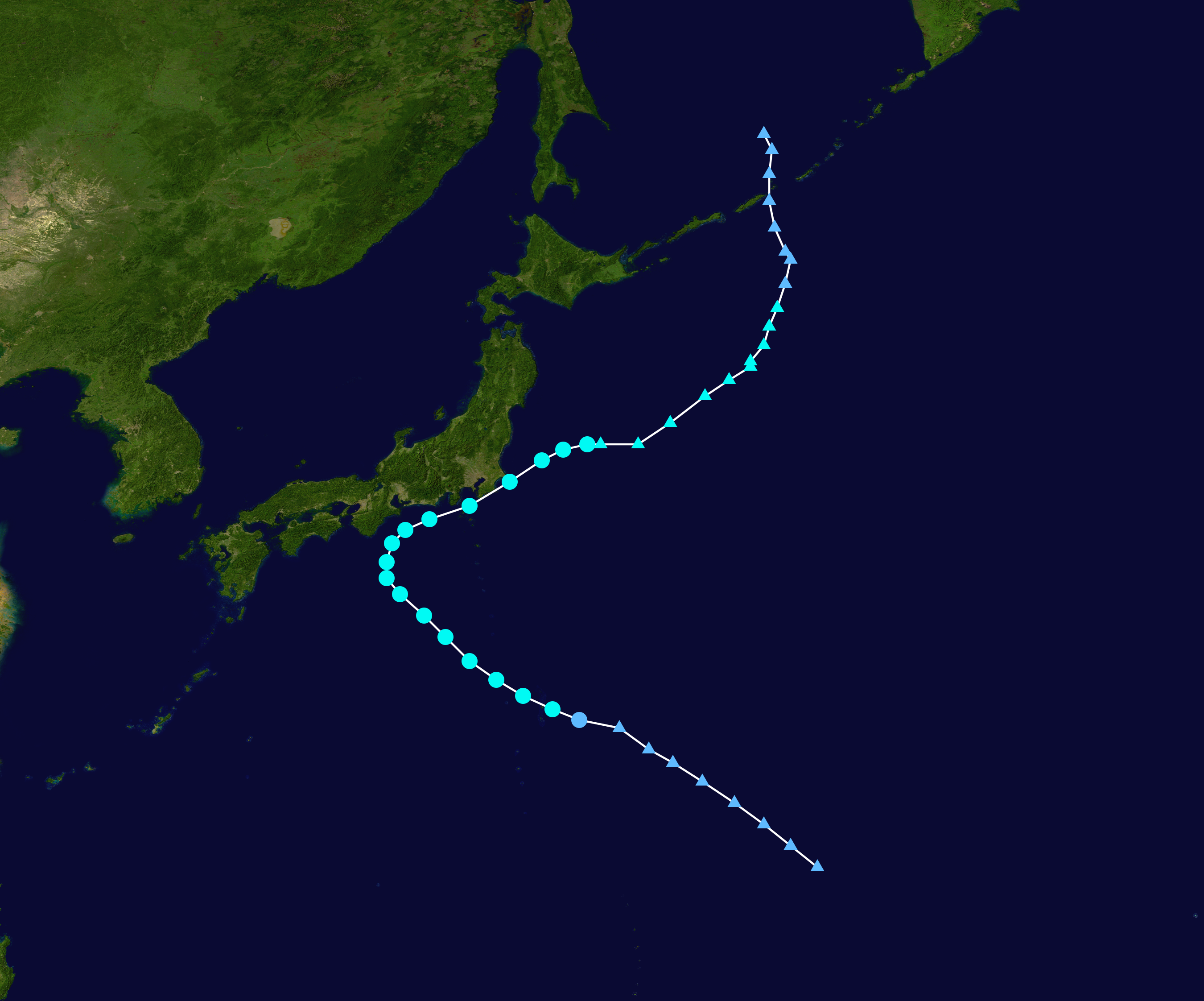
Map plotting the storm's track and intensity, according to the Saffir–Simpson scale Map key Saffir–Simpson scale Tropical depression (≤38 mph, ≤62 km/h) Tropical storm (39–73 mph, 63–118 km/h) Category 1 (74–95 mph, 119–153 km/h) Category 2 (96–110 mph, 154–177 km/h) Category 3 (111–129 mph, 178–208 km/h) Category 4 (130–156 mph, 209–251 km/h) Category 5 (≥157 mph, ≥252 km/h) Unknown Storm type Tropical cyclone Subtropical cyclone Extratropical cyclone, remnant low, tropical disturbance, or monsoon depression

On August 3, the Japan Meteorological Agency (JMA) began monitoring a tropical depression located to the southeast of Minami Torishima Island. The depression slowly developed as it moved towards the west-northwest. At 1630 UTC on August 5, the Joint Typhoon Warning Center (JTWC) issued a Tropical Cyclone Formation Alert on the developing system while it was located about 740 km (460 mi) east-northeast of the northern Mariana Islands. Deep convection was present around the center of circulation but the overall structure of the storm resembled a subtropical cyclone. However, the storm was likely to intensify as it was located within an area of low to moderate vertical wind shear with favorable diffulence aloft. Later that day, the JMA upgraded the depression to a tropical storm and gave it the name Maria. Maria continued towards the west-northwest along the edge of a broad subtropical ridge located east of Japan.

As the JMA issued their first advisory, the JTWC designated the system as Tropical Depression 09W while located about 280 km (175 mi) east-northeast of Iwo Jima. Early the next day, the JMA classified Maria as a severe tropical storm with winds of 95 km/h (60 mph 10-minute winds) while the JTWC reported that Maria had just become a tropical storm with winds reaching 75 km/h (45 mph 1-minute winds). The storm also had a slight northward relocation. Tracking towards the northwest, the storm intensified into a typhoon and reached its peak intensity with winds of 130 km/h (80 mph 10-minute winds) and minimum pressure of 975 hPa (mbar) at 0900 UTC. Around the same time, the JTWC assessed the storm to have reached its peak intensity with winds of 110 km/h (70 mph 1-minute winds). However, the JTWC operationally classified Maria as a minimal typhoon with winds of 120 km/h (75 mph 1-minute winds) on August 7.

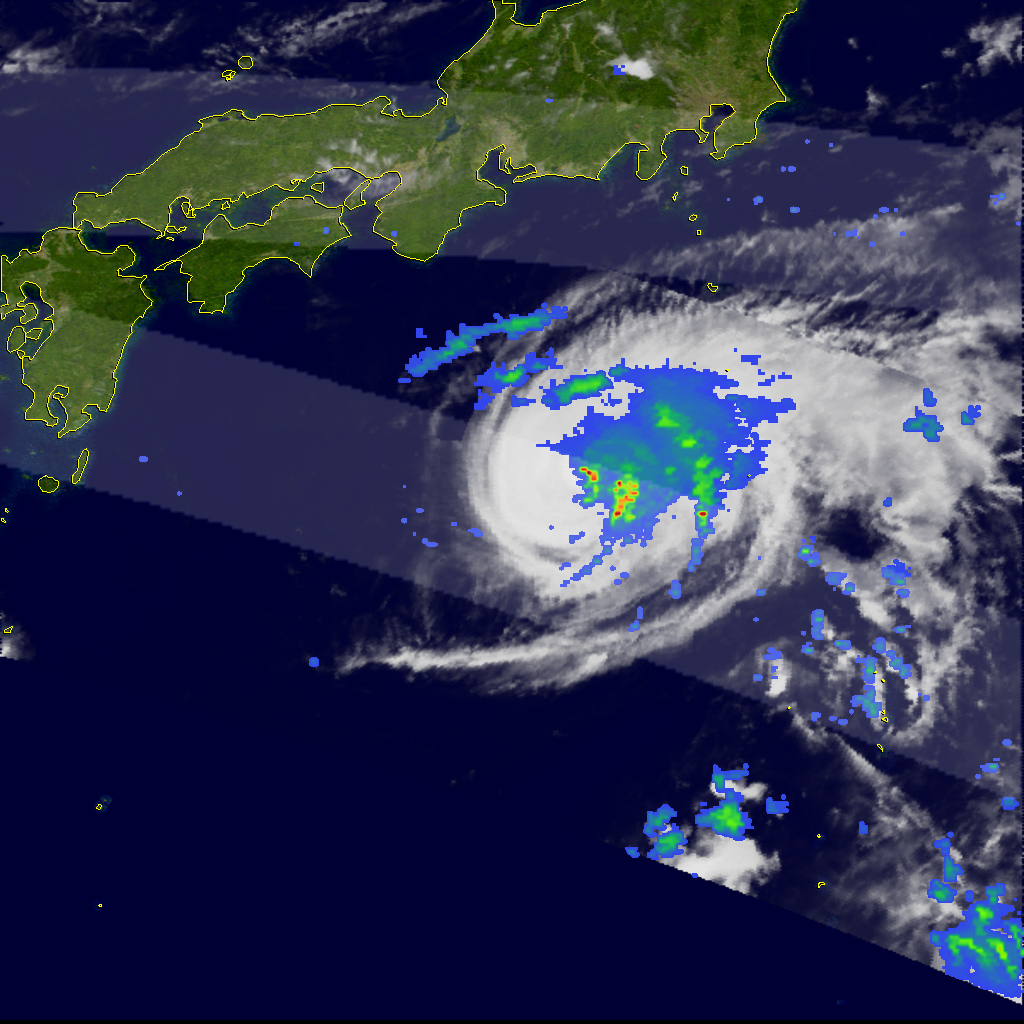
TRMM satellite image of Maria on August 7

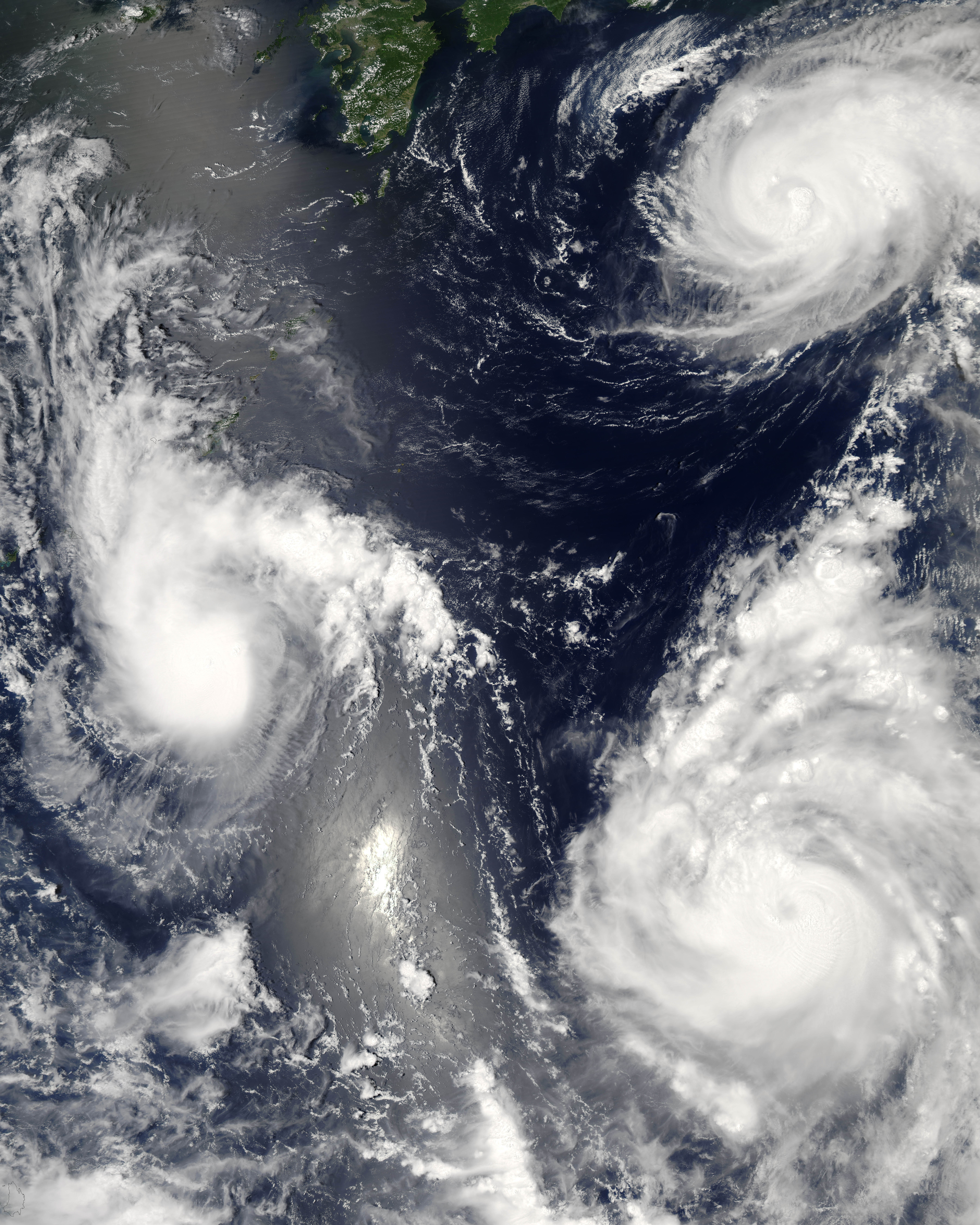
Three tropical cyclones of the 2006 Pacific typhoon season

On August 7, a banding eye feature developed with deep convection around the eastern portion of the storm. Later that day, the storm sharply recurved towards the northeast and paralleled the southern coastline of Honshu. As Maria made the turn, dry air began to enter the system, causing it to weaken. Along with the dry air, wind shear began to increase and the JMA downgraded Maria to a severe tropical storm early on August 8. The storm continued to weaken as it came very close to landfall near Tokyo, Japan on August 9. Both agencies downgraded Maria to a tropical depression early on August 9, with the JTWC issuing their final advisory at that time. Maria remained a tropical depression for another 24 hours before transitioning into an extratropical cyclone on August 10 while located about 835 km (520 mi) east-northeast of Tokyo. The extratropical remnants turned towards the north and dissipated late on August 14 over the Sea of Okhotsk.

== Preparations and impact ==
Weather officials warned residents about heavy rains, strong winds, and high waves in the Tōkai region, Kantō region, Kōshin'etsu region, and the Izu Islands between August 8 and 9. Seven flights out of Tokyo at Haneda airport were cancelled due to Maria. The JR Ito Line, an express train line, was temporarily shut down as a result of rain. As Maria brushed Japan, it produced heavy rains over the southeastern areas of the country. Yokota Air Base recorded 38.1 mm (1.5 in) of rainfall and winds up to 34 km/h (21 mph). Parts of the Izu Peninsula recorded rainfall in excess of 400 mm (15.7 in) over a two-day span, peaking at 458 mm (18.0 in) in Tokyo. In Gifu Prefecture, thunderstorms associated with the typhoon resulted in a landslide that knocked out power to 510 residences. One man was injured and two cows died after a small farm was severely damaged by high winds. Flooding and landslides affected dozens of homes in Chōshi, Chiba, prompting the evacuation of 63 families. One person was killed in Tokyo after being struck by lightning. Five people were injured when a plane headed for Tokyo encountered turbulence produced by Maria.

== See also ==
- Other tropical cyclones named Maria
- Timeline of the 2006 Pacific typhoon season
