= List of storms named Bopha =

The name Bopha (Khmer: បុប្ផា, [boʔ.pʰɑː]) was used for three tropical cyclones in the West Pacific Ocean. The name, contributed by Cambodia, is a female given name meaning flower in Khmer.

- Tropical Storm Bopha (2000) (T0015, 24W, Ningning) – An erratically moving system that eventually affected the Philippines.
- Severe Tropical Storm Bopha (2006) (T0609, 10W, Inday) – Caused minor impact on Taiwan.
- Typhoon Bopha (2012) (T1224, 26W, Pablo) – A very powerful late-season Category 5 typhoon which formed unusually close to the equator and struck Mindanao, the Philippines at peak intensity; more than 1900 people were killed.

The name Bopha was retired after the 2012 season and replaced with Ampil, which means tamarind in Khmer.

== See also ==
- Cyclone Bola (1988) – a South Pacific tropical cyclone with a similar name.
