= List of storms named Saomai =

The name Saomai (Vietnamese: sao Mai, [saːw˧˧ maːj˧˧]) has been used for two tropical cyclones in the western North Pacific Ocean. The name was contributed by Vietnam and means Venus, literally "morning star," in Vietnamese.

- Typhoon Saomai (2000) (T0014, 22W, Osang) - a Category 5 super typhoon impacted Japan and Korean peninsula.
- Typhoon Saomai (2006) (T0608, 08W, Juan) – another Category 5 super typhoon that caused 458 deaths in the Philippines and China.

The name Saomai was retired following the 2006 Pacific typhoon season and was replaced with Son-Tinh.
