= Tropical Storm Zia (1999) =

Tropical storm in the 1999 Pacific typhoon season

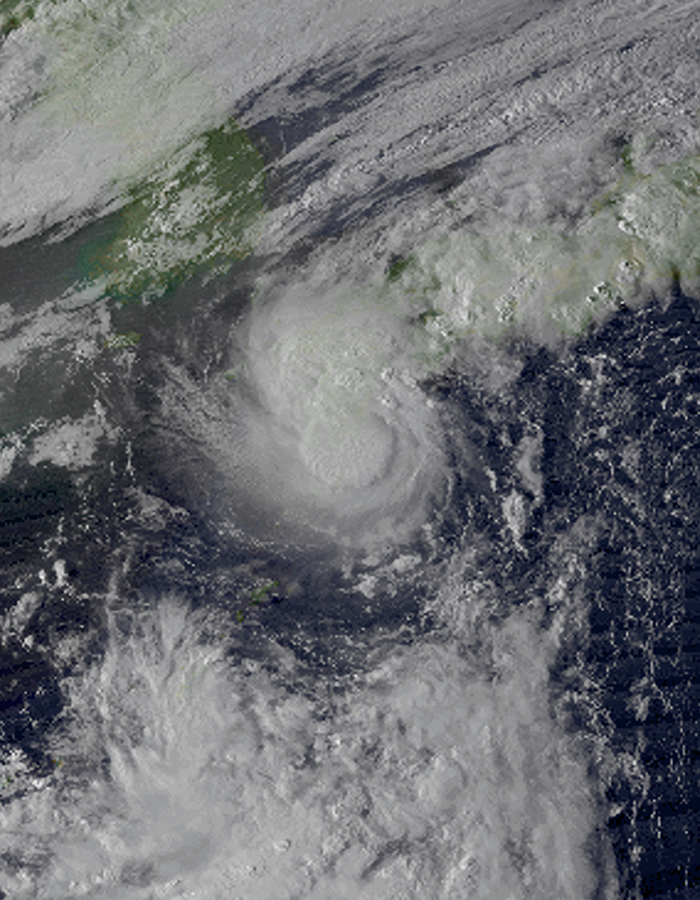
- Zia at peak intensity over Japan on September 14, 1999

Meteorological history
- Formed: September 11, 1999
- Dissipated: September 15, 1999

Tropical storm
- 10-minute sustained (JMA)
- Highest winds: 85 km/h (50 mph)
- Lowest pressure: 985 hPa (mbar); 29.09 inHg

Tropical storm
- 1-minute sustained (SSHWS/JTWC)
- Highest winds: 85 km/h (50 mph)

Overall effects
- Fatalities: 9 total
- Damage: $18.5 million (1999 USD)
- Areas affected: Japan
- IBTrACS
- Part of the 1999 Pacific typhoon season

Tropical Storm Zia (international designation: 9916, Taiwan: 琪亚) was the 22nd tropical cyclone of the 1999 Pacific typhoon season and the first to make landfall in Japan that year. Originating from a convective area east of the Mariana Islands in September 1999, the cyclone strengthened as it moved northwest, becoming a tropical storm on September 13. It made landfall in southern Miyazaki Prefecture, Kyushu, on September 14, then turned northeast and transitioned into an extratropical cyclone.

In its later stages, Zia brought severe weather to Japan from Kyushu to the Tohoku region, resulting in 7 deaths, 11 injuries, and 1 missing person. Urban flooding occurred in several areas, with over 3,000 homes inundated and 31 buildings damaged to varying degrees. The storm disrupted air, sea, and land transport, with canceled flights, trains, ferries, and shuttle services. In Kamikochi, Matsumoto, Nagano, over 1,300 tourists were stranded. Zia caused approximately ¥2.1 billion (US$19.88 million) in damages in Japan.

Days later, Typhoon Bart made landfall in northern Kumamoto Prefecture, causing significant damage in Japan, with 31 deaths and 1,218 injuries.

== Meteorological history ==
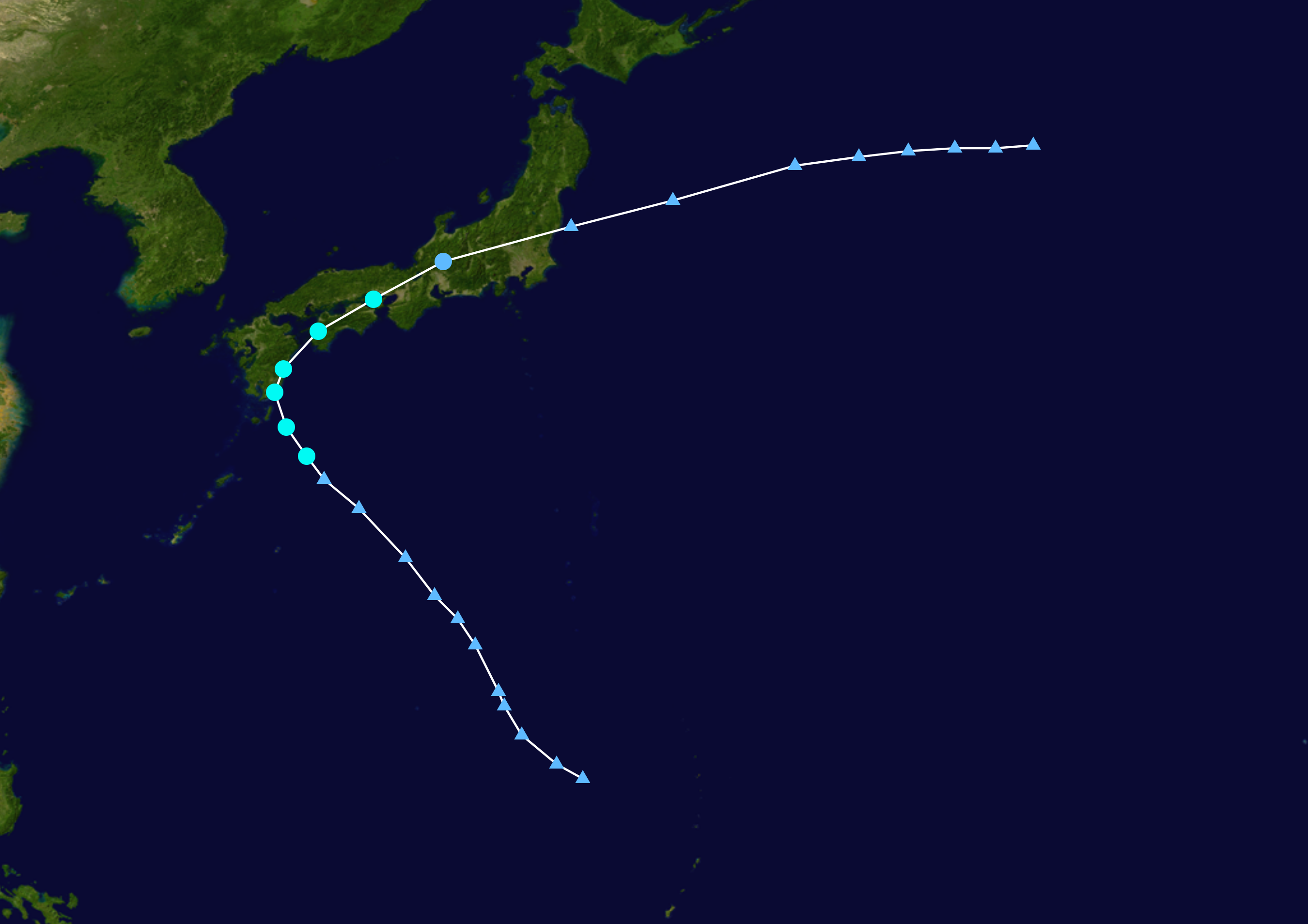
Map plotting the storm's track and intensity, according to the Saffir–Simpson scale Map key Saffir–Simpson scale Tropical depression (≤38 mph, ≤62 km/h) Tropical storm (39–73 mph, 63–118 km/h) Category 1 (74–95 mph, 119–153 km/h) Category 2 (96–110 mph, 154–177 km/h) Category 3 (111–129 mph, 178–208 km/h) Category 4 (130–156 mph, 209–251 km/h) Category 5 (≥157 mph, ≥252 km/h) Unknown Storm type Tropical cyclone Subtropical cyclone Extratropical cyclone, remnant low, tropical disturbance, or monsoon depression

On September 9, 1999, a convective area formed east of the Mariana Islands. Satellite imagery showed a tropical upper tropospheric trough (TUTT) northwest of the system, which aided convective development, with upper-level outflow covering the low-level circulation. Two days later, the system moved to the northwest side of Guam, near the eastern edge of a monsoon trough, with a more defined low-level circulation center. The next day, as it continued northwest, the Joint Typhoon Warning Center (JTWC) issued a Tropical Cyclone Formation Alert at 10:00 UTC. On the morning of September 13, deep convection was sheared off by a vertical wind shear from an anticyclone to the north, exposing the low-level circulation center, leading the JTWC to cancel the alert at 06:00 UTC.

That evening, satellite imagery indicated the low-level circulation center had shifted southward, with deep convection redeveloping and covering the center, increasing the likelihood of storm formation. The JTWC reissued a formation alert. Although the Dvorak technique estimated winds at 25 knots, nearby ships reported winds of 35 knots. Consequently, at 18:00 UTC, the JTWC upgraded the tropical disturbance directly to a tropical storm, naming it Zia, located approximately 150 nautical miles (280 km; 170 mi) south-southeast of Kyushu, Japan. By midnight on September 14, satellite estimates suggested Zia's winds increased from 35 to 45 knots, though the JTWC, based on ship reports, maintained the intensity at 35 knots. The system had developed into a symmetric storm with low-level cloud lines east of the circulation center. The Japan Meteorological Agency (JMA) issued warnings at 06:00 UTC, estimating winds at 45 knots (10-minute average).

At 08:00 UTC on September 14, Zia made landfall in southern Miyazaki Prefecture. It then turned northeast, making a second landfall in Uwajima, Ehime Prefecture, that evening, crossing northern Shikoku. Early on September 15, Zia made landfall in Akashi, Hyogo Prefecture, traversing the Kinki region and Chubu region, gradually weakening and losing tropical characteristics. By morning, it weakened to a tropical depression in Iida, Nagano Prefecture, and later that day, near Iwaki, Fukushima Prefecture, it merged with a frontal system, transitioning into an extratropical cyclone.

== Impact ==
Zia brought heavy rain across Honshu and the Tohoku region. In Nichinan, Miyazaki, near the landfall point, a minimum pressure of 985.8 hPa was recorded. In Kochi Prefecture, Cape Muroto recorded sustained winds of 26.5 m/s, with a maximum gust of 36.9 m/s in Sukumo. The heaviest rainfall was in Takayama Village, Gifu Prefecture (now part of Gujo), (Note: The village merged into Gujo in 2004.) with 519 mm. In Tokushima Prefecture's Kito Village (now part of Naka), (Note: The village merged into Naka in 2005.) 372 mm fell on September 14 alone.

In Oita Prefecture, heavy rain impacted central and southern areas, suspending or restricting services on the Hohi Main Line and canceling seven flights. In Miyazaki Prefecture, towns experienced urban flooding, and landslides blocked several national highways. Agricultural damage affected 535 acres, with losses exceeding ¥200 million.

In Kochi Prefecture, heavy rain damaged 56 roads, and parts of the Kochi Expressway were closed. Rail services stopped, and All Nippon Airways canceled four flights. Forestry facilities suffered 80 instances of damage, with losses over ¥700 million. Ehime Prefecture saw severe impacts, with Saijo recording 127 mm of rain in one hour on September 14, exceeding previous records by over twofold. Agricultural and forestry losses neared ¥8 billion, with 208 forestry sites and 85 hectares of farmland damaged. Over 600 buildings were flooded, four bridges were destroyed, and 150 roads were damaged. Widespread mudflows occurred in Saijo and Tanhara, and in Sendai, a house and a warehouse were damaged, forcing 17 people from seven households to evacuate. Additionally, 207 communication lines were disrupted, causing temporary communication difficulties.

In Kyoto Prefecture, over 100 homes were flooded, and eight were damaged. In Fushimi Ward, a suspected tornado tore off rooftops, causing power outages for over 1,000 households. At Kansai International Airport in Izumisano, Osaka, Zia caused the cancellation of 17 flights to Tokushima, Miyazaki, and other destinations. Gusts of 26 m/s led to a three-hour closure of the Kansai Airport Line. In Hyogo Prefecture, heavy rain triggered landslides, including a 3-meter-wide, 40-meter-high slide in Sayo. In Kobe, the Shinminato River's rising water levels prompted the Fire and Disaster Management Agency to issue evacuation warnings for over 6,000 households, affecting nearly 15,000 people, with the Japan Self-Defense Forces assisting in flood response. The Sanyo Shinkansen between Himeji and Okayama slowed, causing delays of up to 40 minutes. Ferries and high-speed boats from Port of Kobe to Awaji Island and Kansai International Airport were canceled, and Tajima Airport canceled two afternoon flights. In Tottori Prefecture, lightning caused power outages for over 3,000 households in Kurayoshi, and the Yonago Expressway implemented traffic controls and speed limits due to strong winds.

In Nagoya, Aichi Prefecture, over 250 homes were flooded, and public facilities like riverbanks were damaged, with losses nearing ¥200 million. In Ono, Fukui Prefecture, a 40-meter-long, 8-meter-wide, 1.5-meter-high mudflow blocked Japan National Route 158. The Hokuriku Expressway in Shiga Prefecture closed due to poor visibility from heavy rain. In Gifu Prefecture, landslides in Furukawa and Miyagawa caused three deaths. In Kani, a 19-year-old woman went missing after her car fell into a river. The Fire and Disaster Management Agency issued evacuation advisories for over 3,000 people in Gifu, with 3,646 evacuating. In Kamikochi, Matsumoto, Nagano, landslides blocked access roads, stranding over 1,300 people. In Fukushima Prefecture, 560 households in Fukushima lost power, and flooding occurred in Nihonmatsu and Koriyama. In Miyagi Prefecture, heavy rain caused over ¥300 million in agricultural losses, and the Yamagata Shinkansen and Joban Line temporarily suspended operations.

== See also ==
- Tropical cyclones in 1999
- Tropical Storm Peipah (2025) - a storm of similar intensity that made landfall in a similar area
