= Coastal flood advisory =

Flood advisory in the US

A coastal flood advisory is issued by the National Weather Service of the United States when coastal flooding along the coast of the Atlantic Ocean, Pacific Ocean, Arctic Ocean, or the Gulf of Mexico is occurring or imminent, but does not pose a serious threat to lives or property, but rather will simply pose a nuisance to people in the affected area. The flooding must be due to water being forced from the nearby body of water onto land, and not from rainfall. Nor'easters, hurricanes, tropical storms, and thunderstorms can all lead to the issuance of a coastal flood advisory.

== Example ==
The following is an example of a coastal flood advisory issued by the National Weather Service office in Taunton, Massachusetts.

062
WHUS41 KBOX 030838
CFWBOX

Coastal Hazard Message
National Weather Service Boston/Norton MA
338 AM EST Mon Jan 3 2022

MAZ007-015-016-019-022>024-031900-
/O.CAN.KBOX.CF.S.0001.220103T1400Z-220103T1900Z/
/O.NEW.KBOX.CF.Y.0001.220103T1400Z-220103T1900Z/
Eastern Essex MA-Suffolk MA-Eastern Norfolk MA-
Eastern Plymouth MA-Barnstable MA-Dukes MA-Nantucket MA-
338 AM EST Mon Jan 3 2022

...COASTAL FLOOD ADVISORY IN EFFECT FROM 9 AM THIS MORNING TO
2 PM EST THIS AFTERNOON...

* WHAT...One to two feet of inundation above ground level
  expected in low-lying areas near shorelines and tidal
  waterways (3.3 to 13.0 feet Mean Lower Low Water).

* WHERE...Eastern Essex MA, Suffolk MA, Eastern Norfolk MA,
  Eastern Plymouth MA, Barnstable MA, Dukes MA and Nantucket MA
  Counties.

* WHEN...From 9 AM this morning to 2 PM EST this afternoon.

* IMPACTS...Coastal flooding is expected along the North Shore
  from Marblehead northward along the coast to Newburyport. The
  combination of high tides and a modest storm surge will result in
  flooding of some immediate coastal roads and some road
  closures are anticipated. Minor coastal flooding begins on
  Easy Street in Nantucket. Minor coastal flooding occurs along
  Morrissey Boulevard in Boston.

PRECAUTIONARY/PREPAREDNESS ACTIONS...

If travel is required, allow extra time as some roads may be
closed. Do not drive around barricades or through water of
unknown depth. Take the necessary actions to protect flood-prone
property.

&&

&&

Time of high total tides are approximate to the nearest hour.

Merrimack River near Newburyport MA
MLLW Categories - Minor 11.0 ft, Moderate 12.0 ft, Major 13.5 ft
MHHW Categories - Minor 1.5 ft, Moderate 2.5 ft, Major 4.0 ft

             Total      Total    Departure
 Day/Time    Tide       Tide     from Norm   Waves    Flood
            ft MLLW    ft MHHW       ft       ft      Impact
 --------  ---------  ---------  ---------  -------  --------
 03/11 AM  11.0/11.5   1.5/ 2.0   1.0/ 1.5     1      Minor
 04/12 AM   9.4/ 9.9  -0.2/ 0.3   1.2/ 1.7     1       None
 04/12 PM  10.7/11.2   1.2/ 1.7   0.8/ 1.3     1      Minor
 05/01 AM   8.5/ 9.0  -1.1/-0.6   0.2/ 0.7     3       None

Gloucester Harbor
MLLW Categories - Minor 11.5 ft, Moderate 13.0 ft, Major 15.0 ft
MHHW Categories - Minor 2.0 ft, Moderate 3.5 ft, Major 5.5 ft

             Total      Total    Departure
 Day/Time    Tide       Tide     from Norm   Waves    Flood
            ft MLLW    ft MHHW       ft       ft      Impact
 --------  ---------  ---------  ---------  -------  --------
 03/11 AM  12.3/12.8   2.7/ 3.2   1.0/ 1.5    3-5     Minor
 04/12 AM  10.7/11.2   1.2/ 1.7   1.2/ 1.7    6-7      None
 04/12 PM  11.9/12.4   2.3/ 2.8   0.7/ 1.1     4      Minor
 05/01 AM   9.8/10.3   0.2/ 0.8   0.2/ 0.7    3-4      None

Revere
MLLW Categories - Minor 12.5 ft, Moderate 14.5 ft, Major 16.0 ft
MHHW Categories - Minor 2.6 ft, Moderate 4.6 ft, Major 6.1 ft

             Total      Total    Departure
 Day/Time    Tide       Tide     from Norm   Waves    Flood
            ft MLLW    ft MHHW       ft       ft      Impact
 --------  ---------  ---------  ---------  -------  --------
 03/11 AM  13.0/13.5   3.1/ 3.6   1.2/ 1.7     1      Minor
 04/12 AM  11.3/11.8   1.4/ 1.9   1.3/ 1.8     1       None
 04/12 PM  12.7/13.2   2.7/ 3.2   0.9/ 1.4     1      Minor
 05/01 AM  10.3/10.8   0.4/ 0.9   0.2/ 0.8     2       None

Boston Harbor
MLLW Categories - Minor 12.5 ft, Moderate 14.5 ft, Major 16.0 ft
MHHW Categories - Minor 2.4 ft, Moderate 4.4 ft, Major 5.9 ft

             Total      Total    Departure
 Day/Time    Tide       Tide     from Norm   Waves    Flood
            ft MLLW    ft MHHW       ft       ft      Impact
 --------  ---------  ---------  ---------  -------  --------
 03/11 AM  13.0/13.5   2.8/ 3.4   1.2/ 1.7    2-4     Minor
 04/12 AM  11.2/11.7   1.1/ 1.6   1.2/ 1.7     4       None
 04/12 PM  12.6/13.1   2.5/ 3.0   0.9/ 1.4     3      Minor
 05/01 AM  10.4/10.9   0.2/ 0.8   0.4/ 0.9     2       None

Scituate MA
MLLW Categories - Minor 11.5 ft, Moderate 13.5 ft, Major 15.5 ft
MHHW Categories - Minor 1.8 ft, Moderate 3.8 ft, Major 5.8 ft

             Total      Total    Departure
 Day/Time    Tide       Tide     from Norm   Waves    Flood
            ft MLLW    ft MHHW       ft       ft      Impact
 --------  ---------  ---------  ---------  -------  --------
 03/11 AM  12.5/13.0   2.7/ 3.2   1.1/ 1.6    3-5     Minor
 04/12 AM  10.8/11.3   1.1/ 1.6   1.3/ 1.8    6-7      None
 04/12 PM  12.1/12.6   2.3/ 2.8   0.8/ 1.3     4      Minor
 05/01 AM   9.9/10.4   0.2/ 0.7   0.2/ 0.8     3       None

Chatham - South side
MLLW Categories - Minor 9.0 ft, Moderate 10.5 ft, Major 11.5 ft
MHHW Categories - Minor 4.5 ft, Moderate 6.0 ft, Major 7.0 ft

             Total      Total    Departure
 Day/Time    Tide       Tide     from Norm   Waves    Flood
            ft MLLW    ft MHHW       ft       ft      Impact
 --------  ---------  ---------  ---------  -------  --------
 03/12 PM   6.2/ 6.7   1.7/ 2.2   1.1/ 1.6     4       None
 04/01 AM   4.9/ 5.4   0.4/ 0.9   1.2/ 1.7    6-7      None
 04/01 PM   5.9/ 6.4   1.4/ 1.9   0.9/ 1.4    3-4      None

Wings Neck
MLLW Categories - Minor 6.5 ft, Moderate 9.0 ft, Major 11.5 ft
MHHW Categories - Minor 2.1 ft, Moderate 4.6 ft, Major 7.1 ft

             Total      Total    Departure
 Day/Time    Tide       Tide     from Norm   Waves    Flood
            ft MLLW    ft MHHW       ft       ft      Impact
 --------  ---------  ---------  ---------  -------  --------
 03/08 AM   5.9/ 6.4   1.5/ 2.0   0.8/ 1.3    1-2      None
 03/08 PM   4.7/ 5.2   0.4/ 0.9   0.6/ 1.1    4-5      None
 04/09 AM   5.7/ 6.2   1.4/ 1.9   0.8/ 1.3    2-3      None
 04/09 PM   4.9/ 5.4   0.5/ 1.0   0.6/ 1.1     1       None

Provincetown Harbor
MLLW Categories - Minor 13.0 ft, Moderate 14.0 ft, Major 15.0 ft
MHHW Categories - Minor 2.9 ft, Moderate 3.9 ft, Major 4.9 ft

             Total      Total    Departure
 Day/Time    Tide       Tide     from Norm   Waves    Flood
            ft MLLW    ft MHHW       ft       ft      Impact
 --------  ---------  ---------  ---------  -------  --------
 03/11 AM  12.6/13.1   2.5/ 3.0   1.0/ 1.5     4      Minor
 04/12 AM  11.0/11.5   0.9/ 1.4   1.2/ 1.7     7       None
 04/12 PM  12.1/12.6   2.0/ 2.5   0.6/ 1.1    4-5      None
 05/01 AM  10.1/10.6   0.0/ 0.5   0.2/ 0.7     3       None

Buzzards Bay at Woods Hole
MLLW Categories - Minor 5.5 ft, Moderate 7.0 ft, Major 8.5 ft
MHHW Categories - Minor 3.5 ft, Moderate 5.0 ft, Major 6.5 ft

             Total      Total    Departure
 Day/Time    Tide       Tide     from Norm   Waves    Flood
            ft MLLW    ft MHHW       ft       ft      Impact
 --------  ---------  ---------  ---------  -------  --------
 03/08 AM   3.9/ 4.4   1.9/ 2.3   0.8/ 1.3     2       None
 03/09 PM   3.5/ 4.0   1.5/ 2.0   1.0/ 1.5     5       None
 04/09 AM   3.7/ 4.2   1.8/ 2.2   0.8/ 1.3    2-3      None
 04/10 PM   3.0/ 3.5   1.0/ 1.5   0.6/ 1.1     1       None

Dennis - Sesuit Harbor
MLLW Categories - Minor 13.0 ft, Moderate 14.5 ft, Major 16.0 ft
MHHW Categories - Minor 2.5 ft, Moderate 4.0 ft, Major 5.5 ft

             Total      Total    Departure
 Day/Time    Tide       Tide     from Norm   Waves    Flood
            ft MLLW    ft MHHW       ft       ft      Impact
 --------  ---------  ---------  ---------  -------  --------
 03/11 AM  13.4/13.9   2.8/ 3.4   1.2/ 1.7     3      Minor
 04/12 AM  11.9/12.4   1.4/ 1.9   1.5/ 2.0     6       None
 04/12 PM  12.8/13.3   2.2/ 2.7   0.7/ 1.1    3-4     Minor
 05/01 AM  10.7/11.2   0.2/ 0.7   0.2/ 0.8    1-2      None

Chatham MA - East Coast
MLLW Categories - Minor 9.0 ft, Moderate 11.5 ft, Major 13.0 ft
MHHW Categories - Minor 1.3 ft, Moderate 3.8 ft, Major 5.3 ft

             Total      Total    Departure
 Day/Time    Tide       Tide     from Norm   Waves    Flood
            ft MLLW    ft MHHW       ft       ft      Impact
 --------  ---------  ---------  ---------  -------  --------
 03/12 PM   7.1/ 7.6  -0.7/-0.2   1.2/ 1.7     5       None
 04/01 AM   6.0/ 6.5  -1.8/-1.3   1.4/ 1.9    7-8      None
 04/01 PM   6.7/ 7.2  -1.1/-0.6   0.8/ 1.3    5-6      None

Sandwich Harbor
MLLW Categories - Minor 12.0 ft, Moderate 14.0 ft, Major 15.0 ft
MHHW Categories - Minor 1.7 ft, Moderate 3.7 ft, Major 4.7 ft

             Total      Total    Departure
 Day/Time    Tide       Tide     from Norm   Waves    Flood
            ft MLLW    ft MHHW       ft       ft      Impact
 --------  ---------  ---------  ---------  -------  --------
 03/11 AM  11.9/12.4   1.6/ 2.0   1.2/ 1.7    3-4     Minor
 04/12 AM  10.4/10.9   0.1/ 0.6   1.4/ 1.9    6-7      None
 04/12 PM  11.3/11.8   1.0/ 1.5   0.7/ 1.1    3-4      None
 05/01 AM   9.3/ 9.8  -1.1/-0.6   0.2/ 0.8     2       None

Vineyard Haven
MLLW Categories - Minor 5.0 ft, Moderate 6.5 ft, Major 8.5 ft
MHHW Categories - Minor 3.0 ft, Moderate 4.5 ft, Major 6.5 ft

             Total      Total    Departure
 Day/Time    Tide       Tide     from Norm   Waves    Flood
            ft MLLW    ft MHHW       ft       ft      Impact
 --------  ---------  ---------  ---------  -------  --------
 03/12 PM   3.1/ 3.6   1.1/ 1.6   1.1/ 1.6    2-3      None
 04/12 AM   3.2/ 3.7   1.2/ 1.7   1.5/ 2.0    4-5      None
 04/12 PM   2.7/ 3.2   0.8/ 1.3   0.9/ 1.4     2       None
 05/01 AM   2.1/ 2.6   0.1/ 0.6   0.4/ 0.9     1       None

Nantucket Harbor
MLLW Categories - Minor 5.0 ft, Moderate 6.5 ft, Major 8.0 ft
MHHW Categories - Minor 1.4 ft, Moderate 2.9 ft, Major 4.4 ft

             Total      Total    Departure
 Day/Time    Tide       Tide     from Norm   Waves    Flood
            ft MLLW    ft MHHW       ft       ft      Impact
 --------  ---------  ---------  ---------  -------  --------
 03/12 PM   5.2/ 5.7   1.6/ 2.0   1.2/ 1.7    3-4     Minor
 04/01 AM   4.5/ 5.0   0.9/ 1.4   1.6/ 2.0    5-7      None
 04/01 PM   4.7/ 5.2   1.2/ 1.7   0.8/ 1.3    3-4     Minor

&&

$$

Nocera

== See also ==
- Severe weather terminology (United States)
