= Tropical Storm Maria (2024) =

Pacific severe tropical storm in 2024

Severe Tropical Storm Maria
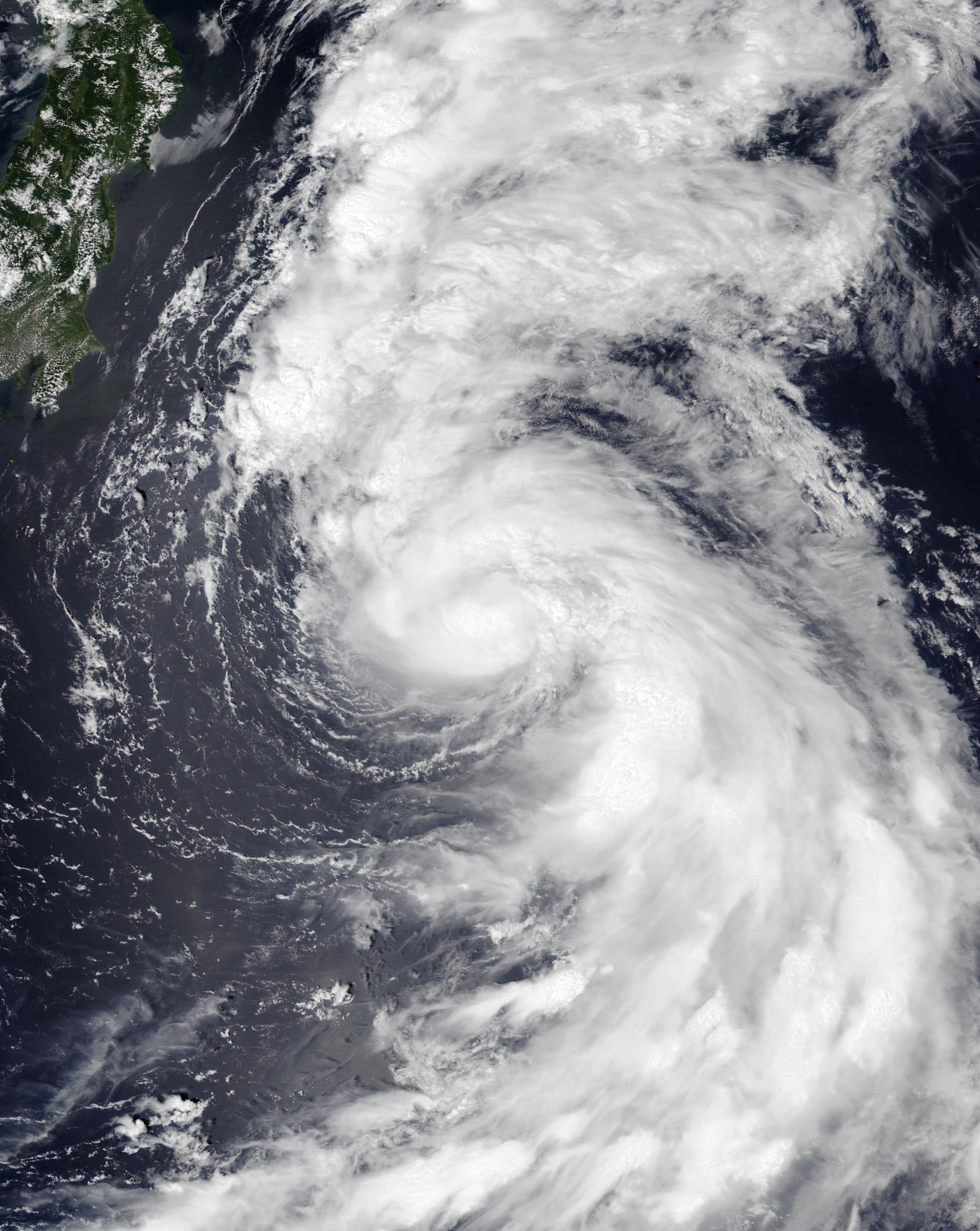
- Maria shortly after peak intensity, while approaching Japan on August 9

Meteorological history
- Formed: August 5, 2024
- Dissipated: August 14, 2024

Severe tropical storm
- 10-minute sustained (JMA)
- Highest winds: 100 km/h (65 mph)
- Lowest pressure: 980 hPa (mbar); 28.94 inHg

Category 1-equivalent typhoon
- 1-minute sustained (SSHWS/JTWC)
- Highest winds: 130 km/h (80 mph)
- Lowest pressure: 969 hPa (mbar); 28.61 inHg

Overall effects
- Casualties: None
- Damage: $22.9 million (2024 USD)
- Areas affected: Bonin Islands, Japan
- IBTrACS
- Part of the 2024 Pacific typhoon season

Severe Tropical Storm Maria (Note: The name Maria (Chamorro: Maria, [mæɾiæ]) was contributed by the United States and is a feminine given name in Chamorro.) was the third tropical cyclone to make landfall over the Pacific coast of the Tōhoku region of Japan—behind only 2016's Lionrock and 2021's Nepartak—in early August 2024. Forming as the fifth named storm of the annual typhoon season on August 5, Maria further intensified into a severe tropical storm and later into a minimal typhoon on August 8. It soon reached its peak intensity that day, with 10-minute sustained winds of 100 km/h (65 mph) and a minimum barometric pressure of 980 hPa (28.94 inHg). However, the storm's structure became asymmetric to the northeast due to the shielding effect of the Japanese Alps on its western periphery. The storm made landfall Ōfunato, a city in Iwate Prefecture, Japan with winds of 85 km/h (50 mph) before traversing northern Honshu and emerging into the Sea of Japan on August 12. It continued to be monitored until it was last noted on August 14.

In advance of Maria, the Japan Meteorological Agency issued warnings about potential landslides, overflowing rivers, and flooding in low-lying areas, as well as strong winds. Record-breaking rainfall was observed in Iwate Prefecture, with Kuji receiving 19 inches (482.6 mm) and Otsuchi 12.6 inches (320.0 mm)—nearly double the usual amount for the month—prompting the evacuation of around 2,000 residents. Several homes were flooded in Iwaizumi, Kamaishi, and Miyako, and a Level 5 emergency warning was declared for the Osanai and Kokuji regions in Kuji City, Iwate Prefecture. No fatalities or injuries were reported, and the damage from Maria was US$22.9 million; however, Japan was impacted just days later by a more powerful cyclone named Typhoon Ampil.

== Meteorological history ==
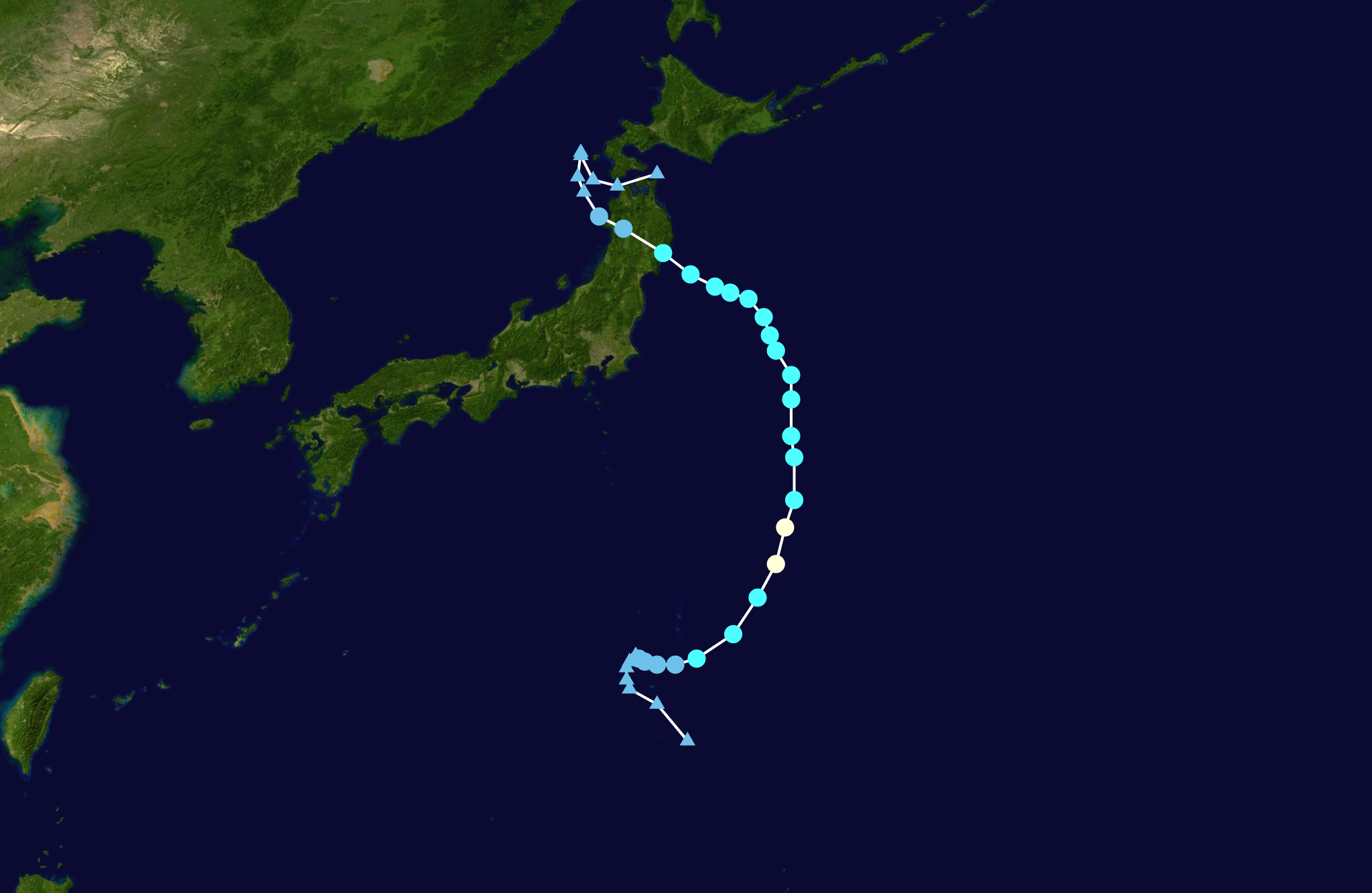
Map plotting the storm's track and intensity, according to the Saffir–Simpson scale Map key Saffir–Simpson scale Tropical depression (≤38 mph, ≤62 km/h) Tropical storm (39–73 mph, 63–118 km/h) Category 1 (74–95 mph, 119–153 km/h) Category 2 (96–110 mph, 154–177 km/h) Category 3 (111–129 mph, 178–208 km/h) Category 4 (130–156 mph, 209–251 km/h) Category 5 (≥157 mph, ≥252 km/h) Unknown Storm type Tropical cyclone Subtropical cyclone Extratropical cyclone, remnant low, tropical disturbance, or monsoon depression

The origins of Severe Tropical Storm Maria can be traced back to August 5, when the Japan Meteorological Agency (JMA) reported that a tropical depression had formed. Later that day, the United States Joint Typhoon Warning Center (JTWC) began tracking it, noting the depression was in an environment with low to moderate wind shear, warm sea surface temperatures, and good equatorward outflow aloft. At 09:00 UTC on August 6, the JTWC issued a tropical cyclone formation alert on the disturbance, which was located 423 mi (682 km) north-northwest of Iwo Jima, along the eastern periphery of the monsoon gyre, prior to it being designated as 06W. The development of a central dense overcast and a ragged eye feature signified its intensification into a tropical storm, leading the JMA to name it Maria on August 7. Maria then turned northeastward, moving along the northwestern edge of a subtropical ridge, and intensified into a severe tropical storm on August 8 due to a favorable environment for development.

Maria's structure improved, featuring spiral bands of deep convection and a well-defined symmetrical circulation. Around 18:00 UTC, the JMA estimated peak 10-minute sustained winds of 100 km/h (65 mph) and a minimum barometric pressure of 980 hPa (28.94 inHg). Concurrently, the JTWC then reported that Maria had rapidly intensified into a minimal typhoon, with 1-minute sustained winds of 130 km/h (80 mph), due to strong equatorward and poleward outflow. Maria's wind field became more asymmetric, with its associated convection shifting northward, causing Maria to weaken into a tropical storm on August 9, with deep convection becoming displaced to the northeast of an increasingly exposed low-level circulation center. However, satellite imagery later revealed that convection was wrapping around the system's defined low-level circulation, and a partial eyewall developed in the western semicircle of the center. Unfavorable upper-level winds associated with the subtropical jet stream began to take their toll on Maria. The storm had developed a compact core with an enhanced convection structure at its center, while deep convection—an early sign of a developing ragged eye—had started to encircle the system's center. However, shortly afterward, the storm's structure became asymmetric to the northeast due to the shielding effect of the Japanese Alps on its western periphery. At 00:00 UTC on August 12, the storm made landfall in Ōfunato, a city in Iwate Prefecture, Japan with winds of 85 km/h (50 mph) before traversing northern Honshu and emerging into the Sea of Japan. This makes Maria the third tropical cyclone to make landfall over the Pacific coast of the Tōhoku region of Japan since the JMA began record-keeping in 1951. The others were Typhoon Lionrock in 2016 and Tropical Storm Nepartak in 2021. Soon after, the JTWC issued its final warning on the system as it became an exposed circulation center, while the JMA continued to monitor it until it was last noted on August 14.

== Preparations and impacts ==
Maria making landfall in Japan on August 12.

The Japan Meteorological Agency warned on potential landslides and overflowing rivers and flooding in low-lying areas, and strong winds. A Level 5 emergency warning was issued for the Osanai and Kokuji regions in Kuji City, Iwate Prefecture. The East Japan Railway Company also announced the suspension of trips to Tōhoku, Akita, and Yamagata via the Shinkansen due to rainfall from Maria. Due to Maria's arrival, Japan Airlines announced the cancellation of 191 domestic flights. According to East Japan Railway Co., bullet train services between Akita and Morioka stations on the Akita Shinkansen Line were suspended on the afternoon of August 12. Strong winds resulted in trees falling on the roads of Ōfunato in Iwate Prefecture. Community centers in Kesennuma of the neighbouring Miyagi Prefecture were set up as evacuation centres.

Record-breaking rainfall in Iwate Prefecture saw 18.5 inches (469.9 mm) of rain in 48 hours. This was the most in the region since the JMA began keeping reliable meteorological records in 1978. Flooding affected homes in Iwaizumi and Kamaishi. Record-breaking rainfall totals were observed in Iwate Prefecture, reaching 19 inches (482.6 mm) in Kuji and 12.6 inches (320.0 mm) in Ōtsuchi, nearly double the average rainfall amount for August. Officials announced an emergency water release at the city's at Taki Dam to prevent it from completely filling up due to rainfall from Maria. An evacuation order was issued for the city of Kuji. Over 8,300 people were given the highest warning in the town of Iwaizumi, Iwate. Preparation for the storm was adequate, as over 2,000 people took shelter as the storm made landfall. Maria caused power outages in approximately 300 households in Iwate Prefecture. The Fire and Disaster Management Agency reported that there were no damages or injuries associated with Maria. Damage across the prefecture reached 3.37 billion yen (US$22.9 million). Prime Minister Fumio Kishida assured that the government would rapidly provide information and aid to the communities in the affected regions.

== See also ==
- Other storms of the same name
- Weather of 2024
- Tropical cyclones in 2024
- Typhoon Jongdari – had a similar track to Maria.
