= List of Japan tornadoes =

The Asian country of Japan experiences roughly 20 tornadoes per year. In 2006, a tornado struck Saroma, Hokkaido, killing nine people, becoming the country's deadliest tornado. A powerful tornado in 2025, spawned by Tropical Storm Peipah, killed one person.

== Climatology ==
Data about tornadoes in Japan is collected by the Japan Meteorological Agency (JMA), who use a modified version of the Enhanced Fujita Scale (EF-Scale) known as the Japanese Enhanced Fujita Scale (sometimes abbreviation JEF-Scale).

The country experiences 20.5 tornadoes per year, on average. The most active month is September, and the least active is March. About 46% of Japanese tornadoes are associated with an extratropical cyclone, while a further 20% are associated with tropical cyclones. Waterspouts are somewhat common off the coast of Japan, some of which may come ashore and become weak tornadoes. However, under the right atmospheric conditions, supercell thunderstorms can form and produce stronger tornadoes in the country. (Note: Waterspouts that remained over the ocean without making landfall are not included in this article.)

== Events ==
=== Pre-2000 ===
Event	Date	Area	Tornadoes	Casualties	Notes	Sources
Miyazaki tornado	26 September 1881	Miyazaki, Miyazaki Prefecture, Japan	≥1	16 fatalities	Deadliest Japanese tornado; destroyed Miyazaki Elementary School	
Yodobashi Town tornado	23 September 1903	Yodobashi Town, Tokyo Prefecture, Japan	≥1	10 fatalities, 14 injuries	Struck an elementary school in Toyotoma County	
Toyohashi City tornado	28 November 1941	Toyohashi City, Aichi Prefecture, Japan	≥1	12 fatalities, 177 injuries	347 houses completely destroyed or heavily damaged	
Tomiye City tornado	10 November 1957	Tomiye City, Nagasaki Prefecture, Japan	≥1	6 fatalities, 8 injuries		
Azuma village tornado	2 July 1962	Aruma village, Chiba Prefecture, Japan	≥1	2 fatalities		
Hamamatsu tornado	26 August 1962	Hamamatsu, Shizuoka Prefecture, Japan	≥1	None	168 houses severely damaged	
1964 Tokyo tornado	24 May 1964	Southwestern Tokyo, Japan	–	None	480 houses damaged	
Ooami-Shirasato town tornado	28 October 1967	Ooami-Shirasato town, Chiba Prefecture, Japan	-	2 fatalities, 2 injuries		
Sashima town tornado	23 August 1969	Sashima town, Ibaraki Prefecture, Japan	≥1	2 fatalities, 107 injuries		
1978 Tokyo tornado	28 February 1978	Japan	≥1	36 injuries	Longest path length Japanese tornado at 41.2 km (25.6 mi) Damaged 289 homes and derailed a train	
Hachirohgata village tornado	11 January 1987	Hachirohgata village, Akita Prefecture, Japan	≥1	None	Longest duration Japanese tornado at 41 minutes	
Mobara tornado	11 December 1990	Mobara, Chiba Prefecture, Japan		1 death, 78 injuries (Ted Fujita lists 60 injuries)	Violent tornado damaged 1000 homes, 82 completely destroyed. Officially rated as F3 but rated as F4 by Fujita-based from one home that was lofted from its foundation and some contextuals	
Toyohashi City tornadoes	24 September 1999	Toyohashi City, Aichi Prefecture, Japan	4	262 injuries	F3 tornado	

=== 2000s ===
Event	Date	Area	Tornadoes	Casualties	Notes	Sources
Nobeoka, Miyazaki tornado	18 September 2006	Nobeoka, Miyazaki Prefecture (Kyūshū), Japan	–	3 fatalities, 100 injuries	2nd deadliest tornado in recent Japanese history	
2006 Saroma tornado	7 November 2006	Saroma, Hokkaidō, Japan		9 fatalities, 26 injuries	F3 tornado. Deadliest tornado in recent Japanese history	
Tsukuba, Ibaraki Prefecture tornado	6 May 2012	Tsukuba, Ibaraki Prefecture, Japan	-	1 fatality, 52 injuries	Japan's worst tornado since November 2006; 890 houses were damaged. Rated F3.	
Sanba (Karen)	18 September 2012	Japan	Several	None		
Saitama Prefecture tornado	2 September 2013	Saitama Prefecture, Japan	-	63 injuries	F2 tornado	
Tropical Storm Toraji	4 September 2013	Japan	3	None	Strongest reported tornado at F1 intensity.	
Typhoon Man-yi	15–16 September 2013	Japan	10	10 injuries	Ten F0 and F1 tornadoes touched down, damaging over 900 homes.	
Typhoon Hagibis	12 October 2019	Ichihara, Chiba Prefecture	1	1 fatality, 5 injuries		

==== 2020 ====
In 2020, 11 tornadoes were confirmed across Japan. No injuries or fatalities occurred as a result of any tornado that year. In July, a nearly stagnant baiu front brought record-breaking amounts of precipitation to Southern and Central Japan. The warm, moist air brought by this system created a highly unstable atmosphere, allowing the formation of cumulonimbus clouds that spawned four tornadoes throughout the month.

Confirmed tornadoes in 2020
JEFU	JEF0	JEF1	JEF2	JEF3	JEF4	JEF5
2	6	3	0	0	0	0

===== January 8 event =====
List of confirmed tornadoes – 2020 January 8
JEF#	Location	Prefecture	Time (JST)	Path length	Max. width	Wind speeds
JEF1	Southern Tano	Kōchi	06:10	0.8 km (0.50 mi)	80 m (87 yd)	45 m/s (100 mph)
JEF1	A tornado damaged roof trusses and peeled roofing materials from a warehouse.					

===== June 16 event =====
List of confirmed tornadoes – 2020 June 16
JEF#	Location	Prefecture	Time (JST)	Path length	Max. width	Wind speeds
JEFU	Eastern Rokkasho (1st tornado)	Aomori	10:30	0.12 km (0.075 mi)	70 m (77 yd)	Unknown
JEFU	Sheet metal roofing from a warehouse broke off, damaging a fishing boat. The damage caused by this tornado was insufficient to provide an estimate of its intensity.					
JEF0	Eastern Rokkasho (2nd tornado)	Aomori	10:30	0.1 km (0.062 mi)	50 m (55 yd)	30 m/s (67 mph)
JEF0	A tornado was confirmed. No information was given regarding damages.					

===== July 8 event =====
List of confirmed tornadoes – 2020 July 8
JEF#	Location	Prefecture	Time (JST)	Path length	Max. width	Wind speeds
JEF0	Utsunomiya to Haga	Tochigi	10:40	0.7 km (0.43 mi)	90 m (98 yd)	35 m/s (78 mph)
JEF0	This tornado caused minor roof damage to several structures as well as damage to a stone wall and two vehicles.					

===== July 25 event =====
List of confirmed tornadoes – 2020 July 25
JEF#	Location	Prefecture	Time (JST)	Path length	Max. width	Wind speeds
JEF1	Northern Misato	Saitama	18:30	5.3 km (3.3 mi)	180 m (200 yd)	40 m/s (89 mph)
JEF1	Minor damage was done to 108 houses, including peeling roof tiles, partially destroying fences, and overturning sheds. Signs were collapsed, greenhouses were damaged, and trees were blown down as well. A local power outage is believed to have occurred as a result of the tornado.					

===== July 26 event =====
List of confirmed tornadoes – 2020 July 26
JEF#	Location	Prefecture	Time (JST)	Path length	Max. width	Wind speeds
JEF0	Northeastern Kushimoto	Wakayama	15:40	0.7 km (0.43 mi)	200 m (220 yd)	35 m/s (78 mph)
JEF0	A tornado peeled some roofing materials off several houses and damaged some crops and trees.					

===== July 28 event =====
List of confirmed tornadoes – 2020 July 28
JEF#	Location	Prefecture	Time (JST)	Path length	Max. width	Wind speeds
JEF0	Yaotsu	Gifu	18:35	0.5 km (0.31 mi)	70 m (77 yd)	30 m/s (67 mph)
JEF0	A tornado caused minor damage to the roofs of homes and carports. A greenhouse had its vinyl covers scattered and trees were uprooted as well.					

===== September 20 event =====
List of confirmed tornadoes – 2020 September 20
JEF#	Location	Prefecture	Time (JST)	Path length	Max. width	Wind speeds
JEF0	Southeastern Rebun	Hokkaido	16:20	0.45 km (0.28 mi)	100 m (110 yd)	30 m/s (67 mph)
JEF0	A waterspout made landfall, lightly damaging roofs.					

===== September 30 event =====
List of confirmed tornadoes – 2020 September 30
JEF#	Location	Prefecture	Time (JST)	Path length	Max. width	Wind speeds
JEFU	Ōzu	Kumamoto	17:10	Unknown	Unknown	Unknown
JEFU	A rotating funnel cloud was spotted, which was classified as a tornado by the JMA. No damage was recorded.					

===== October 22 event =====
List of confirmed tornadoes – 2020 October 22
JEF#	Location	Prefecture	Time (JST)	Path length	Max. width	Wind speeds
JEF0	Shintomi	Miyazaki	08:30	0.7 km (0.43 mi)	30 m (33 yd)	35 m/s (78 mph)
JEF0	A tornado peeled roof tiles from the roofs of homes and partially collapsed a greenhouse structure.					

===== November 20 event =====
List of confirmed tornadoes – 2020 November 20
JEF#	Location	Prefecture	Time (JST)	Path length	Max. width	Wind speeds
JEF1	Southwestern Inami	Wakayama	10:00	2.7 km (1.7 mi)	150 m (160 yd)	40 m/s (89 mph)
JEF1	Several greenhouses and crops were damaged by this tornado, and a carport had some roof tiles blown off.					

==== 2021 ====
in 2021, 12 tornadoes were confirmed across Japan causing 4 injuries and no fatalities.

Confirmed tornadoes in 2021
JEFU	JEF0	JEF1	JEF2	JEF3	JEF4	JEF5
0	6	5	1	0	0	0

===== March 13 event =====
List of confirmed tornadoes – 2021 March 13
JEF#	Location	Prefecture	Time (JST)	Path length	Max. width	Wind speeds
JEF1	Mutsuzawa	Chiba	03:00	3.3 km (2.1 mi)	140 m (150 yd)	40 m/s (89 mph)
JEF1	A tornado caused damage in Mutsuzawa.					

===== May 1 event =====
List of confirmed tornadoes – 2021 May 1
JEF#	Location	Prefecture	Time (JST)	Path length	Max. width	Wind speeds
JEF2	Kikugawa	Shizuoka	06:30	1.1 km (0.68 mi)	220 m (240 yd)	65 m/s (150 mph)
JEF2	A tornado caused damage in Kikugawa injuring 3 people.					

===== June 14 event =====
List of confirmed tornadoes – 2021 June 14
JEF#	Location	Prefecture	Time (JST)	Path length	Max. width	Wind speeds
JEF0	Yokote	Akita	04:15	0.3 km (0.19 mi)	70 m (77 yd)	25 m/s (56 mph)
JEF0	A tornado caused damage in Yokote.					

===== July 21 event =====
List of confirmed tornadoes – 2021 July 21
JEF#	Location	Prefecture	Time (JST)	Path length	Max. width	Wind speeds
JEF0	Shintomi	Miyazaki	18:12	0.8 km (0.50 mi)	100 m (110 yd)	35 m/s (78 mph)
JEF0	A tornado caused damage in Shintomi.					

===== August 9 event =====
List of confirmed tornadoes – 2021 August 9
JEF#	Location	Prefecture	Time (JST)	Path length	Max. width	Wind speeds
JEF1	Toyokawa	Aichi	06:40	3.6 km (2.2 mi)	150 m (160 yd)	40 m/s (89 mph)
JEF1	A tornado caused damage in Toyokawa.					

===== August 17 event =====
List of confirmed tornadoes – 2021 August 17
JEF#	Location	Prefecture	Time (JST)	Path length	Max. width	Wind speeds
JEF1	Yaotsu	Gifu	03:30	2 km (1.2 mi)	210 m (230 yd)	40 m/s (89 mph)
JEF1	A tornado caused damage in Yaotsu.					

===== September 18 event =====
List of confirmed tornadoes – 2021 September 18
JEF#	Location	Prefecture	Time (JST)	Path length	Max. width	Wind speeds
JEF1	Mihama	Aichi	00:04	2.7 km (1.7 mi)	220 m (240 yd)	45 m/s (100 mph)
JEF1	A tornado caused damage in Mihama injuring 1 person.					

===== November 4 event =====
List of confirmed tornadoes – 2021 November 4
JEF#	Location	Prefecture	Time (JST)	Path length	Max. width	Wind speeds
JEF0	Kan'onji	Kagawa	11:40	1.4 km (0.87 mi)	140 m (150 yd)	35 m/s (78 mph)
JEF0	A tornado caused damage in Kan'onji.					

===== November 9 event =====
List of confirmed tornadoes – 2021 November 9
JEF#	Location	Prefecture	Time (JST)	Path length	Max. width	Wind speeds
JEF0	Futtsu	Chiba	13:50	1.9 km (1.2 mi)	250 m (270 yd)	35 m/s (78 mph)
JEF0	A tornado caused damage in Futtsu.					

===== November 10 event =====
List of confirmed tornadoes – 2021 November 10
JEF#	Location	Prefecture	Time (JST)	Path length	Max. width	Wind speeds
JEF0	Hirado	Nagasaki	07:05	0.2 km (0.12 mi)	50 m (55 yd)	25 m/s (56 mph)
JEF0	A tornado caused damage in Hirado.					
JEF0	Nasushiobara	Tochigi	12:50	0.8 km (0.50 mi)	170 m (190 yd)	35 m/s (78 mph)
JEF0	A tornado caused damage in Nasushiobara.					

===== November 30 event =====
List of confirmed tornadoes – 2021 November 30
JEF#	Location	Prefecture	Time (JST)	Path length	Max. width	Wind speeds
JEF1	Higashi Hiki	Nagasaki	14:10	4.2 km (2.6 mi)	100 m (110 yd)	40 m/s (89 mph)
JEF1	A tornado caused damage in Higashi Hiki					

==== 2024 ====
===== January 24 event =====
List of confirmed tornadoes – 2024 January 24
JEF#	Location	Prefecture	Time (JST)	Path length	Max. width	Wind speeds
JEF1	Tsugaru	Aomori	11:40	1.8 km (1.1 mi)	15 m (16 yd)	50 m/s (110 mph)
JEF1	This tornado tracked through urban areas, damaging the roofs and exterior walls of wooden buildings and a temple. Additionally, light damage was done to a garage, a warehouse, and a greenhouse.					

===== March 5 event =====
List of confirmed tornadoes – 2024 March 5
JEF#	Location	Prefecture	Time (JST)	Path length	Max. width	Wind speeds
JEF0	Ie	Okinawa	11:05	0.3 km (0.19 mi)	50 m (55 yd)	30 m/s (67 mph)
JEF0	A waterspout made landfall on Iejima Island, where it broke windows and tree branches.					

===== June 18 event =====
List of confirmed tornadoes – 2024 June 18
JEF#	Location	Prefecture	Time (JST)	Path length	Max. width	Wind speeds
JEF1	Tano	Kōchi	06:30	1.2 km (0.75 mi)	245 m (268 yd)	50 m/s (110 mph)
JEF1	This brief tornado uprooted trees and damaged some structures; exterior wall siding and roof tiles were damaged and one roof truss was heavily damaged.					

===== August 28 event =====
List of confirmed tornadoes – 2024 August 28
JEF#	Location	Prefecture	Time (JST)	Path length	Max. width	Wind speeds
JEF2	Sadowara (Northern Miyazaki)	Miyazaki	13:53	7.9 km (4.9 mi)	390 m (430 yd)	60 m/s (130 mph)
JEF2	A strong tornado impacted northern parts of Miyazaki City, where it overturned vehicles, bent road signs, and damaged the roof of a factory.					
JEF1	Oriuzako to Aoshima (Southern Miyazaki)	Miyazaki	22:40	3.0 km (1.9 mi)	280 m (310 yd)	50 m/s (110 mph)
JEF1	?					

==== 2025 ====
In 2025, there were seven confirmed tornadoes in Japan.

2025 Tornado Strengths
JEFU	JEF0	JEF1	JEF2	JEF3	JEF4	JEF5
0	4	4	1	1	0	0

===== January 29 event =====
List of confirmed tornadoes – 2025 January 29
JEF#	Location	Prefecture	Time (JST)	Path length	Max. width	Wind speeds
JEF0	Sakai	Fukui	07:38			35 m/s (78 mph)
JEF0	A waterspout made landfall, knocking the roof tiles off of some buildings and collapsing a shed.					

===== July 14 event =====
List of confirmed tornadoes – 2025 July 14
JEF#	Location	Prefecture	Time (JST)	Path length	Max. width	Wind speeds
JEF1	Omaezaki	Shizuoka	18:23			40 m/s (89 mph)
JEF1	A tornado tore sheet metal roofs from residential buildings.					
JEF1	Shizuoka	Shizuoka	19:30			40 m/s (89 mph)
JEF1	This tornado rolled a light vehicle over in the Suruga ward.					
JEF0	Gifu	Gifu	21:40	1.3 km (0.81 mi)	100 m (110 yd)	35 m/s (78 mph)
JEF0	Roof tiles were torn off of residential building by this tornado.					

===== August 10 event =====
List of confirmed tornadoes – 2025 August 10
JEF#	Location	Prefecture	Time (JST)	Path length	Max. width	Wind speeds
JEF0	Kōra to Taga	Shiga	15:39			35 m/s (78 mph)
JEF0	This tornado damaged steel pipes in greenhouses and knocked roof tiles off a house.					

===== September 5 event =====
List of confirmed tornadoes – 2025 September 5
JEF#	Location	Prefecture	Time (JST)	Path length	Max. width	Wind speeds
JEF2	Kakegawa	Shizuoka	12:30			55 m/s (120 mph)
JEF2	Large vehicles were overturned and 22 roofs were damaged by this tornado.					
JEF3	Makinohara to Yoshida	Shizuoka	12:50			75 m/s (170 mph)
JEF3	1 death — This very powerful tornado damaged almost two thousand buildings, including one that was completely destroyed. Walls of steel-framed buildings were deformed. 83 people were injured, and one man was killed when the tornado overturned his car.					
JEF1	Kikugawa (1st tornado)	Shizuoka	12:50			45 m/s (100 mph)
JEF1	A signboard collapsed.					
JEF1	Kikugawa (2nd tornado)	Shizuoka	13:00			40 m/s (89 mph)
JEF1	Several coniferous trees were uprooted by this tornado.					
JEF2	Eastern Yaizu	Shizuoka	13:00			65 m/s (150 mph)
JEF2	The truss of a wooden house was damaged by this tornado.					
JEF1	Southern Hitachi	Ibaraki	13:39			50 m/s (110 mph)
JEF1	A tornado overturned two cars.					
JEF1	Itō	Shizuoka	14:10			50 m/s (110 mph)
JEF1	Roof materials were peeled off of wooden houses and steel-framed stores.					

===== September 18 event =====
List of confirmed tornadoes – 2025 September 18
JEF#	Location	Prefecture	Time (JST)	Path length	Max. width	Wind speeds
JEF1	Eastern Tsukuba	Ibaraki	14:53			45 m/s (100 mph)
JEF1	Roof tiles were ripped off and shipping containers were overturned. The storm that produced this tornado and several downbursts in the region was notably recorded on a nearby high-resolution weather radar.					

===== November 11 event =====
List of confirmed tornadoes – 2025 November 11
JEF#	Location	Prefecture	Time (JST)	Path length	Max. width	Wind speeds
JEF1	Ishigaki	Okinawa	08:00			40 m/s (89 mph)
JEF1	A tornado overturned a small kei car among other damages.					
JEF0	Taketomi	Okinawa	09:09			30 m/s (67 mph)
JEF0	Trees were snapped.					

==== 2026 ====
List of confirmed tornadoes – Tuesday, April 7, 2026 (Note: All dates are based on the local time zone where the tornado touched down; however, all times are in Coordinated Universal Time for consistency.)
EF#	Location	Region	Country	Start coord.	Time (UTC)	Path length	Max. width
JEF1	Isen	Kagoshima Prefecture	Japan	27.671670°N 128.928938°E	21:28	2 km (1.2 mi)	400 m (440 yd)
JEF1	A tornado peeled off the roofing of some homes and uprooted a tree.						
JEFU	Ishigaki	Okinawa Prefecture	Japan	24.331820°N 124.156902°E	12:40	6.1 km (3.8 mi)	Unknown
JEFU	A tornado was reported. No further information is available.						
JEF1	Sukagawa	Fukushima Prefecture	Japan		08:40		
JEF1	Preliminary information. Roofs of residential homes were damaged and tree trunks were snapped.						

== See also ==
- List of Asian tornadoes and tornado outbreaks
- Typhoons in Japan
- Climate of Japan
