= Rumbia =

Rumbia may refer to:

- Rumbia tree
- Rumbia LRT station in Singapore
- List of tropical storms named Rumbia
