= Typhoon Damrey (2012) =

Pacific typhoon in 2012

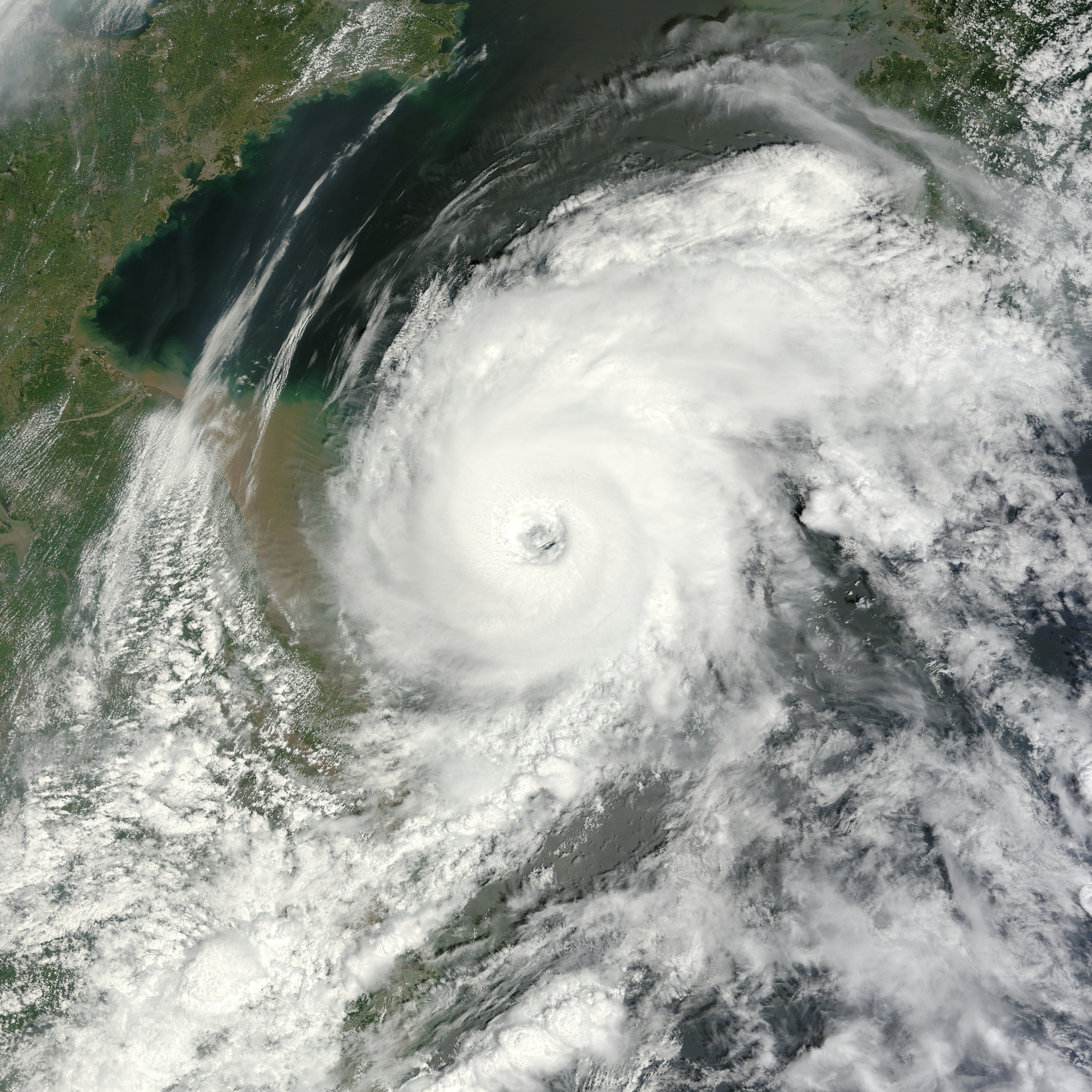
- Typhoon Damrey near peak intensity on August 2

Meteorological history
- Formed: July 27, 2012
- Dissipated: August 4, 2012

Typhoon
- 10-minute sustained (JMA)
- Highest winds: 130 km/h (80 mph)
- Lowest pressure: 965 hPa (mbar); 28.50 inHg

Category 1-equivalent typhoon
- 1-minute sustained (SSHWS/JTWC)
- Highest winds: 150 km/h (90 mph)
- Lowest pressure: 963 hPa (mbar); 28.44 inHg

Overall effects
- Fatalities: 48 total
- Damage: $4.55 billion
- Areas affected: Japan, South Korea, China
- IBTrACS
- Part of the 2012 Pacific typhoon season

Typhoon Damrey was a compact tropical cyclone, which became the strongest to affect the area north of the Yangtze River since 1949. It was the tenth named storm and the fifth typhoon of the 2012 Pacific typhoon season.

Damrey developed into a tropical storm north of the Tropic of Cancer on July 28 and drifted slowly. By late on July 30, Damrey began to accelerate west-northwestward. The storm struggled to make deep convection wrap around itself due to vertical wind shear and dry air since formation, until it passed near Kyushu on August 1. Damrey finally intensified into a typhoon early on August 2, a half of day before it made landfall over the northern Jiangsu.

== Meteorological history ==
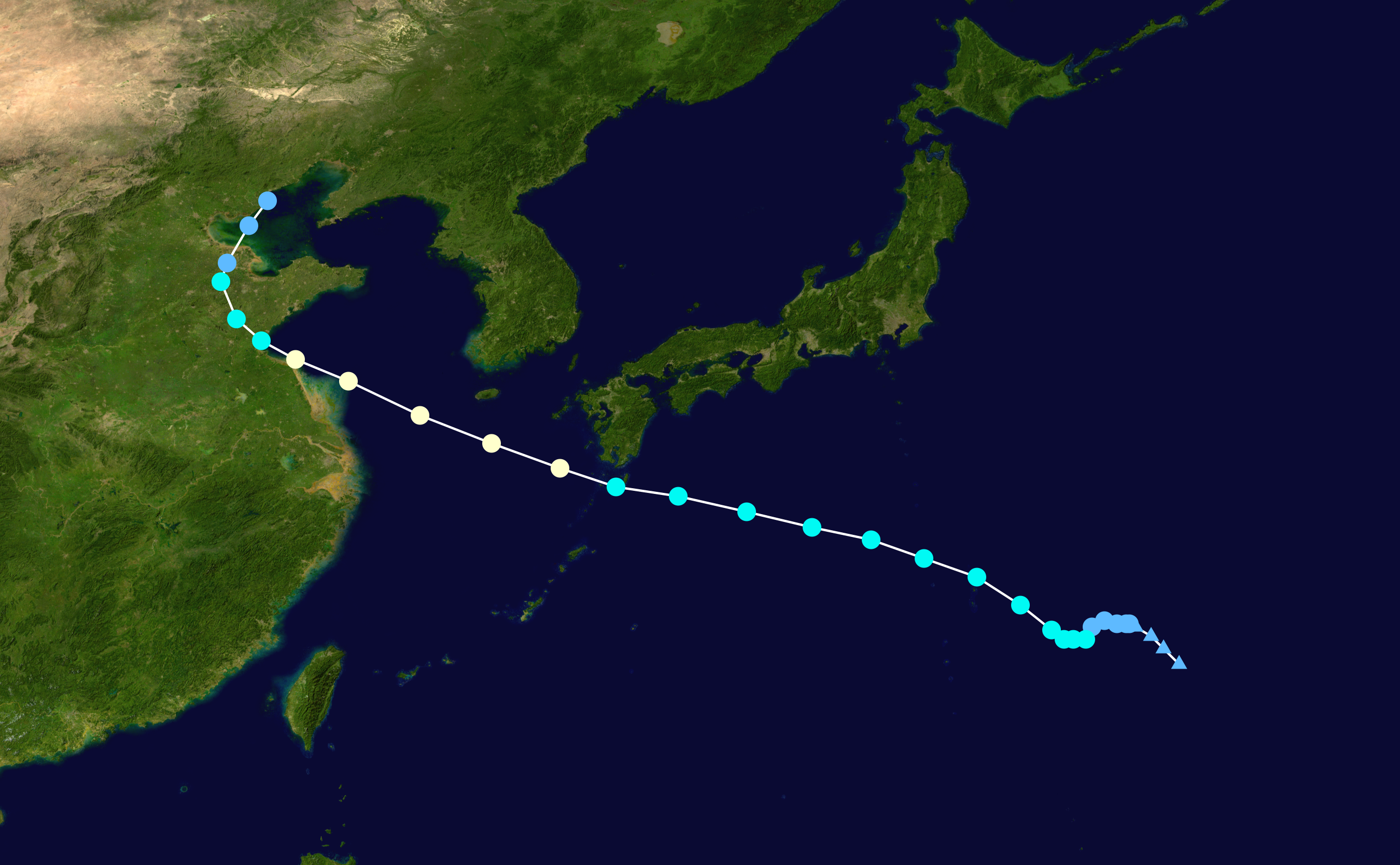
Map plotting the storm's track and intensity, according to the Saffir–Simpson scale Map key Saffir–Simpson scale Tropical depression (≤38 mph, ≤62 km/h) Tropical storm (39–73 mph, 63–118 km/h) Category 1 (74–95 mph, 119–153 km/h) Category 2 (96–110 mph, 154–177 km/h) Category 3 (111–129 mph, 178–208 km/h) Category 4 (130–156 mph, 209–251 km/h) Category 5 (≥157 mph, ≥252 km/h) Unknown Storm type Tropical cyclone Subtropical cyclone Extratropical cyclone, remnant low, tropical disturbance, or monsoon depression

Late on July 26, a tropical disturbance formed southwest of Minamitorishima, which was originally associated with the divergent north of a tropical upper tropospheric trough (TUTT). On July 27, as the original TUTT cell weakened, an upper-level anticyclone was building on the system. Although not being a fully warm-core system initially, it intensified into a tropical depression according to the Japan Meteorological Agency (JMA), when sea surface temperature ranged from 29 to 31 °C. However, the low-level circulation center (LLCC) became exposed later. On July 28, the Joint Typhoon Warning Center (JTWC) issued a Tropical Cyclone Formation Alert on the system, before JMA upgraded it to a tropical storm and named it Damrey. (Note: The name Damrey (Khmer: ដំរី, [ɗɑm.ˈrəj]) was contributed by Cambodia and means elephant in Khmer.) Late on the same day, JTWC upgraded Damrey to a tropical depression, with a partially exposed LLCC under moderate northwesterly vertical wind shear.

Damrey drifted southwestward slowly on July 29, as it was positioned south of a col region produced by an upper-level mid-latitude shortwave trough digging east of Japan. At noon, JTWC upgraded Damrey to a tropical storm based on consolidation within the LLCC, although overall convection has slightly decreased. A second TUTT cell located to the east approached and began to enhance eastward outflow, yet the south TUTT which provided convergence filled up. On July 30, Damrey began to track northwestward. The LLCC of Damrey became well-defined and fully exposed, as dry air surrounded the west semi-circle. By late on July 30, Damrey intensified into a severe tropical storm northeast of Chichi-jima and began to accelerated west-northwestward along the southern periphery of a deep-layered subtropical ridge to the north.

The storm started to rebuild central convection on July 31, yet troughing and dry air entrainment degraded outflow over the southern portion. On August 1, deep convection finally wrapped around the LLCC because of tracking over the warmest regions of the Kuroshio Current, as well as dry air began to weaken. When Damrey passed near Yakushima at 06Z, the system developed a central dense overcast. According to JTWC Best Track Data, Damrey became a typhoon at 12Z. Poleward outflow channel still remained, but increasing convergence from the outflow of Typhoon Saola produced subsidence on the southern semi-circle and limited convection.

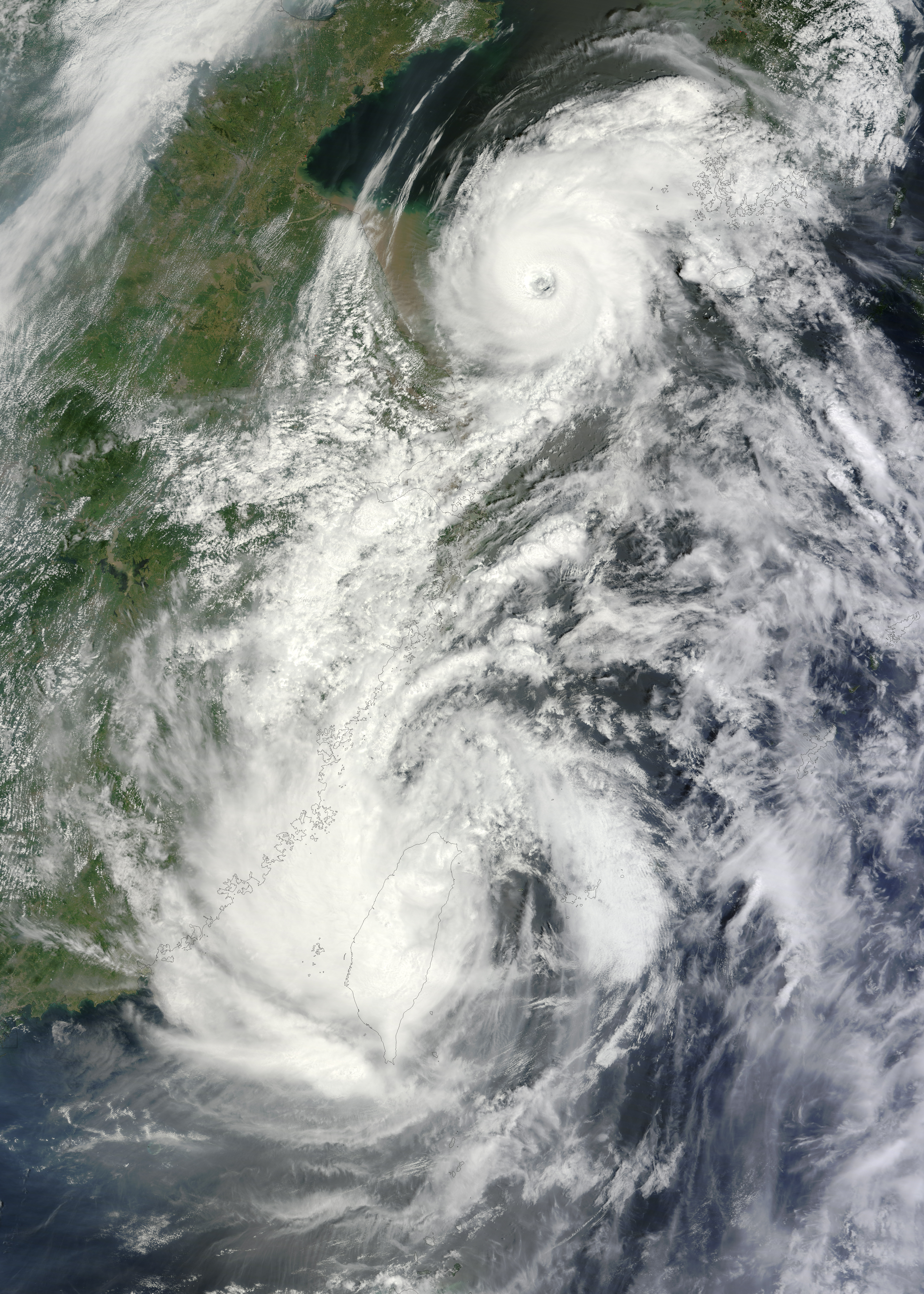
Both Damrey (upper) and Saola (lower) approaching and making landfall over China on August 2

Based on RSMC Best Track Data, Damrey intensified into a typhoon west of Jeju at 00Z on August 2, when it just arrived at the Yellow Sea. At the moment, the typhoon featured a 25 nautical miles (46 km; 29 mi) ragged eye with a symmetric eyewall, yet deepest convection was mostly confined to the northern semi-circle. As Saola weakened into a severe tropical storm and became quasi-stationary near Taiwan, its outflow has weakened due to an increase in distance between two systems. Unlike JTWC analyses that Damrey began to gradually weaken after 00Z on August 2, JMA analyses that the typhoon reached peak intensity at 06Z, with ten-minute maximum sustained winds at 70 knots (130 km/h, 80 mph) and the atmospheric pressure at 965 hPa (14.00 psi). Damrey was still tracking along the southern periphery of a deep-layered subtropical ridge anchored over Kyushu, Japan, when the system had a 20 nautical miles (37 km; 23 mi) ragged eye with a symmetric eyewall.

After slightly weakening, Damrey made landfall as a minimal typhoon over Xiangshui County in Jiangsu, China at 13:30 UTC (21:30 CST). Because of land interaction, the system weakened into a severe tropical storm near Lianyungang at 18Z, when JTWC also downgraded it to a tropical storm with a final warning. Early on August 3, Damrey weakened into a tropical storm north of Linyi in Shandong, and then it turned northward. A half of day later, the system weakened into a tropical depression northeast of Binzhou, before it turned northeastward and arrived at the Bohai Sea. The system dissipated near the coast of Qinhuangdao in Hebei on August 4.

== Preparations and impact ==
Prior to Typhoon Damrey's arrival in eastern China, officials issued a red alert, the highest level of warning in China's alert system, for Jiangsu Province and ordered the evacuation of 100,000 residents.

Striking Jiangsu Province on August 2, Damrey brought damaging wind gusts up to 126 km/h (78 mph) and heavy rains to the region. At least 21 counties across Jiangsu and neighboring Shandong Provinces were affected by the storm. Across Shandong Province, rainfall from the storm reached 174 mm (6.9 in). According to officials, two people were killed and twenty-nine others were injured in the hard-hit Rizhao area. Overall, at least 1,718 homes were destroyed and approximately 30,000 were damaged. Economic losses in the province were estimated at ¥1.69 billion (US$265.2 million).

Severe flooding in Liaoning Province triggered by the typhoon's heavy rains destroyed approximately 10,000 homes and damaged 17,000 more. Economic losses from the storm were estimated at ¥2.36 billion (US$371 million). In Benxi, severe flooding along the Sandaohe and Xihe Rivers trapped about 300 construction workers in a tunnel on August 6. Nine people were killed and four others were reported missing in the province. In neighboring Hebei Province, another 9,400 homes were destroyed and five person was killed and another was reported missing. Between the two provinces, at least 3.79 million people were affected by the storm. On August 4, the Chinese government launched a relief operation to aid victims of the flooding.

In all, 48 people were killed in China, and total economic losses amounted to be CNY29 billion (US$4.55 billion).

== See also ==
- Typhoon Fengshen (2002)
- Tropical Storm Ampil
- Typhoon Jongdari
- Typhoon Muifa (2022)
- Typhoon Bebinca (2024)
