= Tropical Storm Soulik (2024) =

Pacific tropical storm in 2024

Tropical Storm Soulik (Gener)
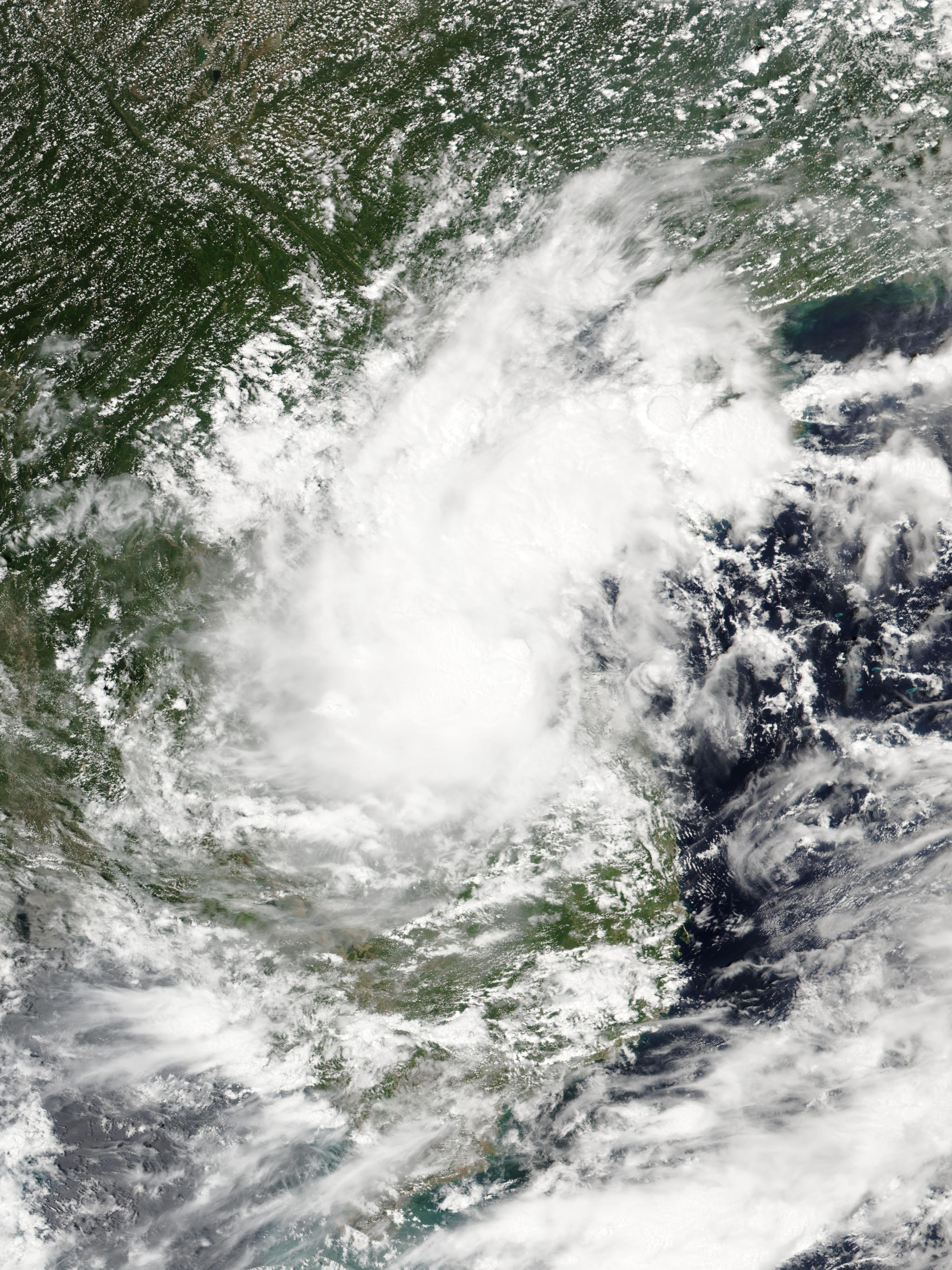
- Soulik at its peak intensity nearing landfall in Vietnam on September 19

Meteorological history
- Formed: September 15, 2024
- Dissipated: September 20, 2024

Tropical storm
- 10-minute sustained (JMA)
- Highest winds: 65 km/h (40 mph)
- Lowest pressure: 992 hPa (mbar); 29.29 inHg

Tropical storm
- 1-minute sustained (SSHWS/JTWC)
- Highest winds: 65 km/h (40 mph)
- Lowest pressure: 989 hPa (mbar); 29.21 inHg

Overall effects
- Fatalities: 29
- Injuries: 19
- Missing: 3
- Damage: $33.7 million (2024 USD)
- Areas affected: Philippines, Vietnam, Laos, Thailand, Myanmar
- Part of the 2024 Pacific typhoon season

Tropical Storm Soulik, (Note: The name Soulik (Pohnpeian: Soulik, [sʲoulik]) was contributed by the Federated States of Micronesia and refers to a traditional title of Pohnpeian chiefs in Pohnpeian.) known in the Philippines as Tropical Depression Gener, was a weak tropical cyclone that impacted both the Philippines and Vietnam. It formed as the fifteenth named storm of the annual typhoon season in mid-September 2024, Soulik originated from a low-pressure area to the east-northeast of Manila, Philippines on September 14, when the Philippine Atmospheric, Geophysical and Astronomical Services Administration (PAGASA) locally designated the tropical depression as Gener due to its formation within the Philippine Area of Responsibility on September 16.

The system gradually shifted westward along the southern edge of a mid-level subtropical high, making landfall in Palanan, Isabela, on September 17. As it traveled further into Luzon, it weakened while encountering the rugged terrain of the Cordillera Central. After emerging over the South China Sea on the next day, the system displayed a broad, disorganized low-level circulation. Although two disturbances in the South China Sea were initially expected to merge closer to Vietnam, the Joint Typhoon Warning Center considered merging these disturbances into one system. Early the next day, the depression strengthened into a tropical storm named Soulik by the Japan Meteorological Agency (JMA). Soulik made landfall near Quang Binh and Quảng Trị, Vietnam, at around 2 p.m. local time. It quickly weakened to a tropical depression due to land interaction, and the JMA continued to monitor the system until it dissipated on September 20.

The combined effects of Soulik, the southwest monsoon, and Typhoons Bebinca, Pulasan, and Igme have resulted in at least 26 fatalities, 18 injuries, and three missing persons in the Philippines, with total damages amounting to ₱1.11 billion (US$22.63 million); in Vietnam, heavy rains from Soulik have led to three deaths and damage at US$11.1 million, while in Thailand, officials in Nakhon Phanom have swiftly initiated water pumping operations into the Mekong River due to heavy rainfall, and the Meteorology and Hydrology Department has reported that the remnants of Soulik and associated wind waves are affecting the southeastern areas of Myanmar.

== Meteorological history ==
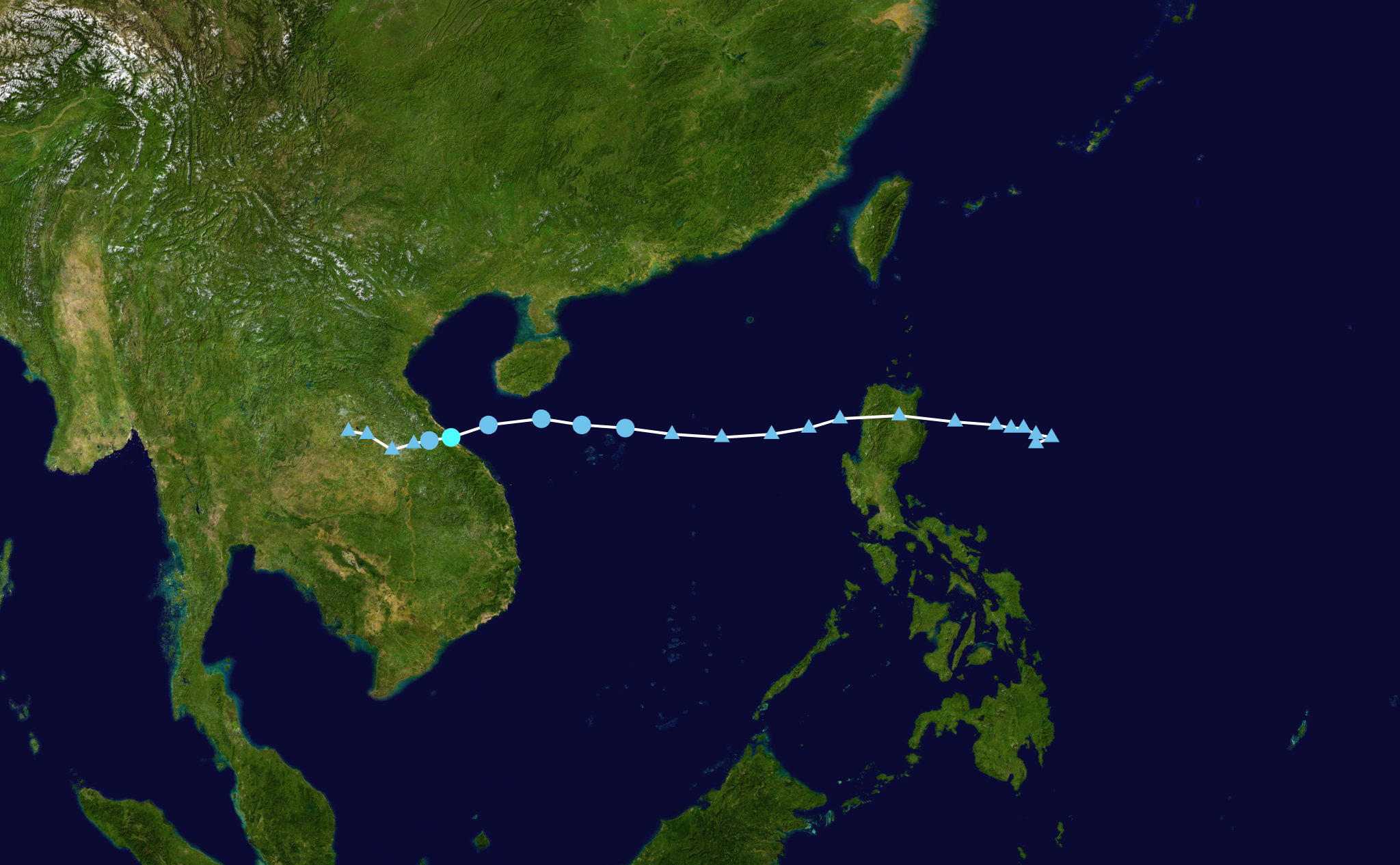
Map plotting the storm's track and intensity, according to the Saffir–Simpson scale Map key Saffir–Simpson scale Tropical depression (≤38 mph, ≤62 km/h) Tropical storm (39–73 mph, 63–118 km/h) Category 1 (74–95 mph, 119–153 km/h) Category 2 (96–110 mph, 154–177 km/h) Category 3 (111–129 mph, 178–208 km/h) Category 4 (130–156 mph, 209–251 km/h) Category 5 (≥157 mph, ≥252 km/h) Unknown Storm type Tropical cyclone Subtropical cyclone Extratropical cyclone, remnant low, tropical disturbance, or monsoon depression

The origins of Tropical Storm Soulik can be traced back to September 14, when the Japan Meteorological Agency (JMA) reported that a low-pressure area had formed approximately 596 km (371 mi) east-northeast of Manila, Philippines. At 00:00 UTC on September 15, the JMA identified the system as a tropical depression, featuring a defined, partially exposed low-level circulation and persistent deep convection over the southwest quadrant. At 13:00 UTC on September 16, the United States Joint Typhoon Warning Center (JTWC) issued a Tropical Cyclone Formation Alert (TCFA), indicating that upper-level conditions were marginal, with low to moderate vertical wind shear and weak outflow aloft. On that same day, the Philippine Atmospheric, Geophysical and Astronomical Services Administration (PAGASA) announced that the system had developed into a tropical depression and named Gener, as it formed within the Philippine Area of Responsibility. The system was gradually shifting westward along the southern edge of a mid-level subtropical high, and at 23:00 PHT (15:00 UTC) on September 16, the storm made landfall in Palanan, Isabela.

The tropical depression traveled further into Luzon and weakened as it encountered the rugged terrain of the Cordillera Central. As it emerged over the South China Sea at 14:00 PHT (06:00 UTC) on the next day, the system displayed a broad disorganized low-level circulation. The depresion had conditions that were conducive to tropical cyclogenesis, featuring warm sea surface temperatures of 29–30 °C (84–86 °F) and low vertical wind shear. On September 18, the JTWC canceled their TCFA due to an obscured low-level circulation with flaring convection, while the depression had drifted into an area of moderate vertical wind shear. Earlier, two disturbances in the South China Sea near 98W and 99W were expected to merge and strengthen at 98W, closer to Vietnam, and shortly after, the system was classified as tropical depression 16W, showing rapidly consolidating deep convection that has organized significantly over the past six hours. However, the JTWC was considering the merging of two disturbances in the South China Sea into one system. Early the following day, the depression intensified into a tropical storm named Soulik, according to the JMA, while heading towards the northern coast of Vietnam, though it was gradually weakening, with peak 10-minute sustained winds estimated at 65 km/h (40 mph) and a minimum barometric pressure of 992 hPa (29.29 inHg). Soulik made landfall in Vĩnh Linh District, Quảng Trị, Vietnam, at around 2 p.m. local time that day, after which the JTWC discontinued warnings for the system. Soulik quickly weakened to a tropical depression due to land interaction, and the JMA continued to monitor the system until it dissipated on September 20.

== Preparations and impact ==
=== Philippines ===
After the system was classified as a tropical depression, the Philippine Atmospheric, Geophysical and Astronomical Services Administration (PAGASA) issued Tropical Cyclone Wind Signals for several areas, including the eastern and central parts of Mainland Cagayan, Isabela, Quirino, the eastern portion of Nueva Vizcaya, Kalinga, the eastern and central areas of Mountain Province, Ifugao, Aurora, the eastern part of Nueva Ecija, and the northern section of Mainland Quezon, including the Polillo Islands. Following the storm's landfall in Palanan, Isabela on September 17, PAGASA extended the warnings to Ilocos Norte, Ilocos Sur, La Union, Pangasinan, Zambales, Tarlac, Nueva Ecija, Pampanga, the northern and central parts of Bulacan, the northern sections of Bataan, and the northern portion of Metro Manila. By September 18, most TCWS signals were lowered by the PAGASA as the storm left the Philippine Area of Responsibility. Telecommunications company Globe Telecom prepared emergency supplies and personnel in areas where the storm was expected to hit. The National Disaster Risk Reduction and Management Council (NDRRMC) reported that classes were suspended in 625 areas, including 140 municipalities where work operations were also halted. Additionally, a state of calamity was declared in 28 areas. Soulik strengthened the southwest monsoon, which caused flooding that affected at least 9,000 people in Palawan.

Soulik, along with the southwest monsoon and Typhoons Bebinca, Pulasan, and Igme, has resulted in at least 26 fatalities, 18 injuries and three missing persons in the Philippines, affecting 1,629,519 people, displacing 15,875, and leading to 2,060 preemptive evacuations; the storms caused power outages in 48 cities and municipalities, blocked 121 roads, rendered 15 bridges impassable, and destroyed 3,649 homes, with 469 completely demolished, while agricultural damage reached ₱1.09 billion (US$22.17 million) and infrastructure damage was estimated at ₱22.69 million (US$460,659.9), bringing the total damage to ₱1.11 billion (US$22.63 million), according to the NDRRMC.

=== Elsewhere ===
Soulik making landfall in Vietnam on September 19.

The arrival of Tropical Storm Soulik has led to evacuations in central Vietnam, just days after Typhoon Yagi. Quảng Bình province has moved nearly 900 households—over 3,000 people—from high-risk areas to safer locations in anticipation of the storm. In Vinh Linh District, power outages occurred due to damage to the electricity grid. Forty-four road sections in Quang Bình are impassable due to landslides. As a result of Soulik's impact, the Civil Aviation Authority of Vietnam has temporarily suspended all flight operations at Dong Hoi Airport. In Quảng Bình, flooding affected 37 villages and over 600 households, with Minh Hóa district impacting 538 households. Prime Minister Phạm Minh Chính has instructed the People’s Committees in central provinces and cities to promptly implement their plans for responding to Tropical Storm Soulik. Damage from Soulik in Vietnam was estimated at 270.210 billion dong (US$11.1 million, 2024 USD).

The heavy rain and flooding in central Vietnam from Soulik have resulted in three deaths in Nghệ An and one injuries in Thua Thien Hue. In Thailand, heavy rainfall caused by Soulik has led officials in Nakhon Phanom to quickly start water pumping operations into the Mekong River, and Ao Phang Nga National Park will also be closed due to the weather conditions. The Meteorology and Hydrology Department reported that the remnants of Soulik and wind waves were crossing the southeastern areas of Myanmar.

== See also ==
- Weather of 2024
- Tropical cyclones in 2024
- Tropical Depression 18W (2013)
- Tropical Storm Sonca (2017)
- Tropical Storm Noul (2020)
