= List of storms named Rumbia =

The name Rumbia (Malay: rumbia, [rumbiə]) has been used to name four tropical cyclones in the northwestern Pacific Ocean. The name was contributed by Malaysia and means sago palm (Metroxylon sagu) in Malay.

- Tropical Storm Rumbia (2000) (T0022, 33W, Toyang) – impacted the Philippines.
- Tropical Storm Rumbia (2006) (T0617, 20W) – a tropical storm in the Pacific that churned away from land.
- Severe Tropical Storm Rumbia (2013) (T1306, 06W, Gorio) – struck the Philippines, China, Hong Kong, and Macau.
- Tropical Storm Rumbia (2018) (T1818, 21W) – a weak yet damaging storm that caused serious flooding in East China.

The name Rumbia was retired after the 2018 Pacific typhoon season and was replaced with Pulasan (Malay: pulasan, [pulasan]), which means pulasan (Nephelium ramboutan-ake) in Malay.

- Tropical Storm Pulasan (2024) (T2414, 15W, Helen) – affected East China, South Korea, and Japan.
