= Tropical Storm Noul (2020) =

Pacific tropical storm in 2020

Tropical Storm Noul (Leon)
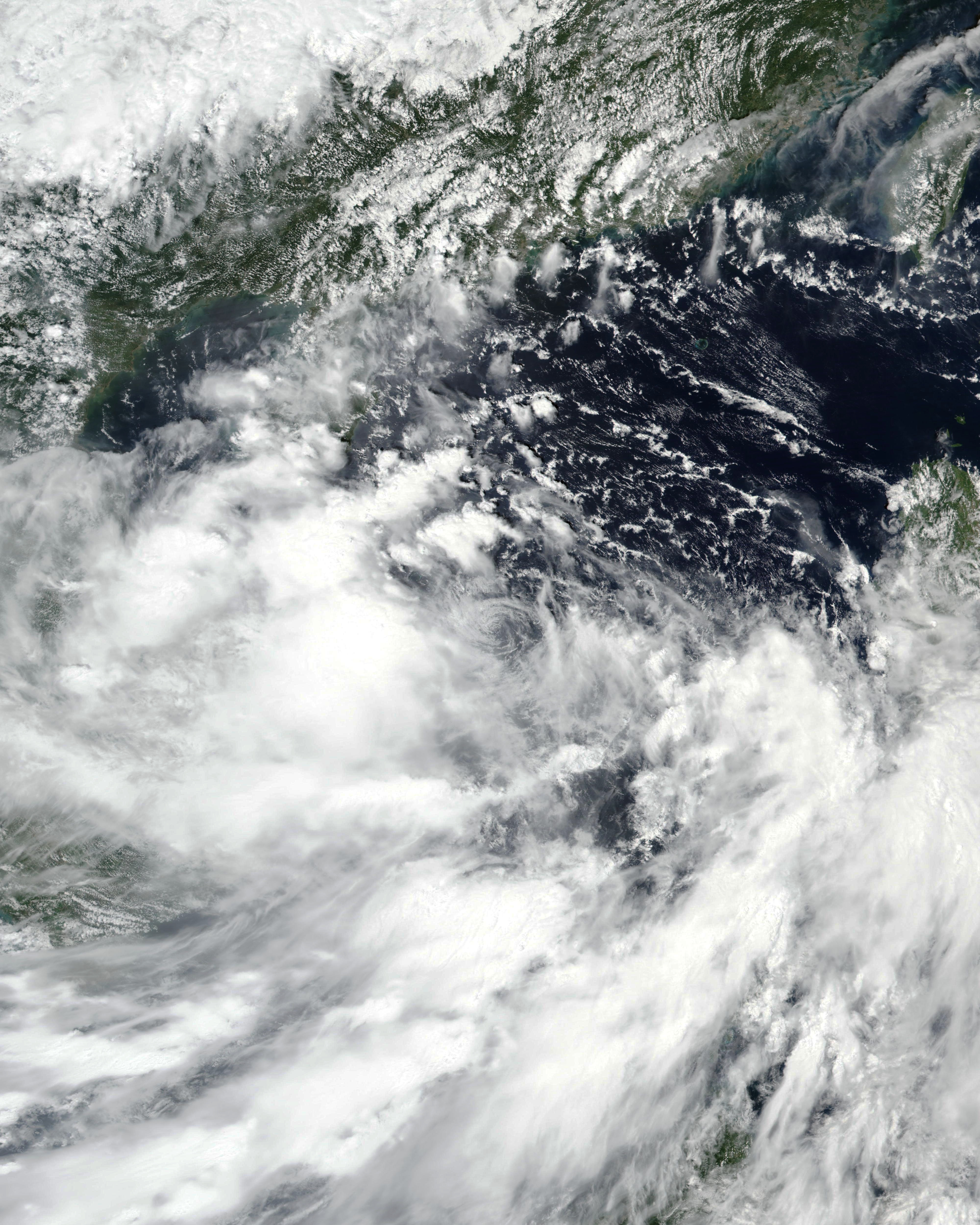
- Tropical Storm Noul approaching Vietnam on September 17

Meteorological history
- Formed: September 15, 2020
- Dissipated: September 18, 2020

Tropical storm
- 10-minute sustained (JMA)
- Highest winds: 85 km/h (50 mph)
- Lowest pressure: 992 hPa (mbar); 29.29 inHg

Tropical storm
- 1-minute sustained (SSHWS/JTWC)
- Highest winds: 95 km/h (60 mph)
- Lowest pressure: 990 hPa (mbar); 29.23 inHg

Overall effects
- Fatalities: 18 total
- Damage: $175.2 million
- Areas affected: Laos, Thailand, Myanmar, Philippines, Vietnam, Cambodia
- IBTrACS
- Part of the 2020 Pacific typhoon season

Tropical Storm Noul, also known in the Philippines as Tropical Storm Leon, was a weak, but deadly tropical cyclone that impacted central Vietnam, which had been affected by Tropical Storm Sinlaku more than one month earlier. Noul originated from a tropical system in the Philippine Sea in September 15. The system was upgraded into a tropical depression later that same day by JMA, with JTWC and PAGASA following suit in 15:00 UTC, with PAGASA assigning the local name Leon to the developing tropical cyclone. As Leon was leaving the area of responsibility, Leon intensified into a tropical storm and was assigned the international name Noul by JMA. Noul would make landfall between Quảng Trị and Thừa Thiên-Huế provinces in September 18 before degenerating into a remnant low over Thailand later that day.

Noul caused six deaths and losses of US$175.2 million in Vietnam. In Cambodia, Noul killed 12 people, in which 8 of them are killed by lightning strike on Battambang Province, 3 of them drowned in Preah Sihanouk and Koh Kong provinces, and a person from Pailin Province is missing and presumed dead.

== Meteorological history ==
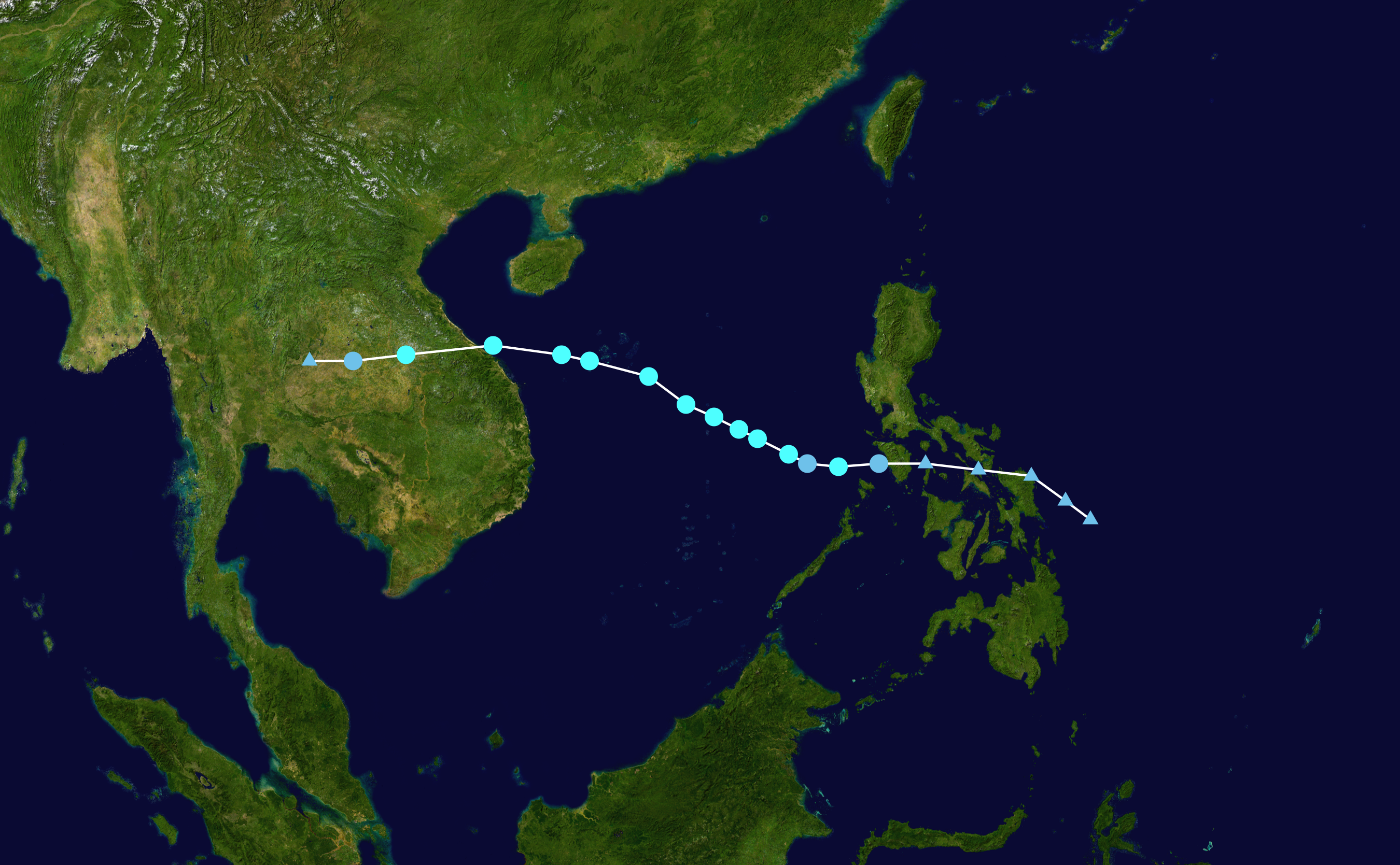
Map plotting the storm's track and intensity, according to the Saffir–Simpson scale Map key Saffir–Simpson scale Tropical depression (≤38 mph, ≤62 km/h) Tropical storm (39–73 mph, 63–118 km/h) Category 1 (74–95 mph, 119–153 km/h) Category 2 (96–110 mph, 154–177 km/h) Category 3 (111–129 mph, 178–208 km/h) Category 4 (130–156 mph, 209–251 km/h) Category 5 (≥157 mph, ≥252 km/h) Unknown Storm type Tropical cyclone Subtropical cyclone Extratropical cyclone, remnant low, tropical disturbance, or monsoon depression

On September 14 at 12:00 UTC, the Japan Meteorological Agency (JMA) began issuing warnings on a tropical depression as it was moving west-northwest. The system continued organizing, and on September 15 at 02:00 UTC, the Joint Typhoon Warning Center (JTWC) issued a Tropical Cyclone Formation Alert on the system as it was located over the Philippines. The system was in a favorable environment, though strengthening was limited due to the disorganized structure. Convection, albeit disorganized, began covering the low-level circulation, and at 15:00 UTC, the JTWC upgraded the system to a tropical depression, giving it the unofficial designation of 13W as it was located approximately 159 nautical miles (294 km; 183 mi) southwest of Manila. Sea surface temperatures in the area ranged from 30–32 °C (86–90 °F). At the same time, the PAGASA began issuing severe weather bulletins on the depression, giving it the local name Leon. 3 hours later at 18:00 UTC, the JMA upgraded the depression to a tropical storm, assigning it the name Noul. (Note: The name Noul (Korean: 노을, [no̞ɯɭ]) was contributed by North Korea and refers to the glow of sunrise or sunset in Korean.) At 21:00 on September 16, the storm left the PAR and PAGASA issued its final warning on the system. At 03:00 UTC September 18, Noul made landfall between Quảng Trị and Thừa Thiên-Huế provinces. At 9:00 UTC, the JTWC issued its final warning on the system. After being downgraded to a low pressure area (LPA), Noul followed a westward path and emerged in the Indian Ocean.

== Preparation and impacts ==
A few days before the storm hit Vietnam, the Vietnamese government closed three airports and evacuated more than one million people in the affected areas. Noul damaged homes and knocked down trees and power lines in Hue, Vietnam. Heavy precipitation amounts peaking at 310 mm (12.20 inches) fell in Da Nang. The storm caused 6 deaths and 705 billion đồng (US$30.4 million) in damage.

== See also ==
- Weather of 2020
- Tropical cyclones in 2020
- Tropical Storm Dianmu (2021)
- Tropical Storm Sinlaku (2020) – affected the same countries earlier in the season.
- Tropical Storm Soulik (2024)
