= Tropical Storm Pulasan =

Pacific tropical storm in 2024

Tropical Storm Pulasan (Helen)
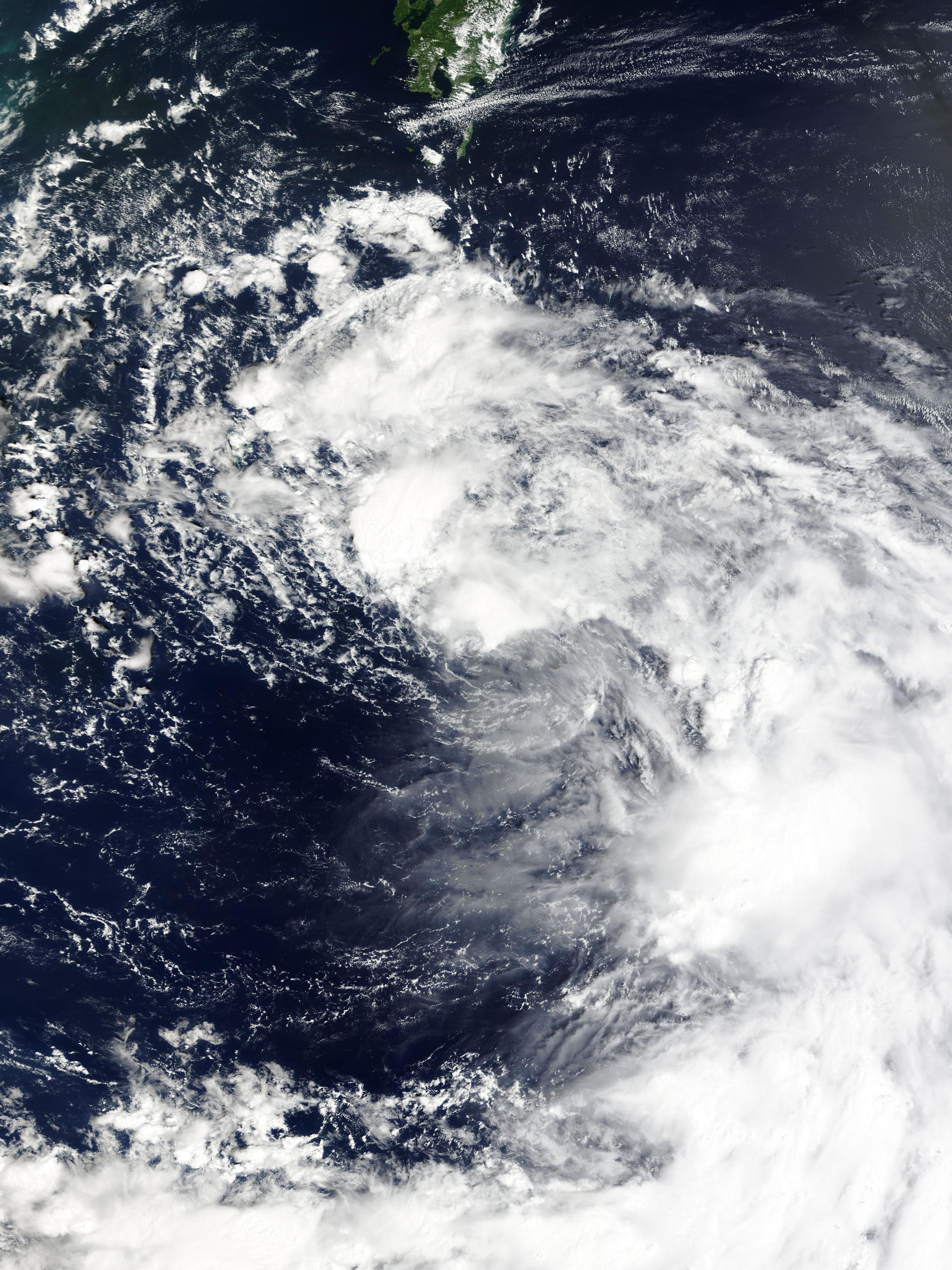
- Pulasan approaching eastern China on September 18

Meteorological history
- Formed: September 15, 2024
- Extratropical: September 21, 2024
- Dissipated: September 27, 2024

Tropical storm
- 10-minute sustained (JMA)
- Highest winds: 85 km/h (50 mph)
- Lowest pressure: 992 hPa (mbar); 29.29 inHg

Tropical storm
- 1-minute sustained (SSHWS/JTWC)
- Highest winds: 110 km/h (70 mph)
- Lowest pressure: 981 hPa (mbar); 28.97 inHg

Overall effects
- Fatalities: 17
- Injuries: 50
- Missing: 12
- Damage: $4.15 million (2024 USD)
- Areas affected: Mariana Islands Philippines, Eastern China, South Korea, Japan (especially Ishikawa Prefecture), British Columbia
- Part of the 2024 Pacific typhoon season

Tropical Storm Pulasan, (Note: The name Pulasan (Malay: pulasan, [pulasan]) was contributed by Malaysia and means pulasan (Nephelium ramboutan-ake) in Malay.) known in the Philippines as Tropical Storm Helen, was a tropical cyclone that impacted the Mariana Islands, East China, Japan, South Korea and the Philippines in mid-September 2024. Pulasan developed over the Philippine Sea as a tropical depression on September 15 and strengthened into the fourteenth named storm of the annual typhoon season the following day.

After gaining organization, the system rapidly developed and reached its peak intensity with winds of 85 km/h (50 mph) and a central pressure of 992 hPa (29.29 inHg). Pulasan then turned northwestward, eventually moving across Okinawa Island and making landfall in Zhoushan, Zhejiang, followed by a second landfall in Shanghai, just days after Typhoon Bebinca affected the Shanghai area on September 19. Pulasan reemerged over the East China Sea, just off the coast of China. By September 21, Pulasan had transitioned into an extratropical low as it moved east-northeastward and became embedded within the polar front jet to the north, passing over southern South Korea. The extratropical storm entered the Sea of Japan on September 22, crossed the Tōhoku region, and then emerged into the Pacific Ocean while being absorbed by another extratropical cyclone.

The extratropical remnants of Pulasan were last noted by the Japan Meteorological Agency on September 24 near the International Dateline; however, the Ocean Prediction Center indicated that these remnants crossed the International Dateline and entered the Central North Pacific Ocean late on September 25. Afterward, the remnants gradually approached the coast of British Columbia, making landfall on September 27 and dissipating after moving inland the same day.

As a monsoon depression, Pulasan produced winds and swells across the Mariana Islands. In China, more than 300 mm (12 in) of rainfall was recorded in Fengxian and Pudong Districts within a six-hour period, breaking historical records for each district since meteorological observations began. Xinhua reported that the city evacuated 112,000 people and suspended some ferry and train services. Heavy rains caused by Pulasan triggered widespread landslides and flooding in the Noto Peninsula, causing extensive damage that exacerbated the effects of the 2024 Noto earthquake, which devastated the region in January. In South Korea, the cities of Changwon, Yeosu and Busan recorded 519.2 mm (20.44 in), 399.5 mm (15.73 in) and 390.2 mm (15.36 in) of rainfall, respectively, on September 21. The remnants of Pulasan caused 15,000 customers to lose power, primarily on Vancouver Island, especially in Campbell River and Courtenay. In total, the tropical storm caused at least 17 deaths, 50 injuries, and left 12 people missing.

== Meteorological history ==
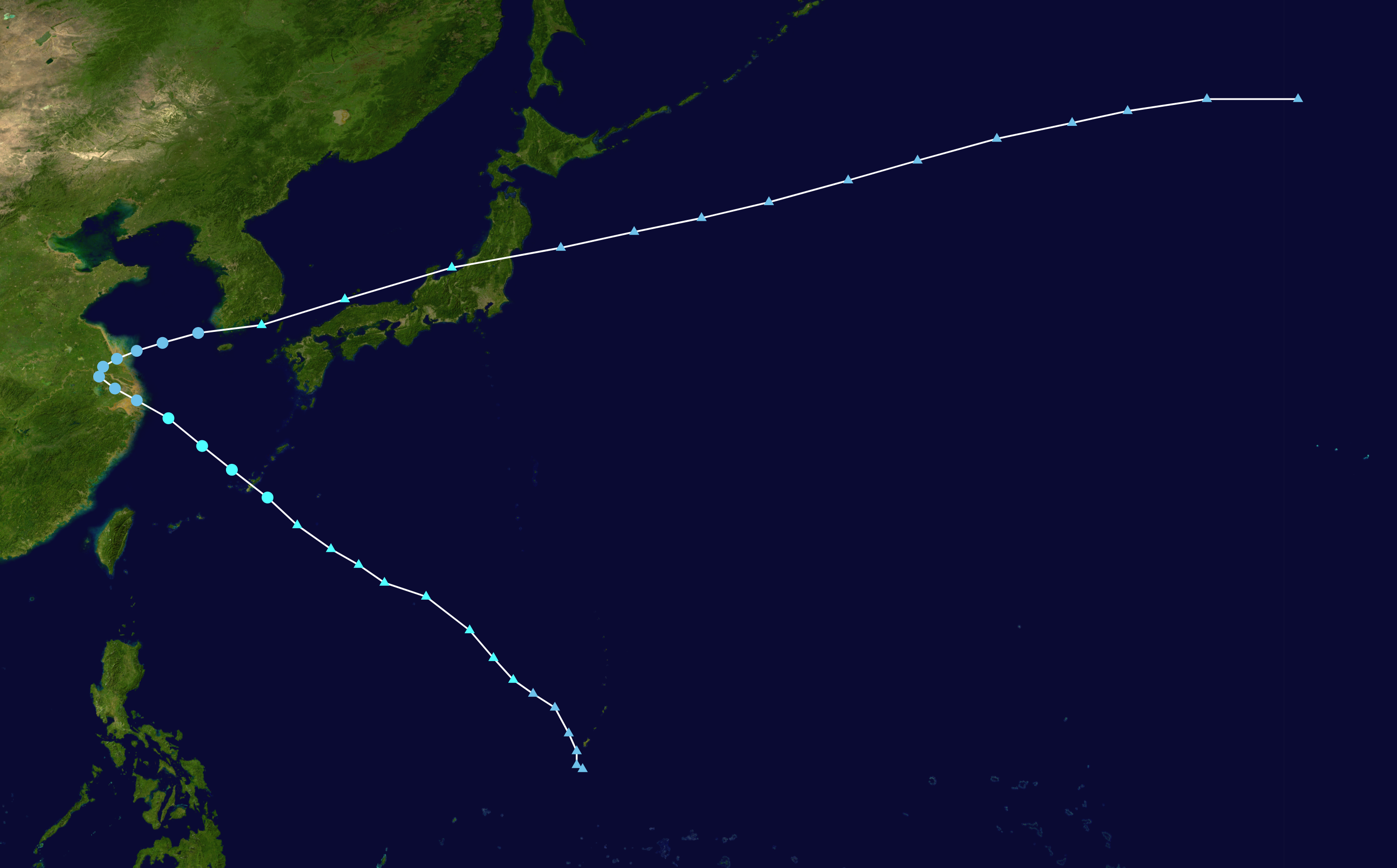
Map plotting the storm's track and intensity, according to the Saffir–Simpson scale Map key Saffir–Simpson scale Tropical depression (≤38 mph, ≤62 km/h) Tropical storm (39–73 mph, 63–118 km/h) Category 1 (74–95 mph, 119–153 km/h) Category 2 (96–110 mph, 154–177 km/h) Category 3 (111–129 mph, 178–208 km/h) Category 4 (130–156 mph, 209–251 km/h) Category 5 (≥157 mph, ≥252 km/h) Unknown Storm type Tropical cyclone Subtropical cyclone Extratropical cyclone, remnant low, tropical disturbance, or monsoon depression

Tropical Storm Pulasan emerged from an area of atmospheric convection 196 km (122 mi) west-southwest of Andersen Air Force Base, Guam on September 14. Satellite imagery indicated a broad, elongated area of circulation obscured by flaring and disorganized deep convection, with the disturbance situated in a favorable environment for development. At 00:00 UTC on September 15, the Japan Meteorological Agency (JMA) designated the system as a tropical depression. The United States Joint Typhoon Warning Center (JTWC) issued a tropical cyclone formation alert, noting that the system was disorganized, deep, fragmented, and had flaring convection obscuring the low-level circulation. Shortly after, the depression intensified into a tropical storm and was named Pulasan by the JMA. Pulasan was characterized by a large cyclonic circulation exceeding 1,111 kilometres (690 mi) and extensive gale-force winds, leading the JTWC to classify it as a monsoon depression at 06:00 UTC on September 16, before later upgrading it to a tropical storm and designating it as 15W.

Pulasan progressed north-northeastward along the northwestern edge of a mid-level subtropical high, with a band of enhanced winds encircling the eastern edge, accompanied by deep convection, while the center stayed clear and was supplied with dry air from a tropical upper tropospheric trough cell to the west. By 11:00 PHT (03:00 UTC) on September 17, Pulasan had entered the Philippine Area of Responsibility (PAR) and was subsequently named Helen by the Philippine Atmospheric, Geophysical and Astronomical Services Administration (PAGASA). The JMA reported that Pulasan reached its peak intensity at 00:00 UTC, with 10-minute sustained winds of 85 km/h (50 mph) and a central pressure of 992 hPa (29.29 inHg). By 12:00 UTC, the JTWC reported that the storm had peaked with 1-minute sustained winds of 110 km/h (70 mph). Pulasan's low-level circulation has remained broad and somewhat exposed, as dry air continues to encircle its southern side while the system moves northwestward along the southwestern edge of a mid-level subtropical high. Pulasan exited the PAR on September 18 while traversing Okinawa Island in Japan's Ryukyu Archipelago as its circulation center strengthened with persistent convection, and satellite imagery displayed flaring convection along with weak easterly outflow over the East China Sea. On September 19, Pulasan made landfall in Zhoushan, Zhejiang, followed by a second landfall in Shanghai, just days after Typhoon Bebinca affected the Shanghai area. As the storm moved overland, it maintained a well-defined circulation center; however, the system gradually turned northeastward under the influence of mid-latitude prevailing westerlies.

Pulasan reemerged over the East China Sea, just off the coast of Jiangsu, China, showcasing a large, near-symmetric area of deep convection to the southeast on September 20. Meanwhile, satellite imagery and surface reports from Jeju Island indicated that it was in the earliest phase of extratropical transition, with vigorous deep convection occurring over the southern semicircle. By 06:00 UTC on September 21, the JMA reported that Pulasan had transitioned into an extratropical low as it moved east-northeastward and became embedded within the polar front jet to the north, passing over southern South Korea. The JTWC then ceased issuing advisories on the system as it underwent frontogenesis while entering the baroclinic zone. The extratropical storm entered the Sea of Japan on September 22, crossed the Tōhoku region, and then emerged into the Pacific Ocean while being absorbed by another extratropical cyclone. The extratropical remnants of Pulasan were last noted by the JMA on September 24 near the International Dateline; however, the Ocean Prediction Center indicated that these remnants crossed the International Dateline and entered the Central North Pacific Ocean late on September 25. The remnants gradually approached the coast of British Columbia, making landfall on September 27, moving inland, and dissipating the same day.

== Preparations and impact ==
=== Micronesia and Mariana Islands ===
As a monsoon depression, Pulasan produced westerly swells that affected Western Micronesia and the Mariana Islands. In Saipan, a wind gust of 56 km/h (35 mph) was recorded, higher than that of Typhoon Bebinca a week earlier. Maximum sustained winds of 54 km/h (33 mph) were observed at Saipan International Airport, with a max gust of 89 km/h (55 mph). A private weather station on Wireless Ridge reported winds of 85 km/h (53 mph) and a max gust of 98 km/h (61 mph). Regardless, no damage was reported on the island. Flash flooding occurred in Guam when a monsoon surge produced a 24-hour total of 143 mm (5.62 in). Sections of Route 1 in Tamuning and Route 4 in Talofofo were inundated and impassable, though other roads that were also flooded remained passable. Sustained winds of 65 km/h (40 mph) were observed, and a wind gust of 94 km/h (59 mph) was recorded at Andersen Air Force Base. Flights to and from the island were canceled or delayed. On September 17, three swimmers were swept away by large waves off of Gun Beach, before being rescued.

=== Asia ===
The Yangjiazhai meteorological station in Fengxian District and the Nicheng Park meteorological station in Pudong District both recorded more than 300 mm (12 in) of rainfall within a six-hour period, breaking historical records for each district since meteorological observations began. Due to Pulasan, winds of 83 km/h (52 mph) were recorded in Fengxian, Shanghai, where several roads and neighborhoods were flooded. Xinhua reported that the city evacuated 112,000 people and suspended 26 ferry and 54 train services. Total damage in China was estimated at 30 million yuan (US$4.15 million). PAGASA reported that the southwest monsoon, enhanced by Soulik and Pulasan, will bring strong to gale-force winds across the Philippines.

Tropical Storm Pulasan regenerating over the East China Sea on September 21

As Pulasan approached Japan, 44,700 residents from Wajima, Suzu, and Noto in Ishikawa Prefecture were given evacuation orders, along with 16,000 others in Yamagata and Niigata Prefectures. The Japan Meteorological Agency issued the highest level of alert for heavy rain across several cities in Ishikawa. Heavy rains caused by Pulasan triggered widespread landslides and flooding in the Noto Peninsula, causing extensive damage which exacerbated the effects of the 2024 Noto earthquake which devastated the region in January. The floods killed 16 people, injured 47, destroyed 673 houses and damaged 1,284 others. In Wajima, 120 mm (4.7 in) of rainfall was recorded within an hour. Up to ten people were left missing in the town, including four due to a landslide at a construction site. In Suzu, one person drowned and another was missing. In Noto, one person was missing and two others were critically injured after a landslide struck their home. At least twelve rivers across Ishikawa overflowed, and 6,500 households were left without power in the prefecture, according to the Hokuriku Electric Power Company.

At least 903 people from 581 households were evacuated across six provinces in South Korea. The cities of Changwon, Yeosu and Busan recorded 519.2 mm (20.44 in), 399.5 mm (15.73 in) and 390.2 mm (15.36 in) of rainfall respectively on September 21. Flooding affected 83 sections of public roads—leading to 18 incidents of soil loss and a wall collapse—30 private facilities and 27 houses. Two trucks fell into a sinkhole in Busan. In Yangju city, Gyeonggi province, an elderly man died after being swept away by a torrent. A total of 27 private homes were flooded, affecting almost 30 private businesses, including shops and factories. Moreover, 641 areas within 22 national parks throughout the country were still unreachable.

=== British Columbia ===
The remnants of Tropical Storm Pulasan have caused wind warnings for several areas in British Columbia, including the B.C. Coast, sections of Vancouver Island, the Central Coast, and Haida Gwaii, while approximately 15,000 customers lost power, primarily on Vancouver Island, especially in Campbell River and Courtenay.

== See also ==
- Weather of 2024
- Tropical cyclones in 2024
- Tropical Storm Fung-wong (2014)
- Tropical Storm Ampil (2018)
- Typhoon Bebinca (2024)
- Typhoon Kong-rey (2024) - Had a similar track 1 month after Pulasan
