= Tropical Storm Rumbia (2000) =

Pacific tropical storm in 2000

Tropical Storm Rumbia (Toyang)
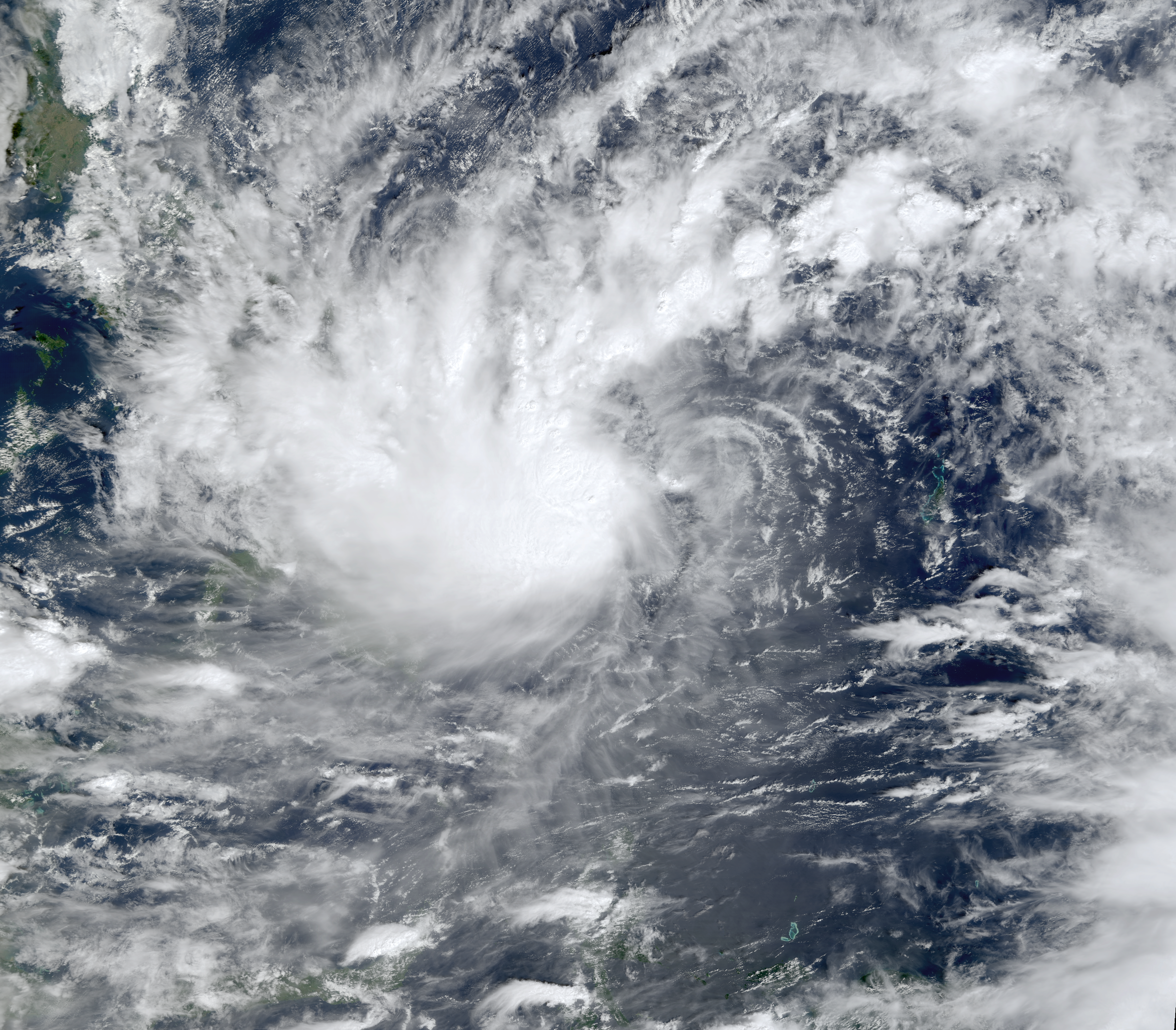
- Tropical Storm Rumbia near peak intensity on November 29

Meteorological history
- Formed: November 25, 2000
- Dissipated: December 7, 2000

Tropical storm
- 10-minute sustained (JMA)
- Highest winds: 75 km/h (45 mph)
- Lowest pressure: 990 hPa (mbar); 29.23 inHg

Tropical storm
- 1-minute sustained (SSHWS/JTWC)
- Highest winds: 100 km/h (65 mph)

Overall effects
- Fatalities: 48
- Damage: $1 million (2000 USD)
- Areas affected: Philippines; Vietnam
- IBTrACS
- Part of the 2000 Pacific typhoon season

Tropical Storm Rumbia, (Note: The name Rumbia (Malay: rumbia, [rumbiə]) was contributed by Malaysia and means sago palm (Metroxylon sagu) in Malay.) known in the Philippines as Tropical Storm Toyang, brought deadly flooding to the central and southern Philippines in late November and early December 2000. The last of three consecutive tropical cyclones of at least tropical storm intensity to strike the Philippines, Rumbia began as a tropical depression on November 27, gradually intensifying to reach tropical storm intensity the next day. Strengthening later stagnated, and Rumbia would weaken back to depression status as it made landfall on the central Philippines on December 1. Though the Japan Meteorological Agency (JMA) determined Rumbia to have dissipated on December 2, the Joint Typhoon Warning Center (JTWC) continued to monitor the system over the next few days as it tracked across the South China Sea. For a period of time beginning on December 5, Rumbia reorganized and strengthened back to tropical storm intensity before wind shear began to weaken the system. Located south of Vietnam on December 7, the storm's circulation center became devoid of convection, and by then Rumbia was declared by the JTWC to have dissipated.

In the Philippines, Rumbia caused roughly US$1 million in damage and 48 fatalities. (Note: All monetary values are in their respective currency's worth in 2000.) Several transportation routes were suspended in the lead-up to the storm's landfall. As a result of the tropical storm, power outages occurred, especially in Surigao. Several towns and villages were flooded, displacing around 70,000 people and putting 4,100 people into temporary emergency sheltering.

== Meteorological history ==
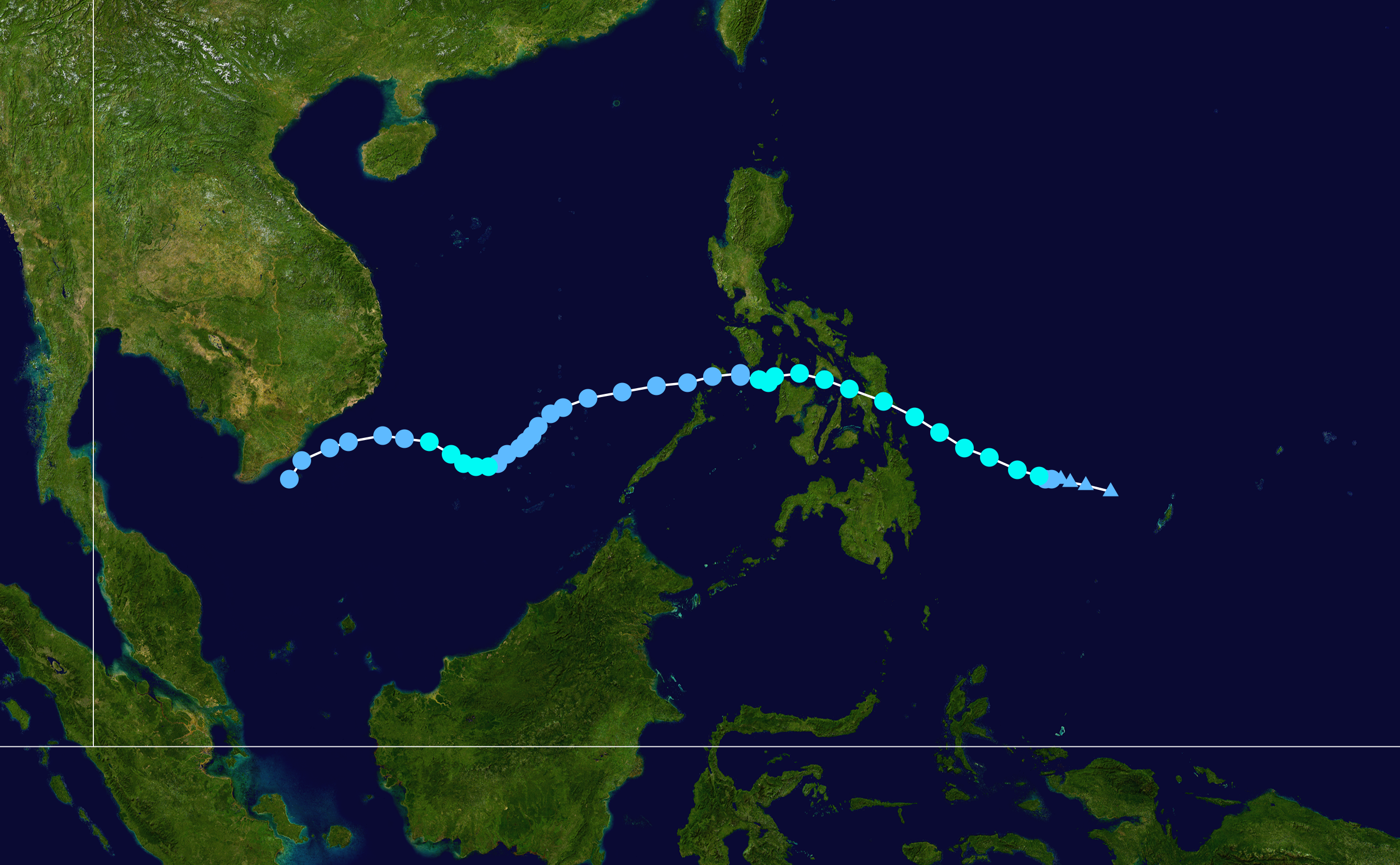
Map plotting the storm's track and intensity, according to the Saffir–Simpson scale Map key Saffir–Simpson scale Tropical depression (≤38 mph, ≤62 km/h) Tropical storm (39–73 mph, 63–118 km/h) Category 1 (74–95 mph, 119–153 km/h) Category 2 (96–110 mph, 154–177 km/h) Category 3 (111–129 mph, 178–208 km/h) Category 4 (130–156 mph, 209–251 km/h) Category 5 (≥157 mph, ≥252 km/h) Unknown Storm type Tropical cyclone Subtropical cyclone Extratropical cyclone, remnant low, tropical disturbance, or monsoon depression

The predecessor to Rumbia developed as an area of convection on November 25, southeast of Palau. The region of disturbed weather was connected with a weak low-pressure area. Embedded within the monsoon trough and tracking westward, the system organized, and as a result the Philippine Atmospheric, Geophysical and Astronomical Services Administration (PAGASA) designated the storm as Tropical Depression Toyang at 0000 UTC on November 25. Six hours later, the PAGASA upgraded Toyang to tropical storm status, though at the same time the JMA designated the system as a tropical depression. Despite its cyclogenesis, Toyang maintained monsoonal characteristics for a prolonged period of time. At 1800 UTC on November 28, the Japan Meteorological Agency (JMA) officially upgraded the cyclone to tropical storm status; the system's official name–Rumbia–was designated at that time.

Upon attaining tropical storm status, Rumbia was determined to have officially reached its peak intensity, with maximum sustained winds of 75 km/h (45 mph) and a minimum barometric pressure of 990 mbar (hPa; 29.23 inHg). (Note: All measurements and estimates of maximum sustained wind are sustained over a ten-minute period unless otherwise noted.) Concurrently, Rumbia's convection strengthened and increased in areal coverage, though persistent wind shear displaced much of the convection west of the circulation center. At 1800 UTC on November 30 (0200 on December 01 Philippine Standard Time), the JMA weakened the system to tropical depression status; at the same time Rumbia made landfall over the Central Philippines. Rumbia gradually weakened as it tracked across the archipelago, and on December 1 the depression became quasi-stationary for a transient period of time in the Tablas Strait. The following day, Rumbia entered the South China Sea as a highly diffused system. At 0600 UTC on December 2, the JMA declared Rumbia to have dissipated, while the Joint Typhoon Warning Center (JTWC) continued to monitor the system as an active tropical cyclone. Nonetheless, Rumbia remained highly disorganized, with multiple low-level circulation centers.

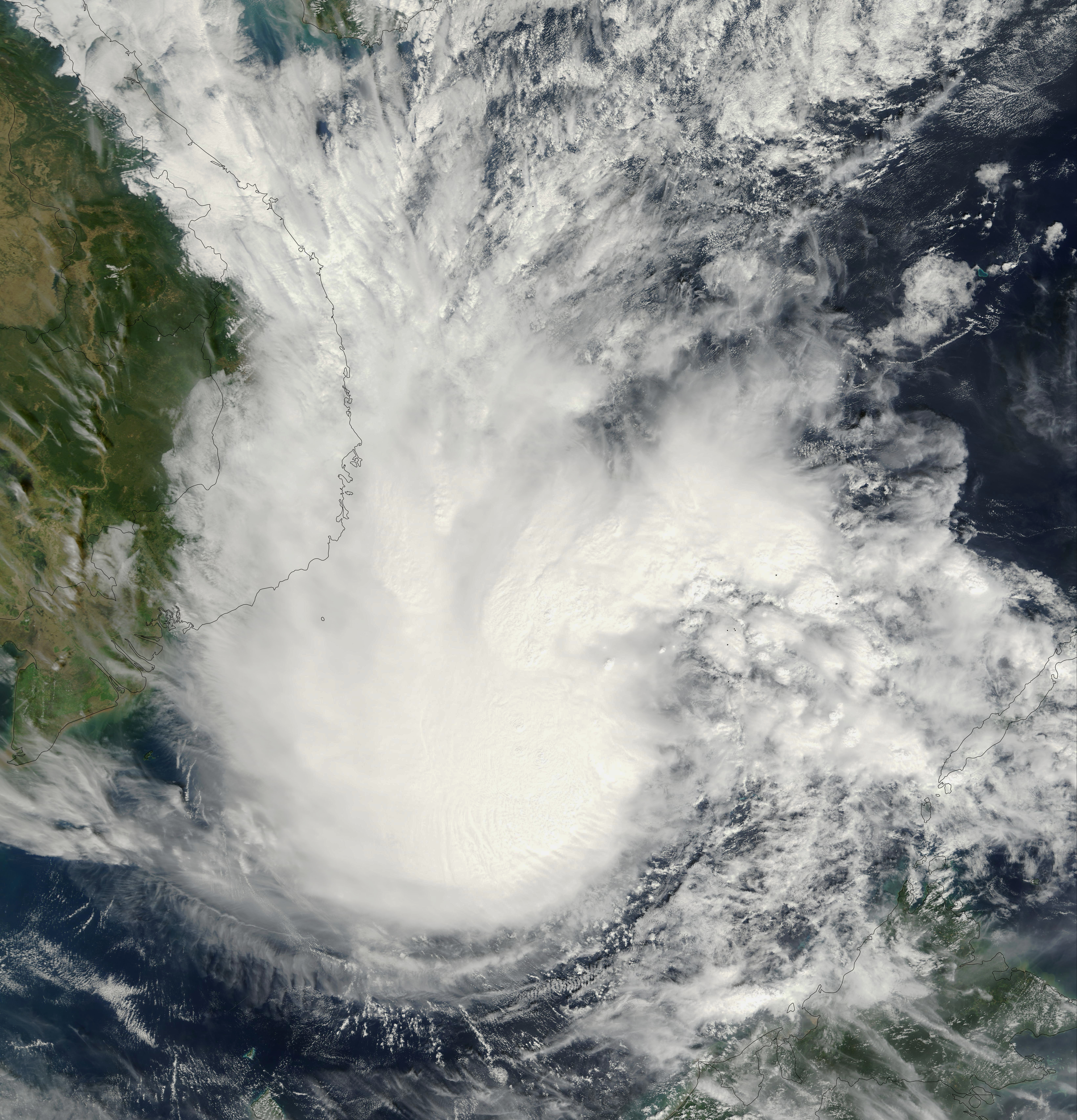
Rumbia shortly after regenerating into a tropical storm on December 5

Over the next few days, as the cyclone continued to track in a general westward direction, persistent inhibiting factors including the entrainment of cold air and wind shear prevented Rumbia from redeveloping. As a result, the depression was anticipated to gradually weaken until dissipation. On December 5, however, the cyclone moved into a favorable position under the axis of an upper-level ridge, allowing for Rumbia to intensify and regain tropical storm intensity at 1200 UTC while located 835 km (520 mi) southeast of Da Nang, Vietnam; despite the recent strengthening the JMA still considered the storm to have already dissipated. This period of strengthening was only temporary, as shearing conditions once again arose, weakening the system and thus resulting in its subsequent downgrade to tropical depression status late the following day. By December 7, Rumbia's main circulation center had become devoid of convection, and the JTWC issued their final warning on the system while the depression was located south of Vietnam.

== Preparations and impact ==
In preparation for Rumbia, the PAGASA issued high storm alerts for 16 provinces, and warned of potential flash floods and landslides. Residents of coastal locations were forced to evacuate. In Luzon, 1,500 passengers became stranded after ferry service from there to the central Philippines was suspended. Additional ferry passengers were stranded after services along a route from Sorsogon Province to Luzon were also suspended. Philippine Airlines cancelled ten flights along several different routes.

Rumbia cut power to the entirety of Surigao, and power outages occurred in neighboring locales. Flooding in Surigao had begun even before the tropical storm made landfall, as low-lying areas flooded and forced people to evacuate. In northern Mindanao, nine towns were flooded, resulting in the displacement of 1,640 people. A principal road linking Cagayan de Oro to Butuan was rendered impassable by the floods. Three people were killed in Cebu City, which was significantly impacted by the tropical storm. Power outages also occurred there, as well as in several other provinces. Landslides took place in the provinces of Bohol and Leyte. As a result of rising floodwaters, 4,100 people were put into temporary sheltering. Overall, the effects of Rumbia accrued US$1 million in damage and killed 48 people, in addition to leaving 70,000 others homeless.

== See also ==
- Other tropical cyclones named Rumbia
- Other tropical cyclones named Toyang
- Typhoon Hagupit (2014)
- Tropical Storm Jangmi (2014)
- Tropical Storm Kai-tak (2017)
- Tropical Storm Megi (2022)
- Typhoon Kalmaegi (2025)
