= Typhoon Muifa (2022) =

Pacific typhoon in 2022

Typhoon Muifa (Inday)
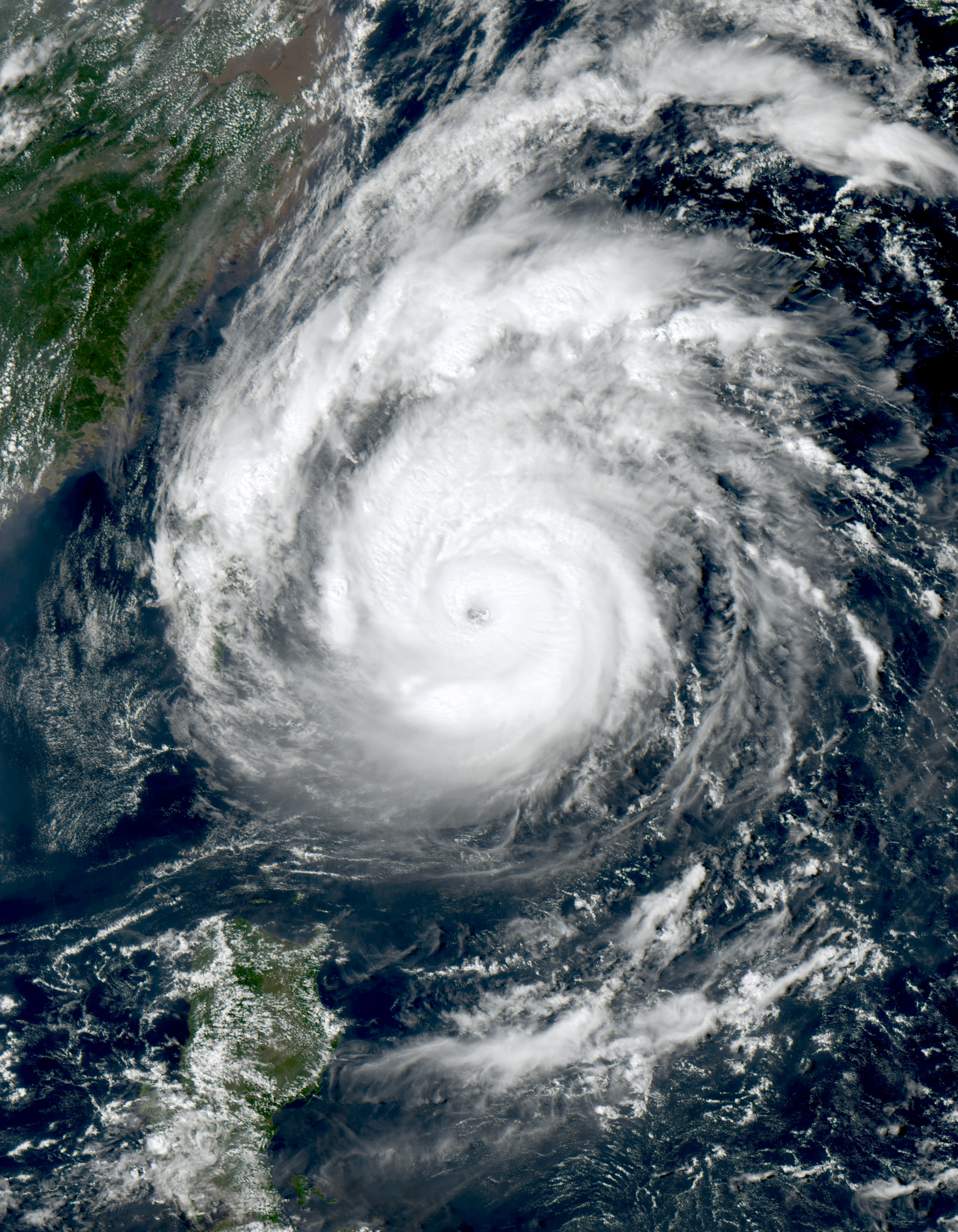
- Muifa at peak intensity while east of Taiwan on September 11

Meteorological history
- Formed: September 3, 2022
- Extratropical: September 16, 2022
- Dissipated: September 17, 2022

Very strong typhoon
- 10-minute sustained (JMA)
- Highest winds: 155 km/h (100 mph)
- Lowest pressure: 950 hPa (mbar); 28.05 inHg

Category 3-equivalent typhoon
- 1-minute sustained (SSHWS/JTWC)
- Highest winds: 205 km/h (125 mph)
- Lowest pressure: 946 hPa (mbar); 27.94 inHg

Overall effects
- Fatalities: 3 total
- Missing: 2
- Damage: $437 million (2022 USD)
- Areas affected: Philippines; Taiwan; Japan (Yaeyama Islands); East China; Korean Peninsula
- IBTrACS /
- Part of the 2022 Pacific typhoon season

Typhoon Muifa, (Note: The name Muifa (Cantonese: 梅花, [muːi˨˩ faː˥]) was contributed by Macau and means plum blossom (Prunus mume) in Cantonese.) known in the Philippines as Typhoon Inday, was a powerful tropical cyclone that affected East China, Taiwan, and the Ryukyu Islands in mid-September 2022. It was, at that time, the strongest typhoon to strike Shanghai since Typhoon Gloria until it was surpassed by Typhoon Bebinca two years later. It was the twelfth named storm and fourth typhoon of the 2022 Pacific typhoon season, having originated from an invest in the Pacific Ocean.

Muifa originated from a disturbance near the Philippine Sea, slowly tracking westward until its development into a tropical depression, where it began to move south westward. Muifa underwent rapid intensification as it approached eastern China, with maximum sustained winds of up to 155 km/h (95 mph) Right before its first landfall, Muifa was downgraded to a Category 3, then Muifa made its first landfall over eastern China on September 13 as a Category 1.

== Meteorological history ==
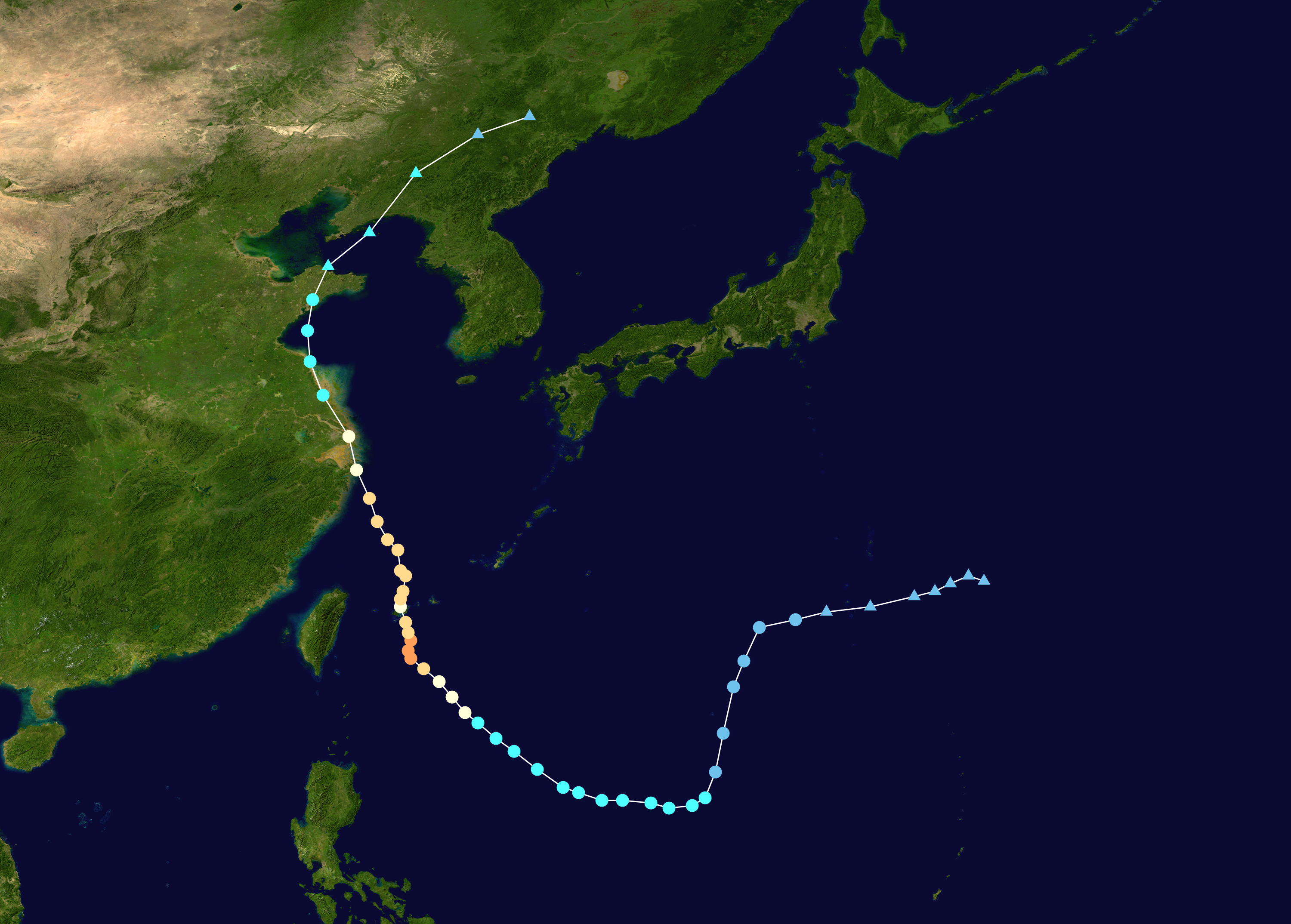
Map plotting the storm's track and intensity, according to the Saffir–Simpson scale Map key Saffir–Simpson scale Tropical depression (≤38 mph, ≤62 km/h) Tropical storm (39–73 mph, 63–118 km/h) Category 1 (74–95 mph, 119–153 km/h) Category 2 (96–110 mph, 154–177 km/h) Category 3 (111–129 mph, 178–208 km/h) Category 4 (130–156 mph, 209–251 km/h) Category 5 (≥157 mph, ≥252 km/h) Unknown Storm type Tropical cyclone Subtropical cyclone Extratropical cyclone, remnant low, tropical disturbance, or monsoon depression

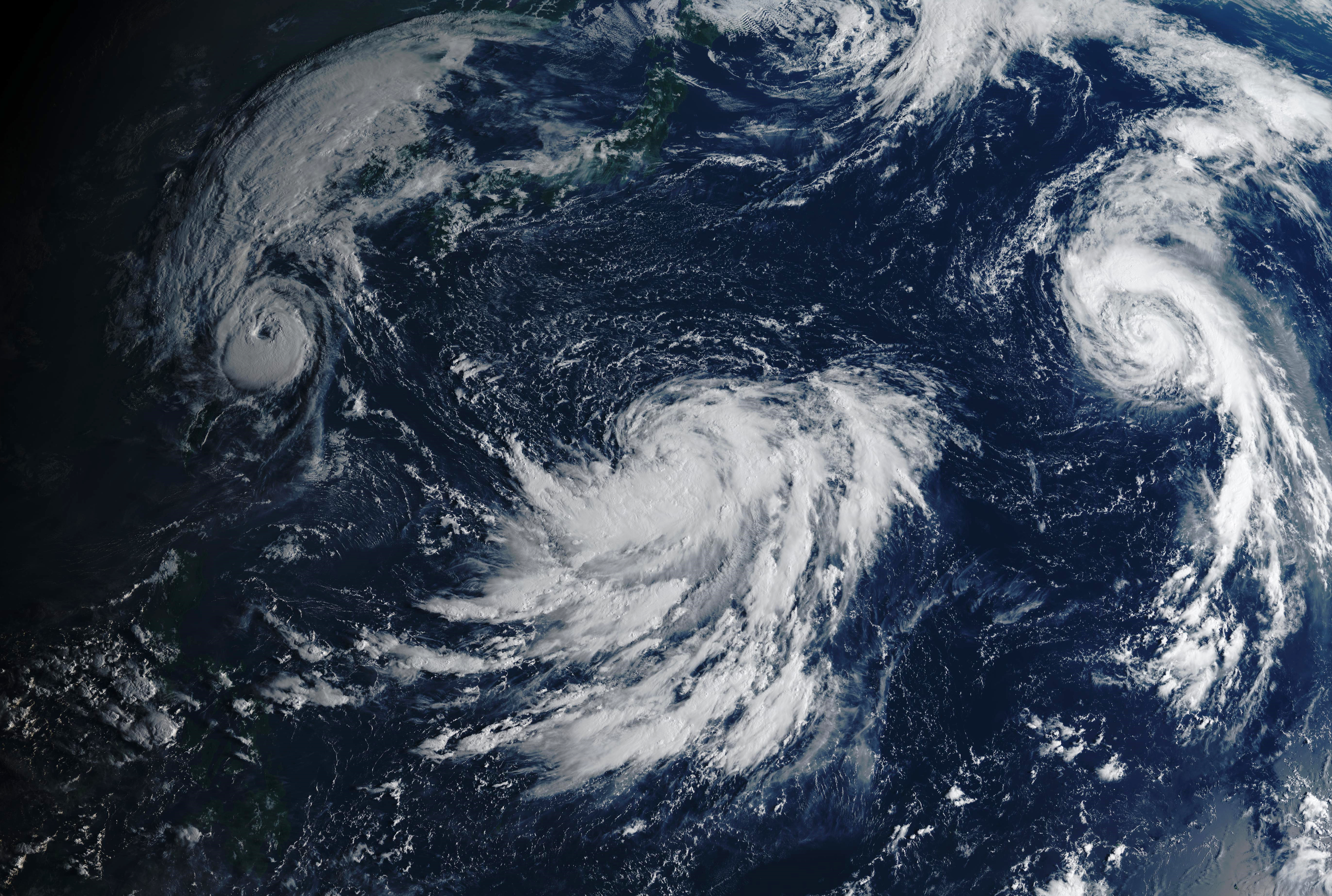
Typhoon Muifa (left), Tropical Storm Nanmadol (middle), and Typhoon Merbok (right) on September 13

The origins of Typhoon Muifa can be traced back to an area of disturbed weather on September 5. The disturbance favorable vertical wind shear, being offset by warm sea surface temperatures of around 30–31 °C (86–88 °F). A low-pressure area developed into a tropical depression, according to the Japan Meteorological Agency (JMA). Multispectral animated satellite imagery revealed a partially exposed low-level center with deep convection to the southeastern quadrant of its disturbance. At 06:00 UTC on September 6, the United States Joint Typhoon Warning Center (JTWC) issued a Tropical Cyclone Formation Alert to the exposed system.

Later around the same day, the JTWC initiated advisories on the system and classified it as Tropical Depression 14W. A broad low-level circulation indicate the development of a vertical hot tower over its convective. Early the next day, the JTWC upgraded the depression to a tropical storm. It eventually entered the Philippine Area of Responsibility (PAR) with PAGASA assigning the name Inday. Deepest formative maintained with a ragged central dense overcast continued to obscure low-level circulation center. By 00:00 UTC on September 8, the JMA upgraded the system to a tropical storm, assigning it the name Muifa. Muifa's center was elongated due to a tropical upper tropospheric trough from the north on the system. A well-defined deep convection is wrapped around the northwestern portions of the storm. Muifa's convective structure continued to improve as it flared up and rotated shear. microwave imaging revealed a developing, eye like-feature.

The storm's quickly intensified, and was upgraded to a severe tropical storm by the JMA on September 9. At 21:00 UTC that day, the JTWC also upgraded Muifa to a Category 1-equivalent typhoon, approximately 388 nautical miles (720 km; 445 mi) south of Kadena Air Base. Muifa convective activity had improved overall. Similarly, the JMA further upgraded Muifa to a typhoon on September 10. Muifa strengthened to Category 2-equivalent typhoon after deep convection becoming more symmetric in the 24 nautical miles (44 km; 28 mi) eye. Within the next three hours, the storm became a Category 3-equivalent typhoon.

Satellite imagery revealed a 20 nautical miles (37 km; 23 mi) round eye with core convection in the eyewall. Then, it reached peak intensity as a high-end Category 3-equivalent typhoon on September 11. Muifa begins to weaken gradually due to undergoing an eyewall replacement cycle. At 03:00 UTC on September 12, Muifa further weakened into a Category 2-equivalent typhoon as it wrapped around the eyewall. Muifa, then weakened steadily as it made landfall in Ishigaki Island.

Muifa exited the PAR at 12:40 PHT (4:40 UTC) on September 13. Satellite imagery revealed a 30 nautical miles (56 km; 35 mi) ragged eye around a convective banding. A well defined system with its deep convection wrapped around it. its eye structure slowly degraded. At 15:00 UTC on September 14, the JTWC further downgraded it to a Category 1-equivalent typhoon. The storm made landfall at this intensity on Zhoushan Island, before making a second landfall in Shanghai. At this time, it is the most powerful typhoon to strike Shanghai on record, beating out the previous record of Typhoon Gloria in 1949 but was later surpassed by Typhoon Bebinca in 2024. Meanwhile, the JMA downgraded the system to a severe tropical storm by 21:00 UTC of that day. At 03:00 UTC on September 15, the JTWC downgraded it to a tropical storm. Muifa made third and fourth landfalls on Shandong and Liaoning. The JMA followed suit later that day, and declaring it tropical storm. Muifa continued to deteriorate as it tracked the Yellow Sea, and later dissipated late on September 16.

== Preparations and impact ==
=== Ryukyu Islands ===
Muifa caused many high waves and mudslides throughout the Ryukyu Islands. Heavy rain hit Ishigaki Island.

=== Taiwan ===
Taiwan was hit by 140 km (86 mph) winds. Heavy amounts of rain hit Keelung, Taipei, Hsinchu, and Taichung. The Council of Agriculture (COA) issued 15 "red alerts" and 14 "yellow alerts" for landslides throughout Northern Taiwan.

=== China ===
Muifa caused much damage and heavy rainfall throughout Eastern China, most of it in towns close to the populous Yangtze River delta. Over 230 million people were affected in throughout the delta, with over 1.3 million people evacuated from Zhoushan, where powerful rain bands hit the city. Muifa brought heavy rains to Shanghai, resulting in many ports near the city being closed. Ferry and shipping traffic was suspended and fishing boats were called into port. Ports near Ningbo were closed.

=== Elsewhere ===
Heavy rain hit North Korea.

== See also ==
- Weather of 2022
- Tropical cyclones in 2022
- Typhoon Mamie (1985) – the only other tropical cyclone to make landfall in Shanghai at typhoon intensity.
- Typhoon Damrey (2012) – a tropical cyclone that hit the same areas as Muifa 10 years ago.
- Tropical Storm Ampil (2018) - a tropical cyclone that caused moderate damages in Shanghai and the areas that also hit by Muifa 4 years ago, it also had the same local name as of Muifa.
- Typhoon In-fa (2021) – a minimal typhoon that also affected the Shanghai metropolitan area and East China.
- Typhoon Hinnamnor (2022) – another typhoon which took a similar southwesterly path in the Philippine Sea a few days prior to Muifa.
- Typhoon Bebinca (2024) – the next typhoon to impact Shanghai and East China.
