= Typhoon Bebinca =

Pacific typhoon in 2024

Typhoon Bebinca (Ferdie)
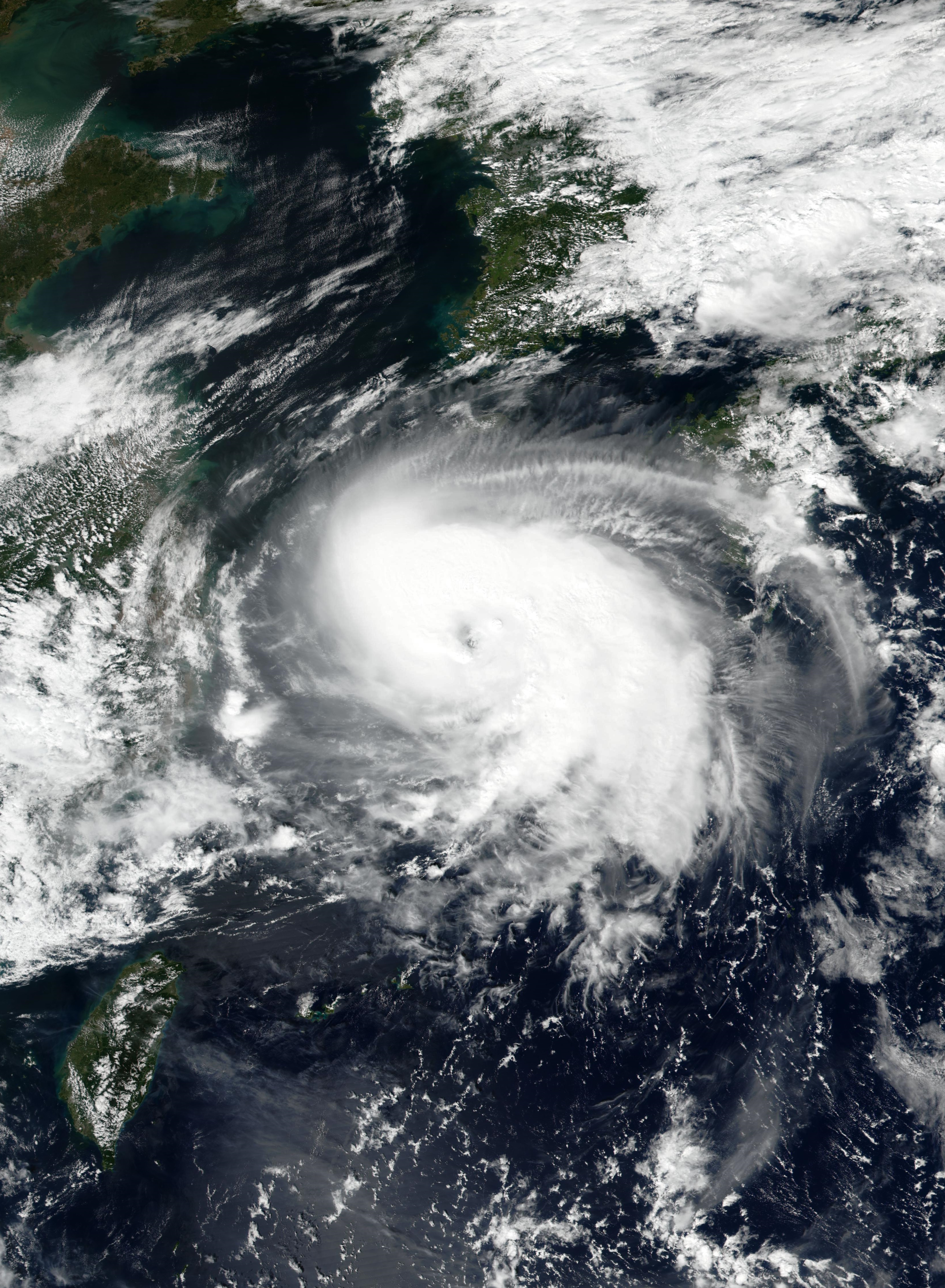
- Bebinca approaching East China near its peak intensity on September 15

Meteorological history
- Formed: September 9, 2024
- Dissipated: September 18, 2024

Typhoon
- 10-minute sustained (JMA)
- Highest winds: 140 km/h (85 mph)
- Lowest pressure: 965 hPa (mbar); 28.50 inHg

Category 1-equivalent typhoon
- 1-minute sustained (SSHWS/JTWC)
- Highest winds: 140 km/h (85 mph)
- Lowest pressure: 963 hPa (mbar); 28.44 inHg

Overall effects
- Fatalities: 8
- Injuries: 12
- Missing: 2
- Damage: $1.42 billion (2024 USD)
- Areas affected: Guam, Northern Mariana Islands, Philippines, Ryukyu Islands, Eastern China, Central China (particularly Henan)
- Part of the 2024 Pacific typhoon season

Typhoon Bebinca, (Note: The name Bebinca was contributed by Macau and refers to a kind of milk pudding popular there.) known in the Philippines as Ferdie, was a strong and moderately long-lived tropical cyclone that affected East China, Guam, Philippines and the Ryukyu Islands in mid-September 2024. Bebinca became the strongest typhoon to hit Shanghai since Typhoon Gloria in 1949 and the first typhoon to do so since Typhoon Muifa of 2022. It is the thirteenth named storm and sixth typhoon of the 2024 Pacific typhoon season.

Bebinca originated as an atmospheric convection 385 km (239 mi) east-northeast of Kosrae on September 5. It intensified into tropical storm on September 10 before turning west-northwest due to interaction with an upper vortex. By September 13, as it entered the Philippine Area of Responsibility, the Philippine Atmospheric, Geophysical and Astronomical Services Administration named it Ferdie, and it eventually moved across the Ryukyu Islands, where both the Joint Typhoon Warning Center and the JMA upgraded it to a minimal typhoon. On September 16, Bebinca made landfall over Lingang New City in Shanghai, China as a Category 1-equivalent typhoon. Inland, Bebinca quickly weakened into a tropical storm due to land interaction that same day while maintaining west-northwest movement. The JMA tracked the system until it was last noted on September 18.

Although Bebinca did not make landfall in the Philippines, its associated trough and the southwest monsoon brought heavy rains to many regions, damaging or destroying nearly 97 homes and displacing over 36,626 people. The storm caused at least six fatalities, with two people missing and eleven injuries. Bebinca caused some damage in Guam, leading to storm warnings being issued. In Japan, thousands of homes lost power in Amami. In China, Bebinca caused two fatalities and one injury. Overall, Bebinca caused an estimated US$1.42 billion in damage in China and US$22 million in the Philippines.

== Meteorological history ==
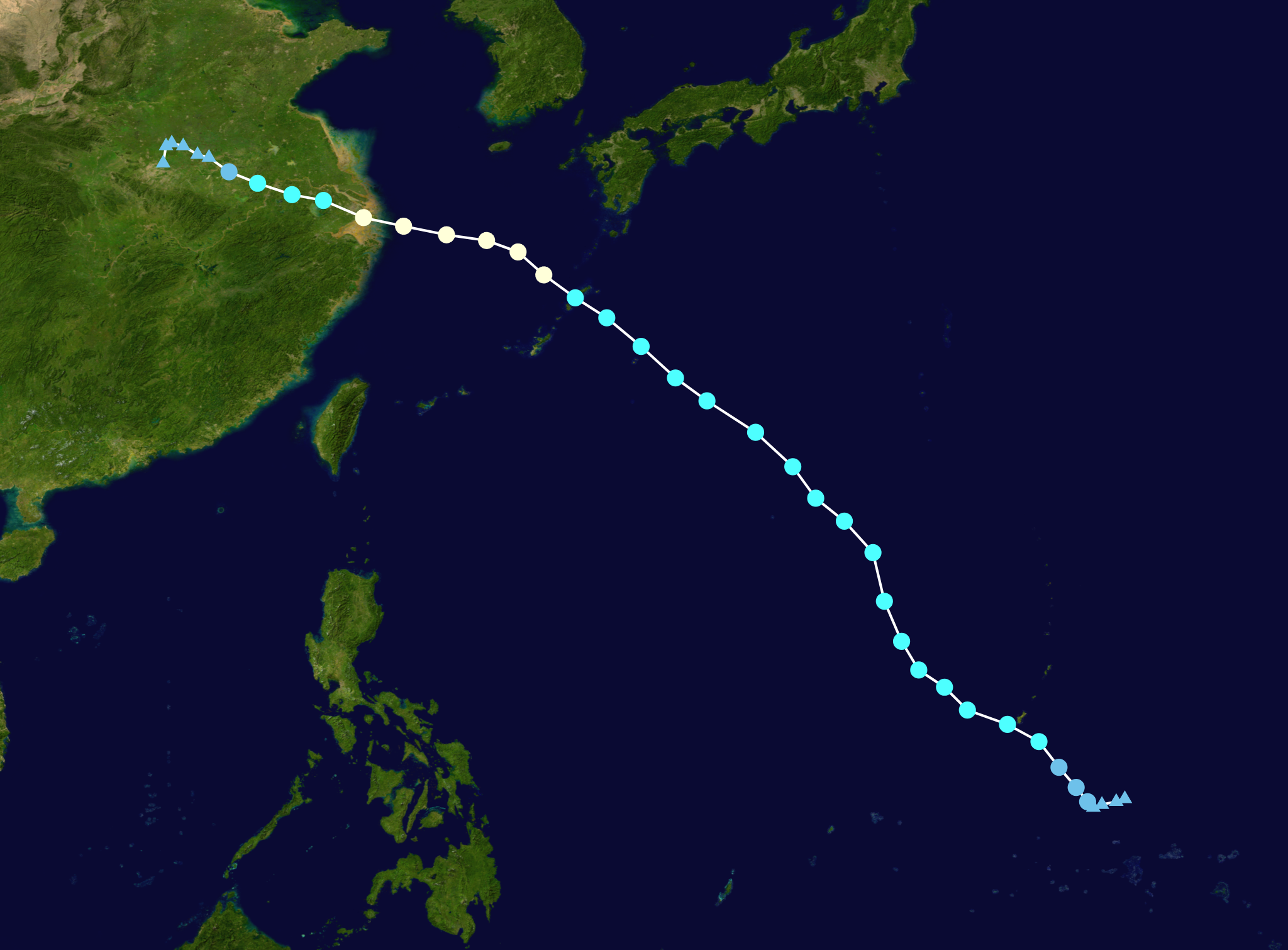
Map plotting the storm's track and intensity, according to the Saffir–Simpson scale Map key Saffir–Simpson scale Tropical depression (≤38 mph, ≤62 km/h) Tropical storm (39–73 mph, 63–118 km/h) Category 1 (74–95 mph, 119–153 km/h) Category 2 (96–110 mph, 154–177 km/h) Category 3 (111–129 mph, 178–208 km/h) Category 4 (130–156 mph, 209–251 km/h) Category 5 (≥157 mph, ≥252 km/h) Unknown Storm type Tropical cyclone Subtropical cyclone Extratropical cyclone, remnant low, tropical disturbance, or monsoon depression

Typhoon Bebinca originated from an area of atmospheric convection 390 km (240 mi) east-northeast of Kosrae, Micronesia, on September 5. The system featured intense deep convection over a large area, supported by favorable conditions for tropical cyclogenesis, such as warm sea surface temperatures of 28–29 °C (82–84 °F), moderate vertical wind shear and good poleward outflow. At 02:30 UTC on September 9, the United States Joint Typhoon Warning Center (JTWC) issued a tropical cyclone formation alert, noting that the system had become well-defined with formative banding in the eastern quadrants. A few hours later, both the Japan Meteorological Agency (JMA) and the JTWC followed suit and upgraded the tropical depression, with the latter designating the system as 14W. On September 10, the depression intensified into a tropical storm and was named Bebinca by the JMA, as it consolidated with a central dense overcast (CDO) feature obscuring its circulation center 130 km (80 mi) from Guam. The system then turned west-northwestward due to interaction with a subtropical ridge to the north. Guam radar imagery showed a well-defined surface circulation, with curved convective bands extending southward from the circulation center and wrapping around the northern part of the system into its western periphery.

Typhoon Bebinca making landfall over Lingang New City in Pudong, Shanghai, China on September 16

Around 00:00 UTC on September 11, the JMA upgraded it to a severe tropical storm, citing Dvorak technique—a method of determining a tropical cyclone's intensity based on satellite appearance. On September 13, the JMA reported that the storm had weakened to a tropical storm due to its near-surface circulation being fully exposed and its banding being fragmented along the northern edge. A broad tail of deep monsoonal flow and a tropical upper tropospheric trough cell to the west continued to infuse dry air into the storm's mid-level core. By 06:00 PHT (10:00 UTC), Bebinca had entered the Philippine Area of Responsibility (PAR) and was given the local name Ferdie by PAGASA and exited the PAR a few hours later. Bebinca then shifted northwestward along the northern edge of a deep subtropical high, and the JMA reported that the storm had regained severe tropical storm status. Satellite imagery revealed a compact, circular system with enhanced radial outflow and flaring convection in the northwest quadrant, leading both the JMA and JTWC to upgrade it to a minimal typhoon the next day as it moved across the Ryukyu Islands; meanwhile, Bebinca developed a ragged eye feature and maintained a symmetrical CDO on the late hours of September 2.

The JMA reported that Bebinca reached its peak intensity at 00:00 UTC on September 15 with 10-minute sustained winds of 140 km/h (85 mph) and a central pressure of 965 hPa (28.50 inHg); the JTWC then reported that the typhoon reached Category 1-equivalent intensity on the Saffir-Simpson scale with the same wind speeds. On September 16, at around 07:30 CST (23:30 UTC the previous day), Bebinca made landfall in Lingang New City, Shanghai, China, becoming the strongest typhoon to hit the area since Typhoon Gloria in 1949, with a microwave eye feature spanning 46 kilometres (25 nmi) and convective bands extending south-southwestward. Shortly after landfall, the JTWC discontinued warnings on the system. Inland, Bebinca quickly diminished to a tropical storm due to land interaction, with the JTWC downgrading the system into a tropical depression at 00:00 UTC on September 17, with the JMA tracking the system until it was last noted that same day. The system turned into a disturbance at 09:00 UTC on September 18, officially dissipating three hours later.

== Preparations and impact ==
=== Philippines ===
Small waterborne vehicles, like motor bancas, were advised to take precautionary measures because of the storm. The province of Antique evacuated 545 families because of the storm, suspending classes at all levels. The province provided food packs for the evacuees. According to the National Disaster Risk Reduction and Management Council, 1,381 individuals were preemptively evacuated, while classes were suspended in 244 areas, including nine municipalities that also ceased work operations. The storm-associated trough and southwest monsoon led to heavy rains that damaged or destroyed nearly 97 homes in the Philippines, displacing over 36,626 people and causing infrastructure damage estimated at ₱200,000 (US$4,060.91). In total, 203,197 people were affected, with at least six fatalities all caused by falling trees. Four of those fatalities consisted of children aboard a tricycle in Malabang, Lanao del Sur, and while two took place in the Zamboanga Peninsula. Two missing persons and eleven injuries were reported. Additionally, power outages occurred in 18 cities and municipalities, while 40 roads were blocked and six bridges were rendered impassable. Bebinca also caused ₱1.09 billion (US$22.13 million) in agricultural damage and affected 24,247 hectares (59,920 acres) of farmland.

=== China ===
Bebinca and rainfall affecting trees in Jiading, Shanghai

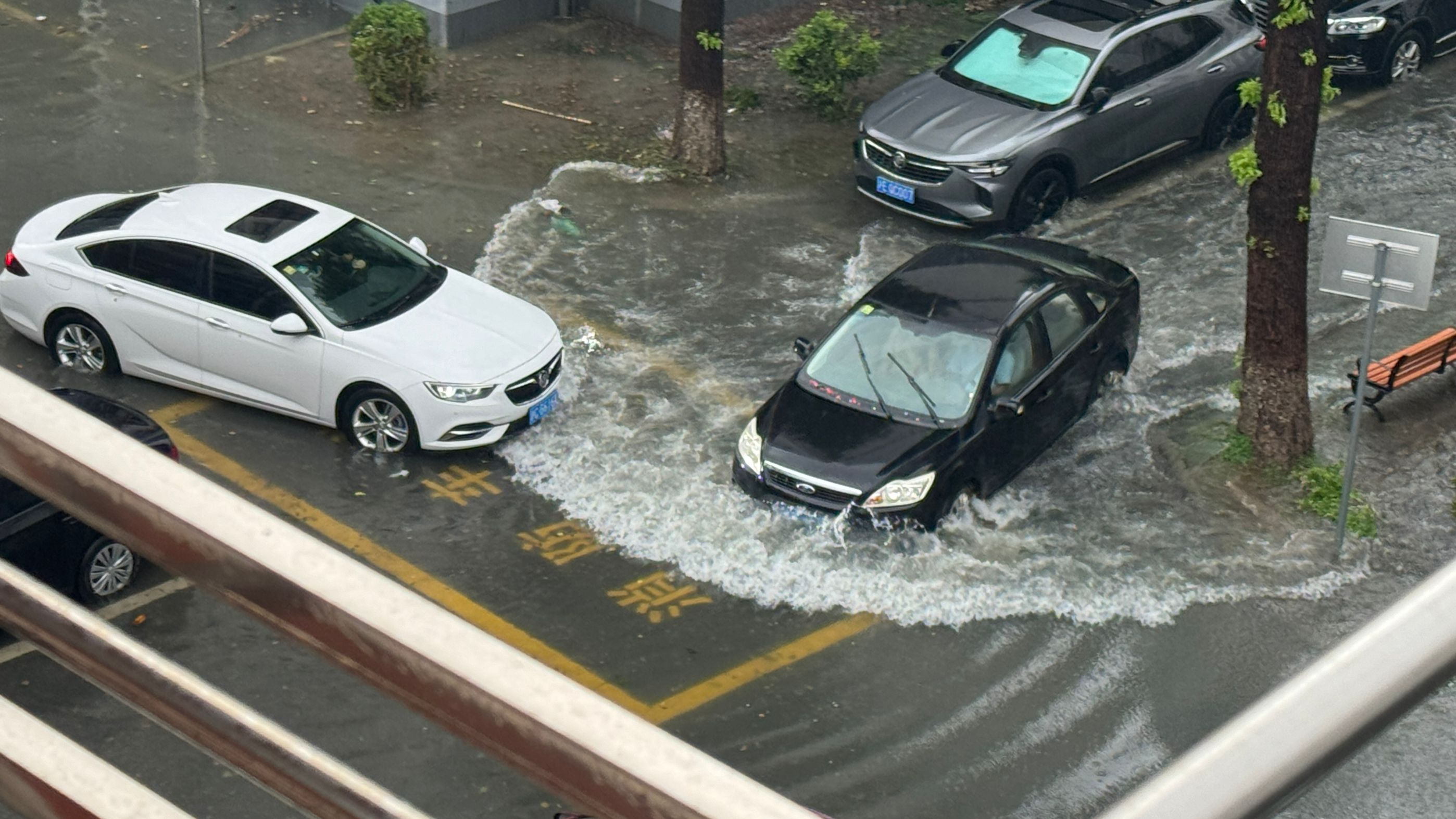
Heavy rains from Bebinca caused a lot of water to accumulate on Shanghai's roads

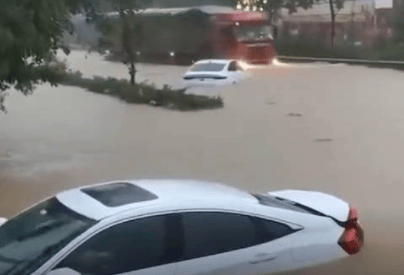
Flood caused by Bebinca in Xiao County, Anhui

On September 13, Fujian Provincial Flood Control Office required all fishing boats in a certain area on East China Sea to evacuate to immediate offshore area, as the route of Bebinca wasn't easy to predict. By September 14, the Zhejiang provincial government declared increased alertness, dispatched humanitarian employees, and ordered the relocation of anchored boats, construction netting and tourists. On September 15, the China Meteorological Administration issued a red alert for a typhoon, forecasting intense gales and heavy rainfall in eastern China. State media reported that 414,000 people were evacuated across Shanghai and that 56,000 rescue workers were deployed. Shengsi temporarily closed all of its passenger ship service, and multiple trains and flights were cancelled in Zhejiang. Anhui issued a yellow alert for the typhoon. Due to Bebinca, Shanghai Pudong International Airport and Shanghai Hongqiao International Airport cancelled all flights, and Shanghai Disneyland closed on September 16. All highways inside the city were closed, while driving speeds were limited to 40 km/h (25 mph). 570 passenger trains were cancelled in Shanghai. Jiangsu closed highways and bridges over the Yangtze River, as well as recalled fishing boats. Suzhou suspended takeaway delivery services, and Wuxi suspended bus operation in the afternoon. Nanjing dispatched emergency rescue personnel across the city in advance.

EDC China in Suzhou, scheduled for September 15 and 16 were cancelled when typhoon hit Shanghai, south of Suzhou on a planned EDC China date of September 15 and 16. On September 17, Shandong Provincial Department of Water Resources arranged and deployed preventive and response measures as the typhoon was forecasted to bring significant rainfall to southwester part of the province. In Henan Province, Both Xinxiang and Kaifeng decided to suspend classes of middle and primary schools for one day and Zhengzhou launched IV emergency response against flood.

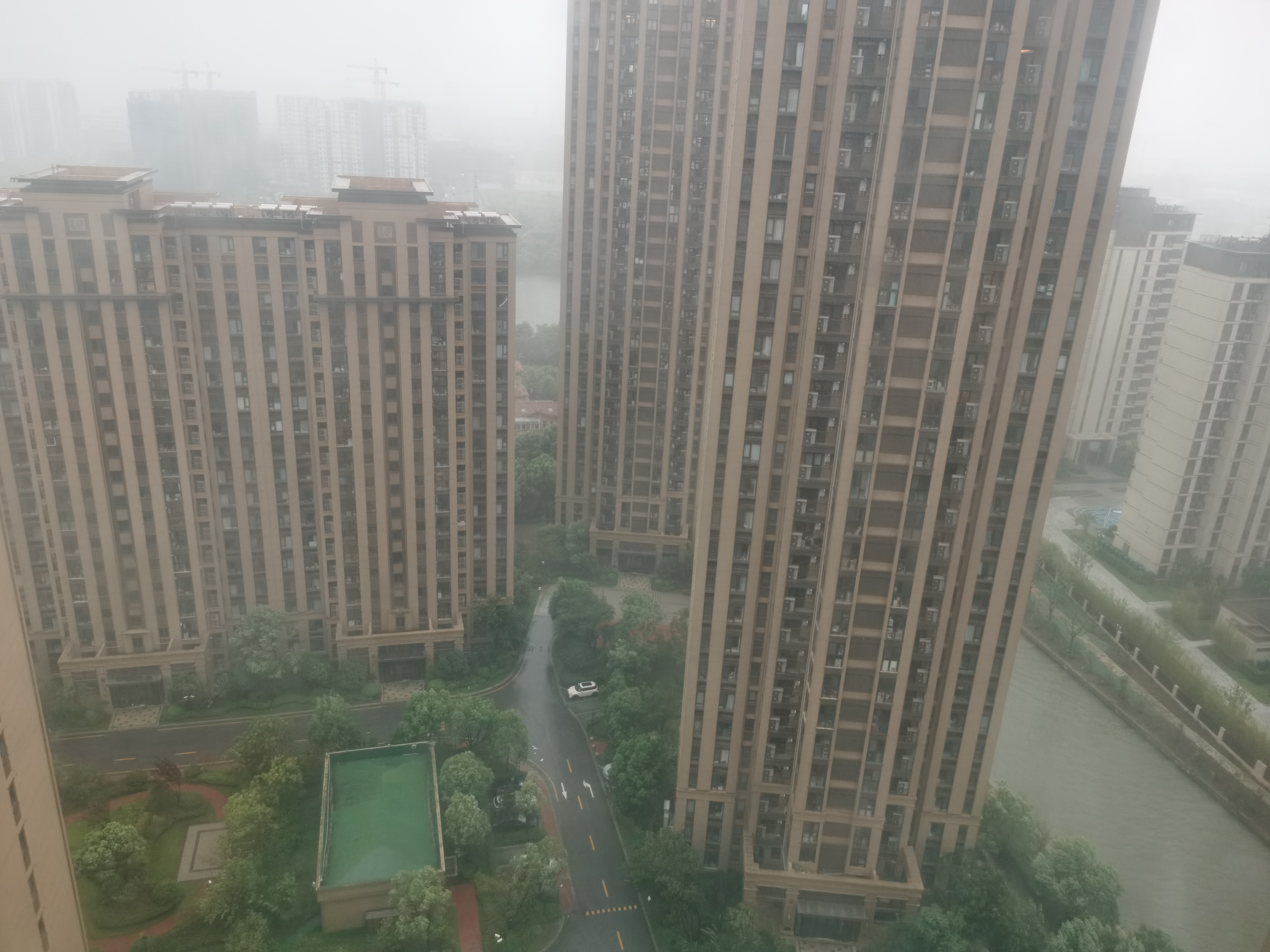
Conditions in Kunshan, Suzhou ahead of Bebinca on September 16.

Bebinca became the second storm to hit China within a few weeks, following Typhoon Yagi's landfall on Hainan Island in the southern part of the country. At least 30,000 households lost power. Four homes were damaged, over 10,000 trees were damaged or uprooted, and 53 hectares (132 acres) of farmland were flooded in Shanghai. Two people were killed after they were electrocuted by a fallen power line in Kunshan, while a falling tree injured one person in Chongming Island. As Bebinca moved inland, it brought extremely heavy rainfall to the border regions of Henan, Anhui, Shandong and Jiangsu, leading to severe waterlogging and flooding in several counties. Floodwater didn't recede in Dangshan until September 22. On the same day, citizens in Yongcheng, Shangqiu posted videos online, saying that the city was still soaked in water and that the water level was rising. Local government have been working day and night to rescue the trapped and drain the floodwater, and farmers are attempting to harvest crops to recover losses.

Economic losses were estimated to be ¥10 billion (US$1.42 billion). In a report from the China Meteorological Administration to the 19th Integrated Workshop of ESCAP/WMO Typhoon Committee in November 2024, total damage from Bebinca in China may have reached 550 billion RMB (US$75.8 billion).

=== Elsewhere ===
When the storm passed the Pacific Ocean, Guam was affected, leading to a storm warning all across the territory. After the storm passed the territory, the Government of Guam declared Condition of Readiness Three, a small warning that allows people to go to work, not affecting businesses and the territorial government. Minimal damage was reported in Guam, with only some uprooted banana trees and damaged campaign signs. The storm was forecast to pass through Okinawa. Power outages affected 7,240 households in Amami.

== See also ==
- Weather of 2024
- Tropical cyclones in 2024
- Typhoon Damrey (2012)
- Tropical Storm Ampil (2018)
- Typhoon Muifa (2022)
- Tropical Storm Pulasan (2024)
