= Tropical Storm Ampil =

Pacific severe tropical storm in 2018

Severe Tropical Storm Ampil (Inday)
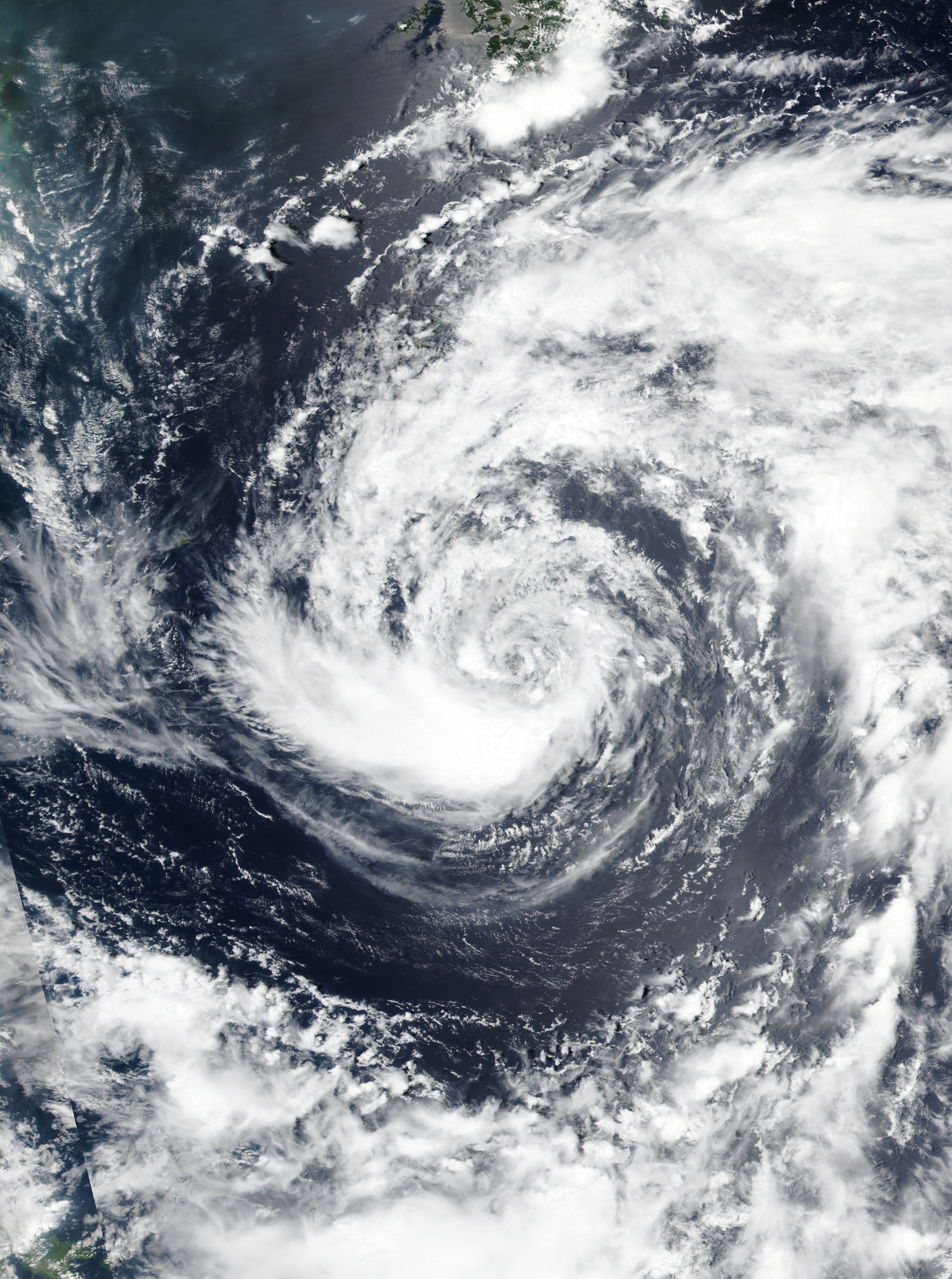
- Severe Tropical Storm Ampil approaching the Ryukyu Islands on July 20

Meteorological history
- Formed: July 17, 2018
- Dissipated: July 26, 2018

Severe tropical storm
- 10-minute sustained (JMA)
- Highest winds: 95 km/h (60 mph)
- Lowest pressure: 985 hPa (mbar); 29.09 inHg

Tropical storm
- 1-minute sustained (SSHWS/JTWC)
- Highest winds: 100 km/h (65 mph)
- Lowest pressure: 982 hPa (mbar); 29.00 inHg

Overall effects
- Fatalities: 1 total
- Damage: $246 million (2018 USD)
- Areas affected: Ryukyu Islands, East and Northeast China
- IBTrACS
- Part of the 2018 Pacific typhoon season

Severe Tropical Storm Ampil, (Note: The name Ampil (Khmer: អម្ពិល, [ʔɑm.ˈpɨl]) was contributed by Cambodia and means tamarind (Tamarindus indica) in Khmer language.) known in the Philippines as Severe Tropical Storm Inday, was a tropical cyclone that caused moderate damage in the Ryukyu Islands and East and Northeast China in late July 2018. The tenth named storm of the annual typhoon season, Ampil developed into a tropical depression east of Luzon on July 17. The system gradually strengthened over the following days amid a marginally favorable environment and became a severe tropical storm late on July 19 as it moved northwest. Maintaining its strength, Ampil passed over Okinawa Island from July 20 to 21. Thereafter, Ampil weakened slightly while crossing the East China Sea, before making landfall in Shanghai, China, on July 22. The system weakened slowly over land and degraded to a tropical depression on July 23. The system turned eastwards as it continued weakening over land, diminishing to a remnant low on July 25 and dissipating fully a day later over the Russian Far East.

Ampil produced gusty winds across the Ryukyu Islands from July 20 to 21, causing disruptions to transport and businesses. Moisture extending from Ampil also caused thunderstorms in Fukuoka. From July 22 to 25, Ampil generated heavy rains across much of East and Northeast China, affecting more than 2.3 million people and causing record-breaking flooding within the watershed of the Songhua River. About 387,000 people were evacuated from coastal areas in Shanghai, Jiangsu, and Zhejiang. Transport was severely disrupted, with 600 flights into Shanghai canceled and ferries and rail services suspended. A person in Shandong was killed by a fallen tree. About 7,200 houses were damaged or destroyed, while 169,000 hectares (420,000 acres) of cropland were damaged. Direct economic losses reached ¥1.63 billion (US$246 million). (Note: All currencies are in their 2018 values and are converted to United States dollars using data from the International Monetary Fund published by the World Bank.)

== Meteorological history ==
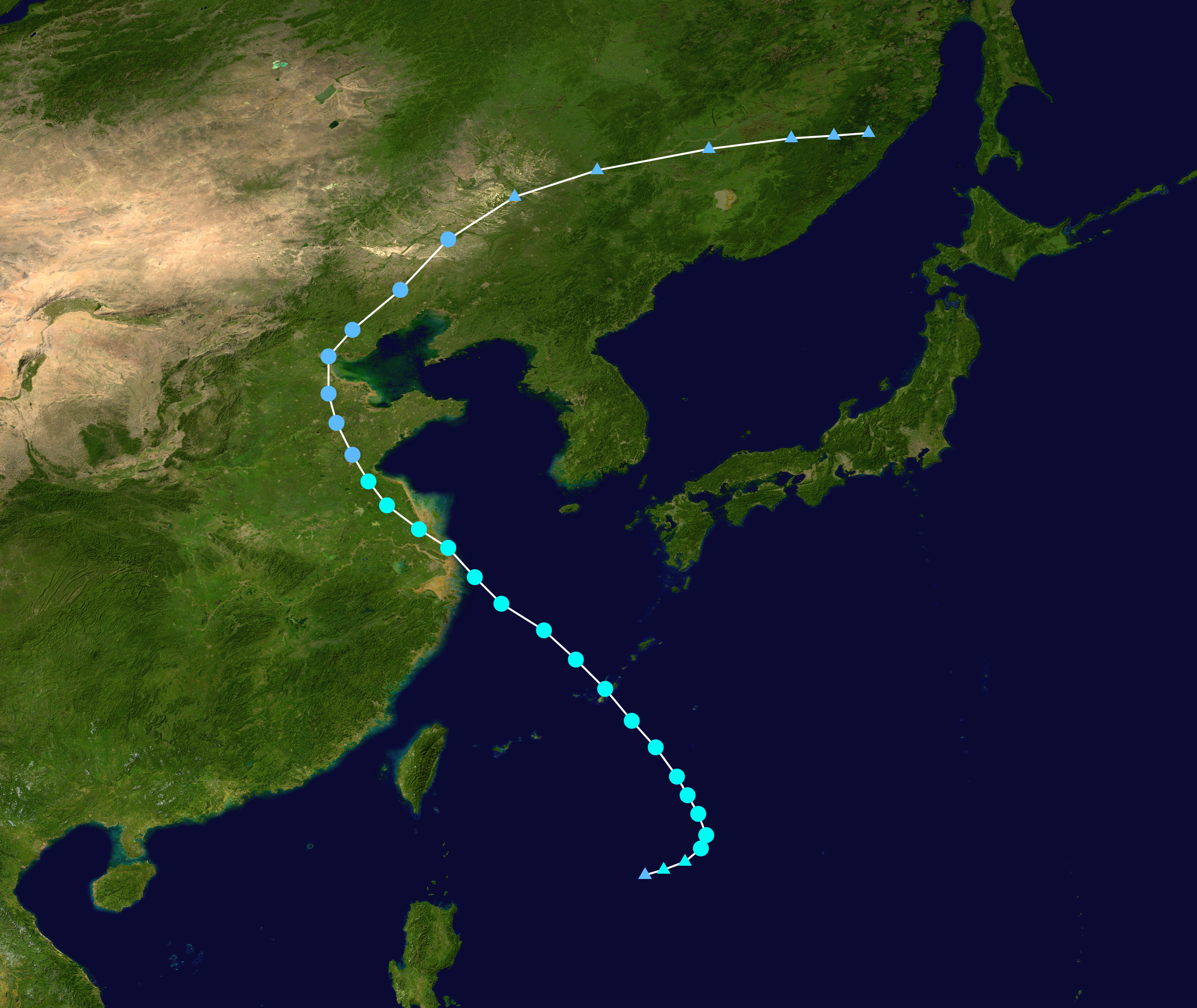
Map plotting the storm's track and intensity, according to the Saffir–Simpson scale Map key Saffir–Simpson scale Tropical depression (≤38 mph, ≤62 km/h) Tropical storm (39–73 mph, 63–118 km/h) Category 1 (74–95 mph, 119–153 km/h) Category 2 (96–110 mph, 154–177 km/h) Category 3 (111–129 mph, 178–208 km/h) Category 4 (130–156 mph, 209–251 km/h) Category 5 (≥157 mph, ≥252 km/h) Unknown Storm type Tropical cyclone Subtropical cyclone Extratropical cyclone, remnant low, tropical disturbance, or monsoon depression

A broad area of disturbed weather developed within the monsoon trough on July 15 roughly 1,215 km (755 mi) south-southeast of Okinawa. The Japan Meteorological Agency (JMA) declared that the system consolidated into a tropical depression at 12:00 UTC on July 17. (Note: The Japan Meteorological Agency is the official Regional Specialized Meteorological Center for the western Pacific Ocean.) The system initially moved east-northeastwards around a ridge near the Equator, while gradually organizing amid generally favorable upper-level wind patterns and high sea surface temperatures of 29–30 °C (84–86 °F). As the system was located within the Philippine Area of Responsibility, the Philippine Atmospheric, Geophysical and Astronomical Services Administration (PAGASA) gave the depression the local name Inday at 03:00 UTC on July 18. Just hours later, the JMA stated that the depression became a tropical storm at 12:00 UTC and named it Ampil; (Note: The name Ampil (Khmer: អម្ពិល, [ʔɑm.ˈpɨl]) was contributed by Cambodia and means tamarind (Tamarindus indica) in Khmer.) the Joint Typhoon Warning Center (JTWC) made a similar declaration six hours later. The recently named tropical storm was large and asymmetric – a large rainband extended over the southern half of the system, while the low-level circulation center was exposed. Intensification was slow as upper-level winds restricted outflow in Ampil's northern half, preventing thunderstorms from developing there. This left the low-level circulation elongated, hindering quicker consolidation of the system. On July 19, Ampil began to turn northwestwards as a strong subtropical ridge to the north began to dominate the steering pattern.

Later on July 19, the unfavorable upper-level winds diminished slightly and allowed thunderstorms to develop over Ampil's center of circulation, resulting in it becoming well-defined. The JMA reported that Ampil became a severe tropical storm at 18:00 UTC, as its 10-minute sustained winds increased to 95 km/h (60 mph). The system's central pressure also dropped to an estimated 985 hPa (mbar; 29.09 inHg). Ampil then maintained this intensity for the next two days due to the limiting effect of surrounding dry air, while continuing to track northwestwards. In the meantime, Ampil exited the Philippine Area of Responsibility at 18:00 UTC on July 20, and passed over Okinawa Island during the night of July 20 to 21. According to the JMA, weakening took place on July 22 as the storm's winds decreased slightly; conversely the JTWC stated that Ampil's 1-minute sustained winds increased to 100 km/h (65 mph) at 00:00 UTC. Around 04:30 UTC, Ampil made landfall over eastern Chongming Island in Shanghai, becoming only the third tropical cyclone to make landfall in Shanghai since 1949. The system weakened slowly as it pushed inland, degrading to a tropical depression on July 23. The depression turned northwards then eastwards while moving over Northeast China on July 24, before degenerating to a remnant low-pressure area by 00:00 UTC on July 25. The leftover system eventually dissipated over the Russian Far East while still inland by 12:00 UTC on July 26.

== Preparations and impact ==
=== Japan ===
On July 20, the JMA issued a storm warning (Japanese: 暴風警報) for Okinawa Island. The warning was canceled the next day, after Ampil passed the island. Kitadaitōjima recorded wind gusts of 113 km/h (70 mph). A total of 29 people were evacuated in Okinawa Prefecture. Adverse weather conditions caused 106 flights and 112 sailings to be canceled from July 20 to 21, affecting almost 15,000 people. The Okinawa Urban Monorail suspended operations for the morning of July 21. The Okinawa Prefectural Museum and the Urasoe Art Museum closed for the morning on July 21. Shuri Castle was also closed during a similar time period. Major department stores across Okinawa were closed till about noon on July 21.

Further northeast, moist air from Ampil generated thunderstorms in and around Fukuoka. A lightning strike damaged the runway at Fukuoka Airport, forcing it to close for an hour and resulting in 70 flights being canceled. Lightning also disrupted signaling along the Kagoshima Main Line and Kashii Line, while heavy rains caused the Hitahikosan Line to temporarily suspend services.

=== China ===
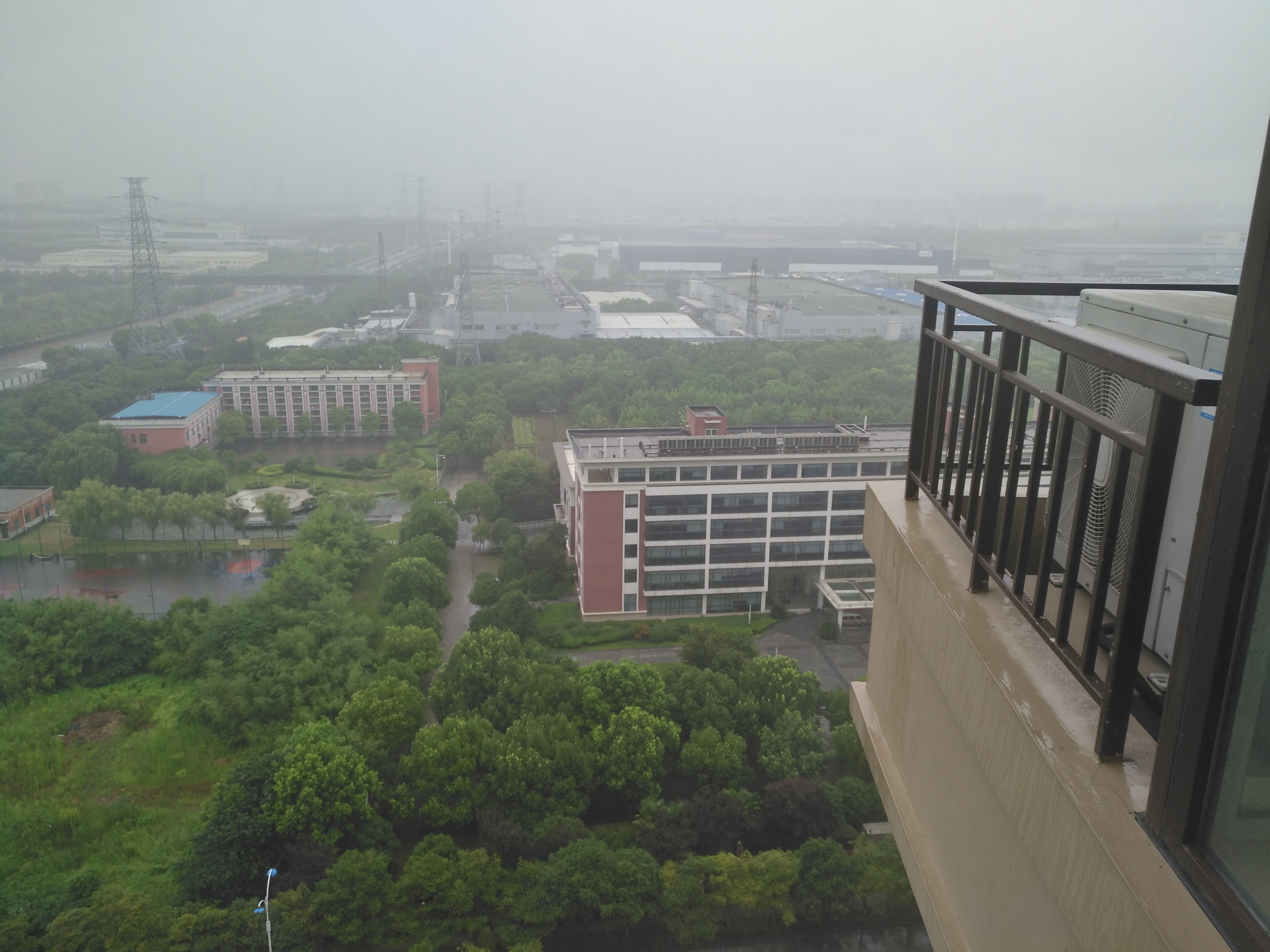
Conditions in Suzhou ahead of Ampil on July 22

Ahead of Ampil on July 20, the Chinese National Meteorological Center issued a yellow alert, the third-highest rating on their warning system. The Shanghai Meteorological Bureau upgraded this further to an orange alert on July 21. A total of 387,100 people across Shanghai, Jiangsu, and Zhejiang were evacuated, including 192,700 in Shanghai, and 40,000 ships across the region returned to port for shelter. More than 600 flights at Shanghai's Pudong and Hongqiao airports were canceled and high-speed rail services were disrupted. Ferry lines across the Yangtze River suspended operations. Temporary speed limits were imposed on expressways and bridges crossing the Huangpu River, while the Donghai Bridge was closed to traffic. The observation decks of Shanghai Tower and Shanghai World Financial Center were shut. Elsewhere, warnings were issued in Shandong in anticipation of geologic hazards resulting from heavy rainfall.

When Ampil made landfall in eastern Chongming District on July 22, it became the only third tropical cyclone to make landfall over Shanghai since 1949 (the other instances were in 1977 and 1989). Strong winds occurred in the Zhoushan area, with a gust to 33.1 m/s (119 km/h; 74 mph) recorded in Jigu Jiao (Chinese: 鸡骨礁) and a gust to 28.0 m/s (101 km/h; 63 mph) recorded in Xiaoyangshan (Chinese: 小洋山). An automated weather station on Hengsha Island recorded a rainfall total of 112.8 mm (4.44 in). As Ampil tracked further inland from July 22 to 25, it produced a large swath of heavy rain across East and Northeast China. Rainfall totals exceeded 200 mm (7.9 in) in Rizhao, Tianjin, Chengde, and Qinhuangdao, with a peak accumulation of 324 mm (12.8 in) recorded in Qinglong County. The heavy rains caused water levels along 17 tributaries of the Songhua River to rise up to 2.01 m (6.59 ft) above the ordinary high water mark. Flooding along the Hulan River reached an all-time high; the Chaohe River recorded its largest floods since 1998. Throughout the country, Ampil affected 2.334 million people, killing one person in Shandong with a fallen tree and causing direct economic losses of ¥1.63 billion (US$246 million). According to statistics from the National Disaster Reduction Center, about 169,200 hectares (418,000 acres) of cropland were damaged, of which 6,300 hectares (16,000 acres) were completely lost. Approximately 500 houses collapsed and another 6,700 were damaged, while roughly 1,000 people required emergency assistance.

== See also ==
- Weather of 2018
- Tropical cyclones in 2018
- Typhoon Matsa (2005)
- Typhoon Chan-hom (2015)
- Tropical Storm Yagi (2018)
- Typhoon Muifa (2022)
- Typhoon Bebinca (2024)
