= Timeline of the 2024 Pacific typhoon season =

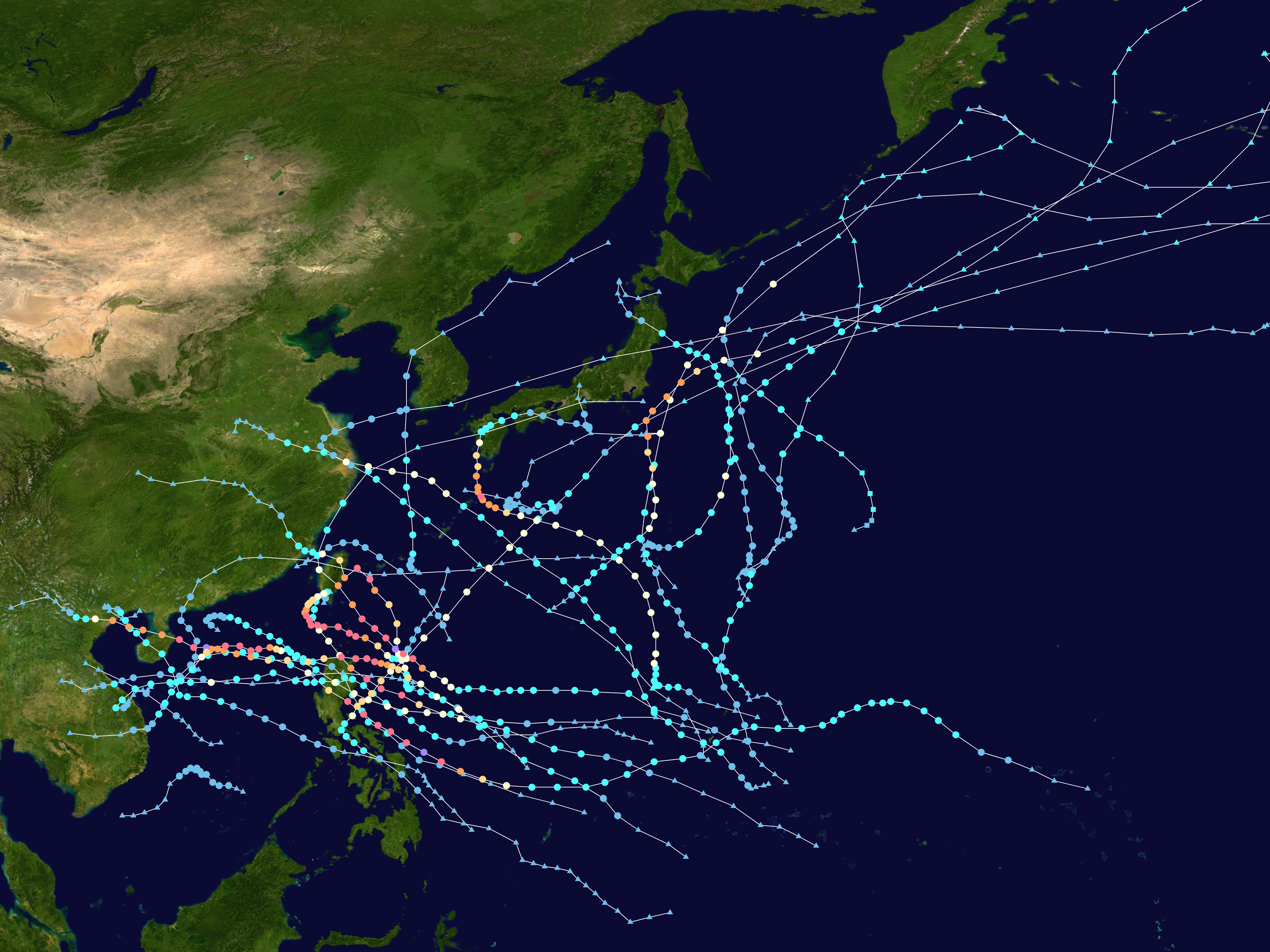
- Season summary map

Season boundaries
- First system formed: May 23, 2024
- Last system dissipated: December 25, 2024

Strongest system
- Name: Yagi
- Maximum winds: 195 km/h (120 mph) (10-minute sustained)
- Lowest pressure: 915 hPa (mbar)

Longest lasting system
- Name: Shanshan and Man-yi
- Duration: 12.5 days
Storm articles
- Typhoon Ewiniar (2024)
- Typhoon Gaemi
- Tropical Storm Prapiroon (2024)
- Tropical Storm Maria (2024)
- Typhoon Ampil (2024)
- Typhoon Shanshan (2024)
- Typhoon Yagi
- Tropical Depression Hone
- Typhoon Bebinca (2024)
- Tropical Storm Pulasan
- Tropical Storm Soulik (2024)
- Typhoon Krathon
- Tropical Storm Trami
- Typhoon Kong-rey (2024)
- Typhoon Yinxing
- Typhoon Man-yi (2024)
- Typhoon Toraji (2024)
- Typhoon Usagi (2024)
- Tropical Storm Pabuk (2024)

This timeline documents all of the events of the 2024 Pacific typhoon season. This season was a slightly above-average tropical cyclone season in terms of named storms, typhoons, and super typhoons (Note: Super typhoons are an unofficial classification given by the Joint Typhoon Warning Center for storms whose strength are 130 knots (240 km/h; 150 mph) or above.) but was below-average in terms of accumulated cyclone energy (ACE). Additionally, it was the fifth-latest Pacific typhoon season on record, with its first storm forming on May 23, the deadliest since 2013 with at least 1,336 fatalities, and the fourth-costliest on record following behind 2018, 2023, and 2019. The season also featured an unusually active November since 2019, with 4 tropical cyclones simultaneously active and the most retired names in a single season—nine. Additionally, the Philippines also saw multiple consecutive typhoons making direct landfalls since 2006, with some at higher intensities. The season's first named storm, Ewiniar, developed on May 25 and eventually intensified into the first typhoon of the season, while the last named storm, Pabuk, dissipated on December 25.

The season ran throughout the year, though most tropical cyclones formed between May and November. The scope of this article is limited to the Pacific Ocean, north of the equator between 100°E and the International Date Line. Tropical storms that form in the entire Western Pacific basin are assigned a name by the Japan Meteorological Agency (JMA). Tropical depressions that form in this basin are given a number with a "W" suffix by the United States' Joint Typhoon Warning Center (JTWC). In addition, the Philippine Atmospheric, Geophysical and Astronomical Services Administration (PAGASA) assigns names to tropical cyclones (including tropical depressions) that enter or form in the Philippine Area of Responsibility (PAR). These names, however, are not in common use outside of the Philippines.

During the season, 37 systems were designated as tropical depressions by either the JMA, PAGASA, JTWC, or other National Meteorological and Hydrological Services such as the China Meteorological Administration (CMA) and the Hong Kong Observatory (HKO). 26 of these tropical depressions became named storms and 12 of these named storms intensified to typhoons. Furthermore, 7 of those strengthened further to super-typhoons.

== Timeline ==
=== January ===
January 1

- 00:00 UTC – The 2024 Pacific typhoon season officially begins, though no tropical cyclones have formed until May.

=== May ===
May 23

- 12:00 UTC (20:00 PHT) at 7.6°N 130.4°E – The PAGASA starts to track a tropical depression, naming it Aghon east of Mindanao.
- 18:00 UTC at 8.3°N 129.6°E – The JMA starts tracking Aghon with a central pressure of 1,004 hPa (1,004 mbar; 29.65 inHg).

May 24

- 06:00 UTC at 9.4°N 127.5°E – The JMA assesses Tropical Depression Aghon's central pressure fluctuates back to 1,004 hPa (1,004 mbar; 29.65 inHg).
- 12:00 UTC at 10.4°N 126.1°E – The JTWC designates Aghon as 01W as it approaches Eastern Visayas.
- 16:20 UTC (00:20 PHT, May 25) at 11.0°N 125.6°E – Tropical Depression 01W (Aghon) makes its first landfall at Manicani Island, Guiuan, Eastern Samar.
- 17:00 UTC (01:00 PHT, May 25) at 11.1°N 125.4°E – Tropical Depression 01W (Aghon) makes its second landfall at Giporlos, Eastern Samar.
- 18:00 UTC at 11.3°N 125.3°E – The JMA assesses 01W (Aghon)'s central pressure fluctuates back to 1,004 hPa (1,004 mbar; 29.65 inHg) as it traverses Samar.
- 20:00 UTC (04:00 PHT, May 25) at 11.7°N 124.9°E – Tropical Depression 01W (Aghon) makes its third landfall at Basiao Island, Catbalogan, Samar.
- 21:00 UTC (05:00 PHT, May 25) at 11.8°N 124.8°E – Tropical Depression 01W (Aghon) makes its fourth landfall at Canduyong Island, Catbalogan, Samar.

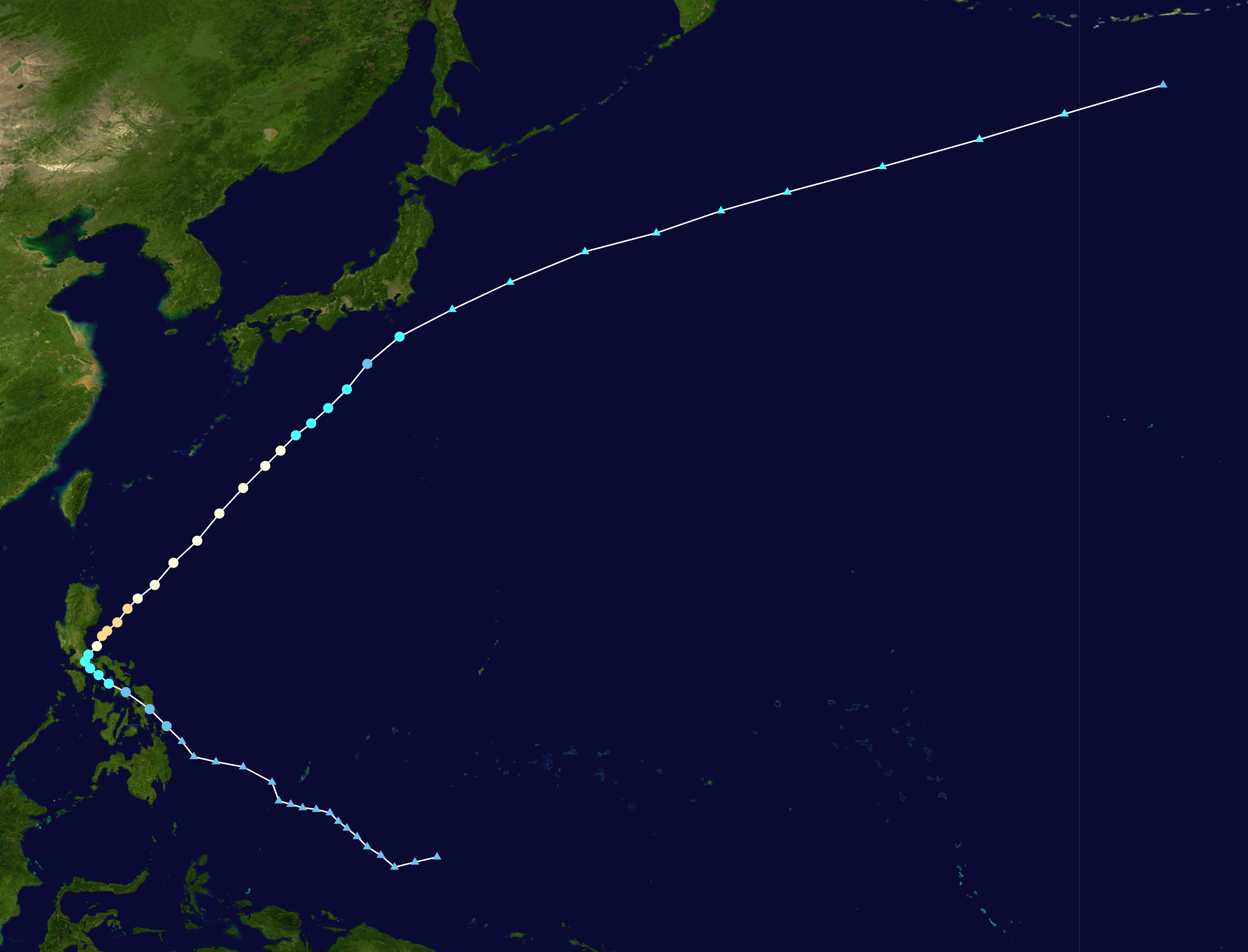
Track of Ewiniar during late May.

May 25

- 00:00 UTC at 12.3°N 123.8°E – The JTWC assesses 01W (Aghon) deepens to 996 hPa (996.0 mbar; 29.41 inHg) before briefly rising as it traverses the Samar Sea.
- 01:00 UTC (09:00 PHT) at 12.3°N 123.7°E – Tropical Depression 01W (Aghon) makes its fifth landfall at Mobo, Masbate.
- 06:00 UTC at 12.7°N 122.8°E – The JTWC upgrades 01W (Aghon) to a tropical storm after emerging over the Sibuyan Sea.
- 12:00 UTC (20:00 PHT) at 13.4°N 122.3°E – The JMA and PAGASA upgrade 01W (Aghon) to a tropical storm, naming it Ewiniar while traversing the northern reaches of Sibuyan Sea.
- 15:10 UTC (23:10 PHT) at 13.3°N 122.1°E – Tropical Storm Ewiniar (Aghon) makes its sixth hit at Torrijos, Marinduque.
- 20:30 UTC (04:30 PHT, May 26) at 13.93°N 121.62°E – After crossing Tayabas Bay, Tropical Storm Ewiniar (Aghon) makes its seventh landfall at Lucena City, Quezon.

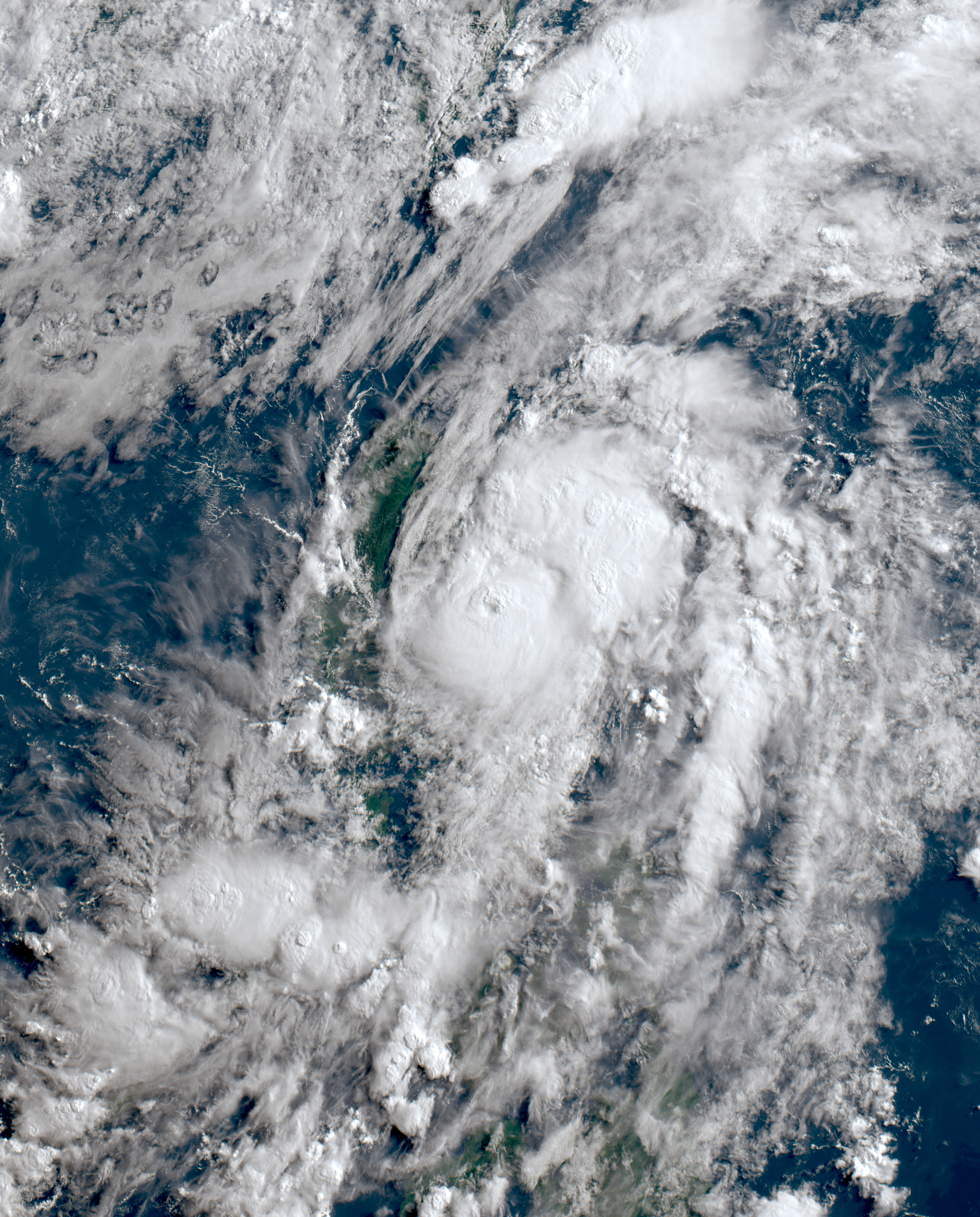
Ewiniar at its peak intensity moving away from the Philippines on May 26.

May 26

- 00:00 UTC (08:00 PHT) at 14.1°N 121.4°E – The JMA and PAGASA upgrade Tropical Storm Ewiniar (Aghon) into a severe tropical storm as it turns to the northeast.
- 06:00 UTC (14:00 PHT) at 14.3°N 121.7°E – The PAGASA further upgrades Ewiniar (Aghon) to a typhoon while emerging over Lamon Bay.
- 10:50 UTC (18:50 PHT) at 14.8°N 122.2°E – Ewiniar (Aghon) makes its eighth landfall at Patnanungan, Quezon.
- 11:30 UTC (19:30 PHT) at 14.9°N 122.2°E – Ewiniar (Aghon) makes its ninth landfall at Pandanan Island, Burdeos, Quezon.
- 12:00 UTC (20:00 PHT) at 14.9°N 122.2°E – The JMA and JTWC upgrade Ewiniar (Aghon) to a typhoon and a Category 1 typhoon, respectively, as it makes its final landfall at Usuk Island, Burdeos, Quezon.
- 15:00 UTC (23:00 PHT) – The PAGASA reports Typhoon Ewiniar (Aghon) has reached its peak intensity with 10-minute sustained winds of 75 knots (139 km/h; 86 mph) and a central pressure of 965 hPa (965.0 mbar; 28.50 inHg).
- 18:00 UTC at 15.5°N 122.5°E – Typhoon Ewiniar (Aghon) intensifies further into a Category 2 typhoon.
- 21:00 UTC at 15.7°N 122.7°E – The JTWC reports Typhoon Ewiniar (Aghon) reached its peak intensity with 1-minute sustained winds of 90 knots (170 km/h; 100 mph) and a central pressure of 961 hPa (961.0 mbar; 28.38 inHg).

May 27

- 00:00 UTC at 15.8°N 122.8°E – The JMA assesses Ewiniar (Aghon) is at its peak with 10-minute sustained winds of 75 knots (139 km/h; 86 mph) and a minimum pressure of 970 hPa (970.0 mbar; 28.64 inHg) as it starts to accelerate northeastward.
- 18:00 UTC at 17.8°N 124.6°E – Typhoon Ewiniar (Aghon) weakens to a Category 1 typhoon.

May 28

- 18:00 UTC at 22.8°N 129.3°E – The JTWC reports Typhoon Ewiniar (Aghon) has reached a secondary peak as a high-end Category 1 typhoon with 1-minute sustained winds of 80 knots (150 km/h; 92 mph) and a central pressure of 973 hPa (973.0 mbar; 28.73 inHg) as it moves northeastward over the Philippine Sea.

May 29

- 00:00 UTC at 24.3°N 130.9°E – The JMA reports Typhoon Ewiniar (Aghon) had weakened into a severe tropical storm.
- 04:00 UTC (12:00 PHT) – The PAGASA reports Ewiniar (Aghon) has exited the PAR.
- 12:00 UTC at 26.3°N 132.9°E – The JTWC reports Typhoon Ewiniar has briefly re-strengthened with 1-minute sustained winds of 70 knots (130 km/h; 81 mph) and a central pressure of 978 hPa (978.0 mbar; 28.88 inHg) east of Okinawa.
- 18:00 UTC at 27.4°N 133.8°E – The JTWC downgrades Ewiniar to a tropical storm as it moves south of Japan.

May 30

- 00:00 UTC
  - At 28.0°N 134.7°E – The JMA further downgrades Ewiniar to a tropical storm.
  - At 18.0°N 111.9°E – The JMA marks a tropical depression over the South China Sea.
- 12:00 UTC at 17.3°N 112.5°E – The tropical depression in the South China Sea is designated 02W by the JTWC.
- 18:00 UTC
  - At 31.4°N 137.7°E – The JMA assesses Ewiniar has transitioned to an extratropical low.
  - At 31.4°N 138.1°E – The JTWC further downgrades Ewiniar to a tropical depression.

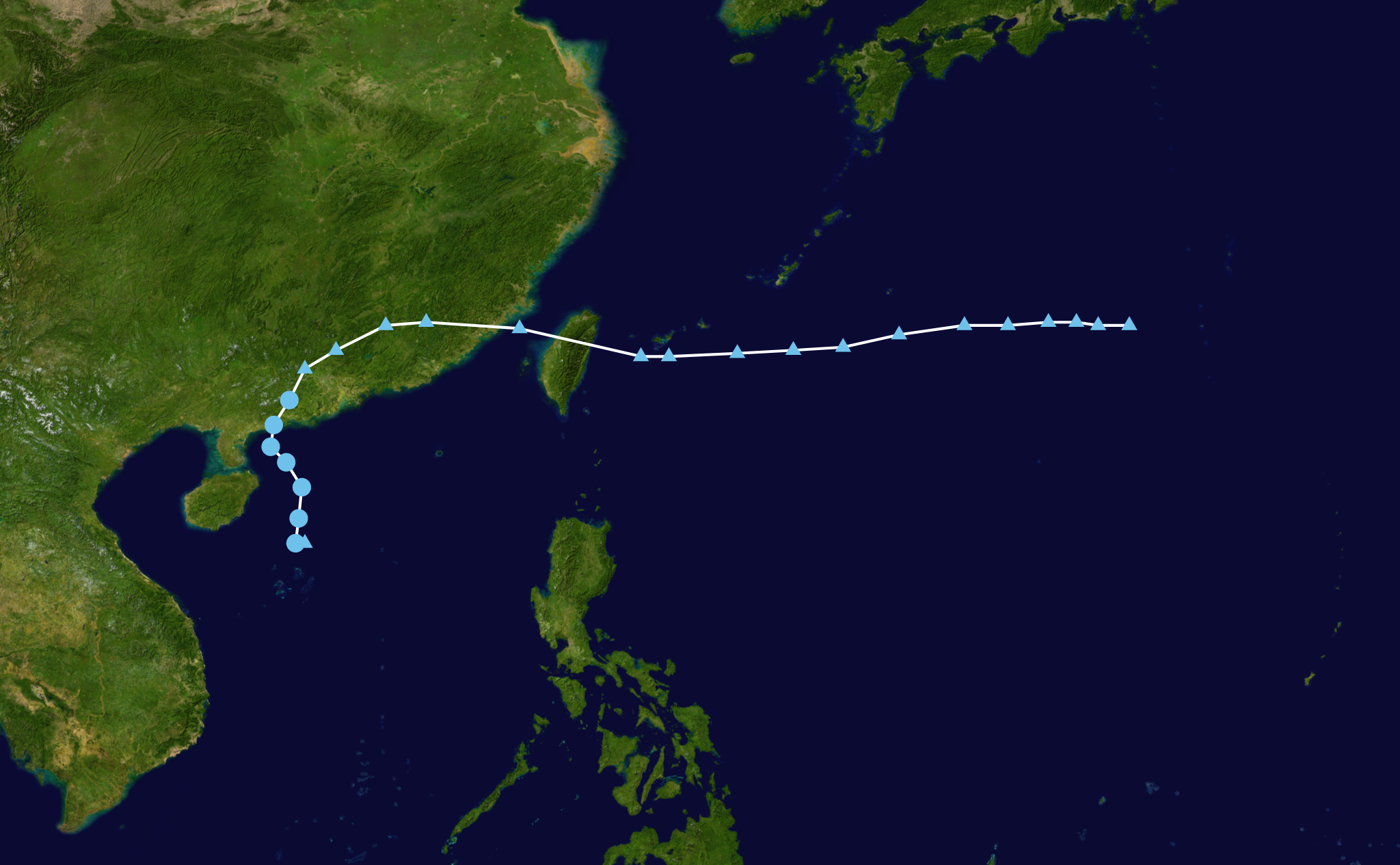
Track of Maliksi during late May to early June.

May 31

- 00:00 UTC
  - At 33.2°N 140.1°E – The JTWC reports Ewiniar has re-strengthened back to tropical storm status with 1-minute sustained winds of 35 knots (65 km/h; 40 mph) and a central pressure of 998 hPa (998.0 mbar; 29.47 inHg) as interacted with the baroclinic zones.
  - At 19.8°N 112.6°E – The JMA upgrades 02W into Tropical Storm Maliksi, subsequently peaking with 10-minute sustained winds of 35 knots (65 km/h; 40 mph) and a central pressure of 998 hPa (998.0 mbar; 29.47 inHg).
  - At 19.8°N 112.8°E – The JTWC assesses Maliksi having reached its peak 1-minute winds as a high-end tropical depression of 30 knots (56 km/h; 35 mph) as it moves northward towards China.
- 06:00 UTC at 34.6°N 143.2°E – The JTWC reports Ewiniar has turned into an extratropical cyclone near Japan.
- 12:00 UTC at 21.2°N 111.3°E – The JMA reports Maliksi had weakened to a tropical depression as it was about to make landfall.
- 16:55 UTC (00:55 CST, June 1) at 21.9°N 112.0°E – Maliksi makes landfall on Yangjiang, Guangdong.
- 18:00 UTC at 21.5°N 111.4°E – The JTWC reports Maliksi attained its lowest pressure at 990 hPa (990.0 mbar; 29.23 inHg) after making landfall.

=== June ===
June 1

- 06:00 UTC at 23.4°N 112.9°E – The JTWC downgrades Maliksi further to a tropical disturbance as it moves northeastward over China.

June 2

- 00:00 UTC at 24.9°N 116.4°E – Maliksi becomes extratropical as it accelerates towards the east.
- 12:00 UTC at 47.9°N 175.1°W – The JMA last notes the extratropical remnants of Ewiniar as it moved past the International Date Line (IDL).

June 5

- 06:00 UTC at 24.8°N 139.0°E – After crossing Taiwan and emerging over the Philippine Sea, the JMA last notes the extratropical remnants of Maliksi west of the Ogasawara Islands; the system dissipates six hours later.

=== July ===
July 13

- 06:00 UTC at 14.0°N 112.7°E – The JMA marks a tropical depression over the South China Sea.
- 18:00 UTC at 14.0°N 112.0°E – The JMA assesses the tropical depression over the South China Sea attained a minimum pressure of 1,000 hPa (1,000 mbar; 29.53 inHg).

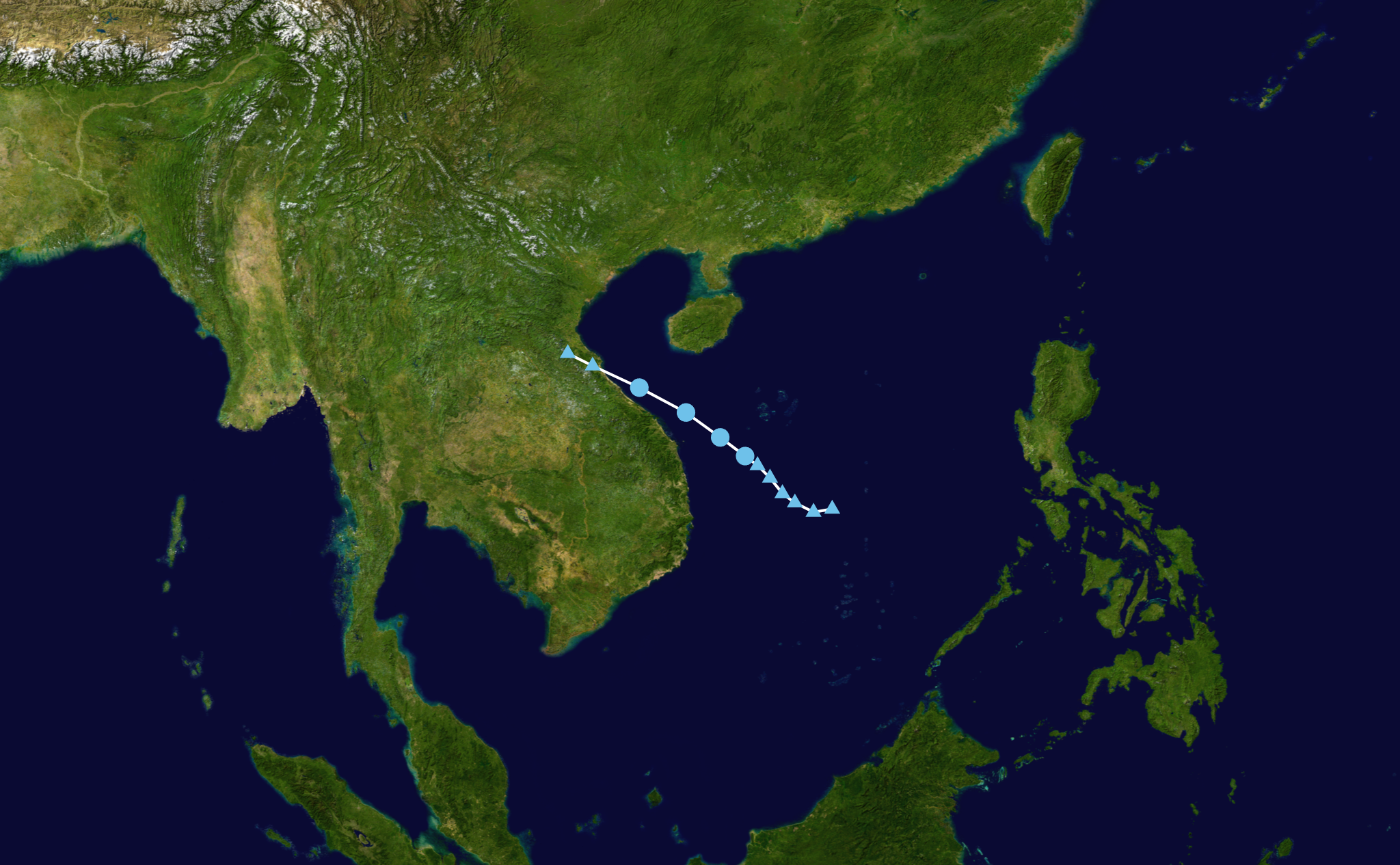
Track of 03W during mid July.

July 14

- 06:00 UTC at 14.7°N 111.5°E – The JMA reports the tropical depression over the South China Sea attained 10-minute sustained winds of 30 knots (56 km/h; 35 mph) and re-attains a minimum pressure of 1,000 hPa (1,000 mbar; 29.53 inHg).
- 12:00 UTC at 14.9°N 111.3°E – The JTWC begins tracking the tropical depression over the South China Sea, designating it 03W with 1-minute sustained winds of 25 knots (46 km/h; 29 mph).

July 15

- 00:00 UTC at 16.2°N 109.2°E – The JTWC assesses 03W has deepened to a central pressure of 997 hPa (997.0 mbar; 29.44 inHg) as it nears Vietnam.
- 06:00 UTC at 17.2°N 107.4°E – The JMA assesses 03W slightly deepened back to a minimum pressure of 1,000 hPa (1,000 mbar; 29.53 inHg).
- Between 06:00-12:00 UTC (13:00-19:00 ICT) – 03W makes landfall on Quảng Trị province.
- 12:00 UTC at 17.8°N 106.2°E – The JTWC reports 03W has weakened to a tropical disturbance over Tuyên Hóa, Quảng Trị.

July 16

- 00:00 UTC – The JMA downgrades Ex-03W further to a low-pressure area while moving further inland.

July 18

- 12:00 UTC at 12.8°N 121.0°E – The JTWC begins tracking a tropical depression over Mindoro Island with 1-minute sustained winds of 25 knots (46 km/h; 29 mph), designating it 04W.
- 18:00 UTC (02:00 PHT, July 19) at 13.3°N 120.0°E – The PAGASA recognizes 04W and gives it a domestic name, Butchoy, now over the Mindoro Strait.

July 19

- 00:00 UTC
  - At 11.4°N 133.1°E – The JMA reports the formation of a tropical depression in the Philippine Sea with a central pressure of 1,004 hPa (1,004 mbar; 29.65 inHg).
  - At 13.5°N 119.1°E – The JTWC assesses 04W (Butchoy) has deepened to a central pressure of 999 hPa (999.0 mbar; 29.50 inHg) while moving west-northwestwards.
- 06:00 UTC at 14.1°N 117.8°E – The JTWC downgrades 04W (Butchoy) back to a tropical disturbance.
- 12:00 UTC (20:00 PHT) at 13.2°N 131.6°E – The PAGASA starts to track the tropical depression over the Philippine Sea, designating it Carina.
- 18:00 UTC
  - (02:00 PHT, July 20) at 15.0°N 115.8°E – The JTWC re-upgrades Butchoy back to tropical depression status. At the same time, the PAGASA assesses the system has 10-minute winds of 30 knots (56 km/h; 35 mph) and a central pressure of 1,000 hPa (1,000 mbar; 29.53 inHg) which would be its peak intensity inside the agency's PAR.
  - At 14.7°N 129.7°E – The JTWC also begins tracking Carina, designating it as 05W.
- 23:00 UTC (07:00 PHT) – The PAGASA reports 04W (Butchoy) has exited the PAR.

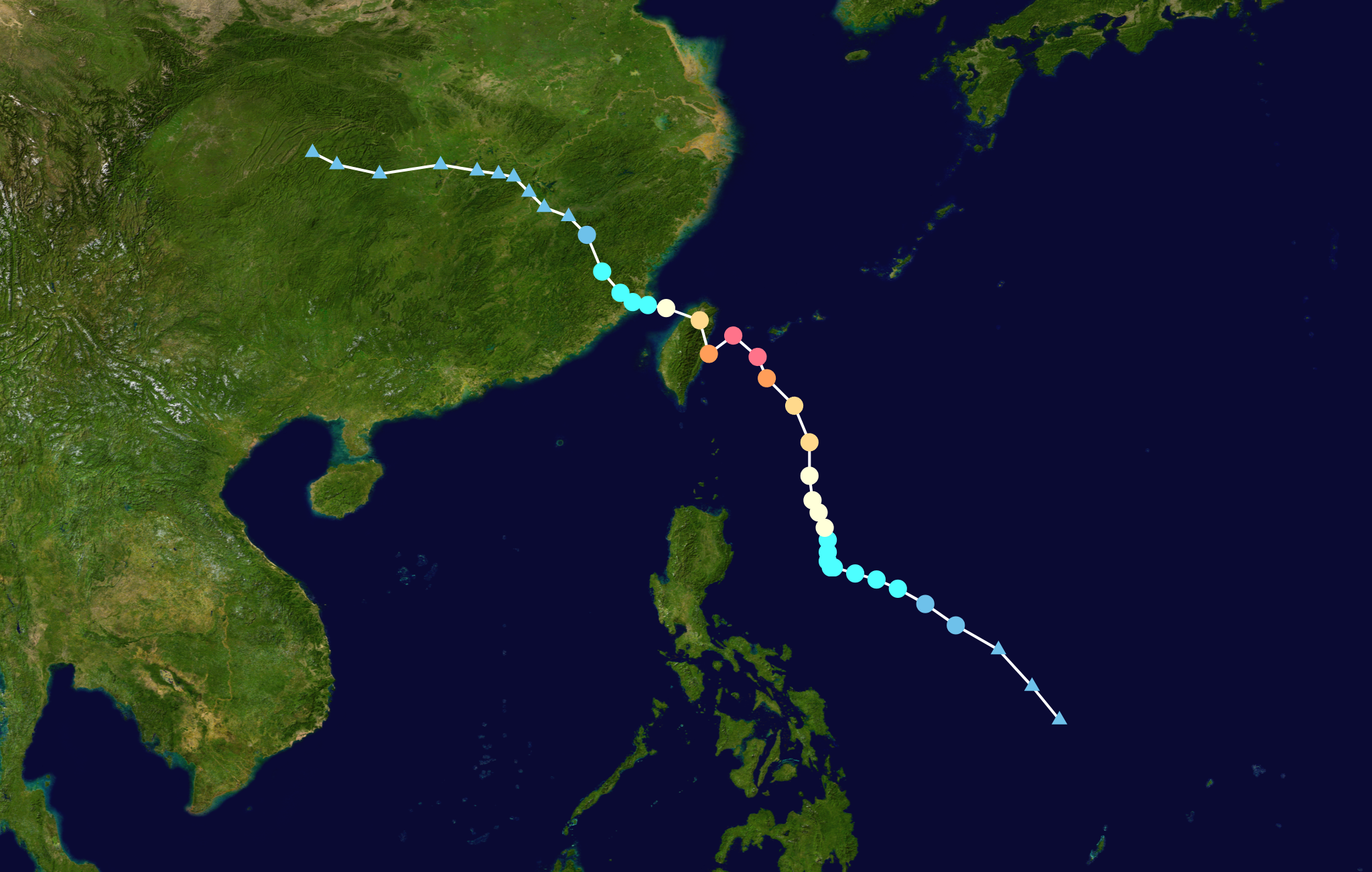
Track of Gaemi during late July.

July 20

- 00:00 UTC
  - At 15.5°N 128.5°E – The JMA upgrades 05W (Carina) into a tropical storm, naming it Gaemi.
  - At 14.6°N 115.6°E – The JMA starts tracking on 04W.
- 06:00 UTC
  - At 15.9°N 113.8°E – The JTWC upgrades 04W into a tropical storm as it moves over the South China Sea.
  - At 16.1°N 128.2°E – The JTWC also upgrades Gaemi (Carina) to a tropical storm, deepening to a central pressure of 995 hPa (995.0 mbar; 29.38 inHg) before briefly rising.
  - (14:00 PHT) at 16.2°N 127.5°E – PAGASA follows suit and upgrades Gaemi (Carina) into a tropical storm.

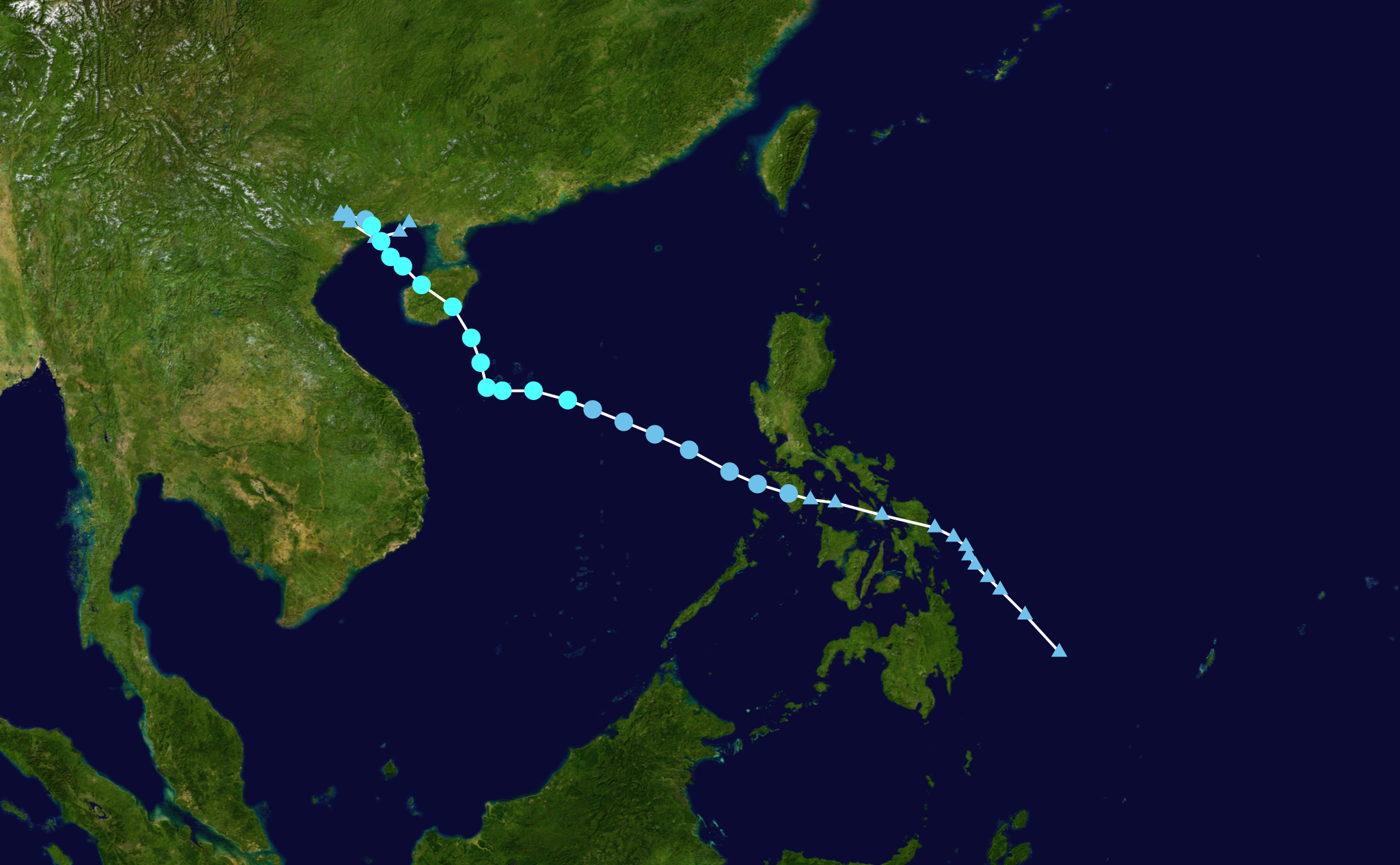
Track of Prapiroon during mid-late July.

July 21

- 00:00 UTC at 16.0°N 111.3°E – The JMA upgrades 04W into a tropical storm, naming it Prapiroon as it turned towards Hainan.
- 06:00 UTC (14:00 PHT) at 16.4°N 125.6°E – Gaemi (Carina) further intensifies into a severe tropical storm east of Luzon, per the JMA and PAGASA, as the system turns to the north.
- 17:30 UTC (01:30 CST, July 22) at 18.8°N 110.4°E – Tropical Storm Prapiroon makes landfall on Wanning, Hainan.
- 18:00 UTC at 18.9°N 110.3°E – The JTWC assesses Prapiroon has attained 1-minute sustained winds of 40 knots (74 km/h; 46 mph) shortly after its landfall.

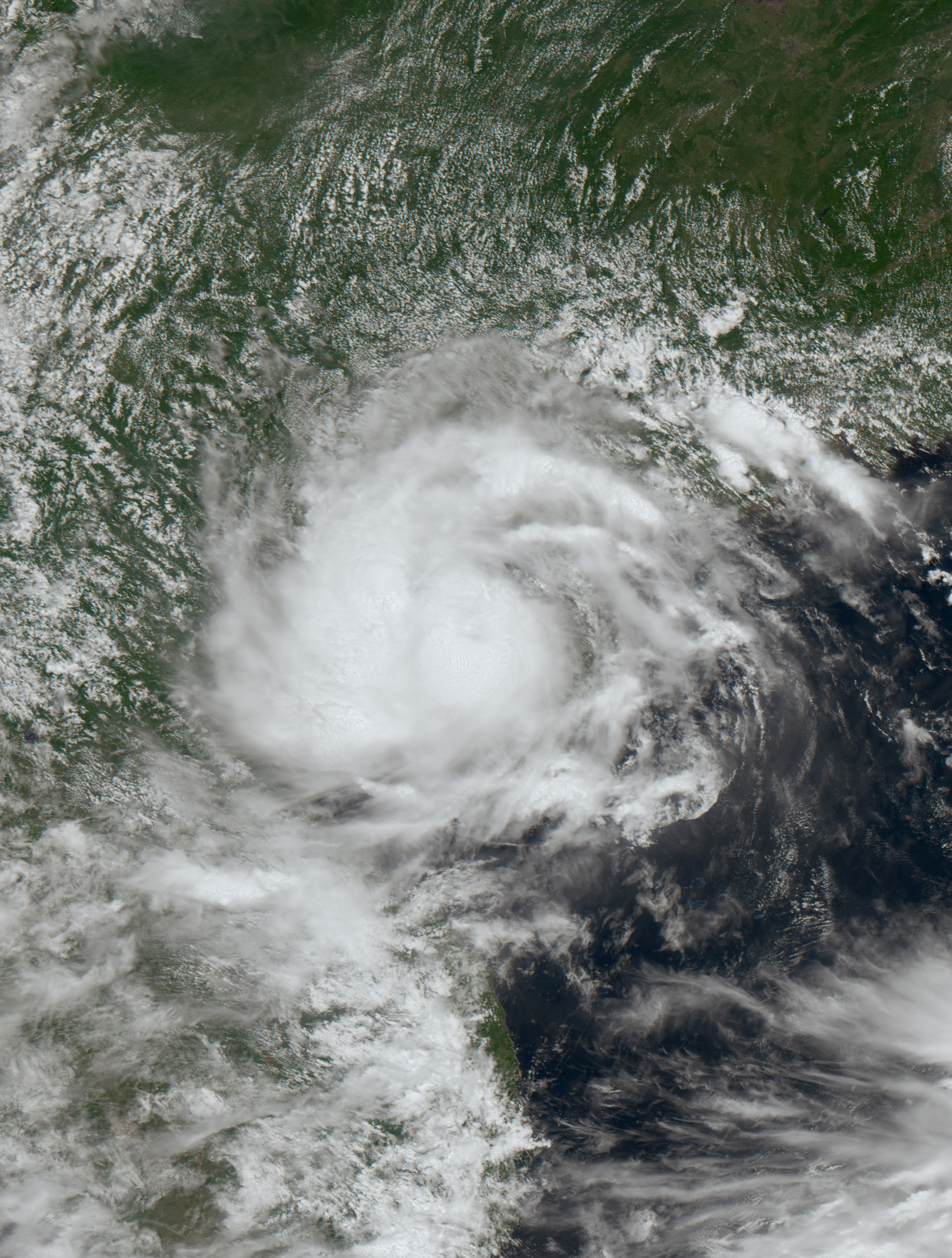
Prapiroon over the Gulf of Tonkin hours before landfall on Vietnam on July 24.

July 22

- 00:00 UTC
  - At 19.5°N 109.2°E – The JMA upgrades Prapiroon to a severe tropical storm as it is about to emerge over the Gulf of Tonkin.
  - At 17.2°N 125.5°E – The JMA further upgrades Gaemi (Carina) into a typhoon.
- 06:00 UTC
  - At 20.1°N 108.5°E – The JMA assesses Severe Tropical Storm Prapiroon attained 10-minute sustained winds of 55 knots (102 km/h; 63 mph) and a minimum pressure of 985 hPa (985.0 mbar; 29.09 inHg).
  - At 17.9°N 125.4°E – The JTWC upgrades Gaemi (Carina) to a Category 1 typhoon as it slowly moves northwards, deepening to a central pressure of 980 hPa (980.0 mbar; 28.94 inHg) before briefly rising again.
- 12:00 UTC
  - At 20.3°N 108.3°E – The JTWC assesses Prapiroon had reached 1-minute sustained winds of 60 knots (110 km/h; 69 mph) and a central pressure of 981 hPa (981.0 mbar; 28.97 inHg) while slowly moving northwestwards towards Vietnam.
  - (20:00 PHT) at 18.2°N 125.4°E – The PAGASA assesses Gaemi (Carina) has reached typhoon status.
- 23:30 UTC (06:30 ICT, July 23) at 21.3°N 107.3°E – Severe Tropical Storm Prapiroon makes another landfall over Quảng Ninh province.

July 23

- 00:00 UTC at 21.5°N 107.5°E – The JMA downgrades Prapiroon to a tropical storm upon making landfall on Vietnam.
- 06:00 UTC
  - At 20.8°N 125.1°E – Typhoon Gaemi (Carina) further intensifies to a Category 2 typhoon, per the JTWC, as the system starts to turn towards Taiwan.
  - At 21.6°N 107.4°E – The JTWC downgrades Prapiroon to a tropical depression as it moves further inland.
- 12:00 UTC
  - At 21.5°N 106.7°E – The JMA reports Prapiroon has further weakened to a tropical depression.
  - At 21.8°N 107.2°E – The JTWC further downgrades Prapiroon to a tropical disturbance.

Infrared satellite loop of Gaemi making a counter-clockwise loop near the coast of Taiwan on July 24.

July 24

- 00:00 UTC at 23.5°N 123.3°E – Typhoon Gaemi (Carina) rapidly intensifies to a Category 4 typhoon as it approaches Taiwan.
- 03:00 UTC at 23.9°N 122.9°E – The JMA assesses Gaemi (Carina) has attained its peak intensity with 10-minute sustained winds of 90 knots (170 km/h; 100 mph) and a minimum pressure of 935 hPa (935.0 mbar; 27.61 inHg).
- 06:00 UTC
  - At 24.2°N 122.4°E – The JTWC assesses Gaemi (Carina) having 1-minute sustained winds of 125 knots (232 km/h; 144 mph) and a central pressure of 919 hPa (919.0 mbar; 27.14 inHg).
  - (14:00 PHT) at 24.2°N 122.5°E – The PAGASA further upgrades Gaemi (Carina) to super-typhoon strength, subsequently peaking with 10-minute sustained winds of 100 knots (190 km/h; 120 mph) and a central pressure of 920 hPa (920.0 mbar; 27.17 inHg).
- 12:00 UTC
  - At 23.7°N 121.6°E – The JTWC reports Typhoon Gaemi (Carina) has weakened to a high-end Category 3 typhoon just off the coast of Taiwan.
  - (20:00 PHT) at 23.5°N 121.6°E – The PAGASA downgrades Gaemi (Carina) back to typhoon status.
- 15:00 UTC at 24.1°N 121.8°E – After making a tight counter-clockwise loop, Gaemi (Carina) weakens to a severe tropical storm, per the JMA, as it moves northward along the coast.
- 16:00 UTC (00:00 TST, July 25) at 24.5°N 121.8°E – Gaemi (Carina) makes landfall at Nan’ao Township, Yilan County.
- 18:00 UTC
  - At 20.8°N 107.4°E – The JMA last notes Tropical Depression Prapiroon as it emerges over the Gulf of Tonkin after moving in a counter-clockwise direction; the system dissipates six hours later.
  - At 24.5°N 121.4°E – Typhoon Gaemi (Carina) further weakens to a Category 2 typhoon as it crosses Taiwan.
- 22:20 UTC (06:20 PHT) – The PAGASA reports Gaemi (Carina) has exited the PAR as it emerges over the Taiwan Strait.

July 25

- 00:00 UTC at 25.2°N 120.3°E – The JTWC downgrades Gaemi into a Category 1 typhoon as it heads towards China.
- 06:00 UTC at 25.3°N 119.6°E – The JTWC further downgrades Gaemi into a tropical storm.
- 11:50 UTC (19:50 CST) at 25.3°N 119.1°E – Gaemi makes its second and final hit at Xiuyu, Putian, Fujian.
- 18:00 UTC at 25.7°N 118.9°E – The JMA downgrades Gaemi to a tropical storm as it moved inland.

July 26

- 06:00 UTC at 27.6°N 117.3°E – The JTWC reports Gaemi has further weakened into a tropical depression.
- 12:00 UTC at 28.2°N 117.2°E – The JTWC further downgrades Gaemi into a tropical disturbance over Jiangxi Province.
- 18:00 UTC at 27.9°N 115.9°E – The JMA downgrades Gaemi to a tropical depression as it further weakens while moving west-northwestward inland.

July 28

- 06:00 UTC at 29.5°N 110.9°E – The JMA assesses Gaemi has slightly deepened to a central pressure of 1,000 hPa (1,000 mbar; 29.53 inHg) over Central China.
- 18:00 UTC at 30.2°N 108.7°E – The JMA last notes Gaemi as it further moved inland; the system dissipates six hours later over Hubei Province.

=== August ===
August 4

- 00:00 UTC at 24.0°N 134.9°E – The JMA marks a tropical depression over the Philippine Sea east of the Ryukyu Islands with a central pressure of 1,002 hPa (1,002 mbar; 29.59 inHg).

August 5

- 06:00 UTC at 24.0°N 140.8°E – The JMA begins tracking a tropical depression near the Ogasawara Islands.
- 18:00 UTC at 24.4°N 140.1°E – The JMA assesses the tropical depression near the Ogasawara Islands has slightly deepened to a central pressure of 1,002 hPa (1,002 mbar; 29.59 inHg) as the system recurves to the northeast.

August 6

- 18:00 UTC at 25.6°N 140.8°E – The JTWC designates the tropical depression near the Ogasawaras as 06W.

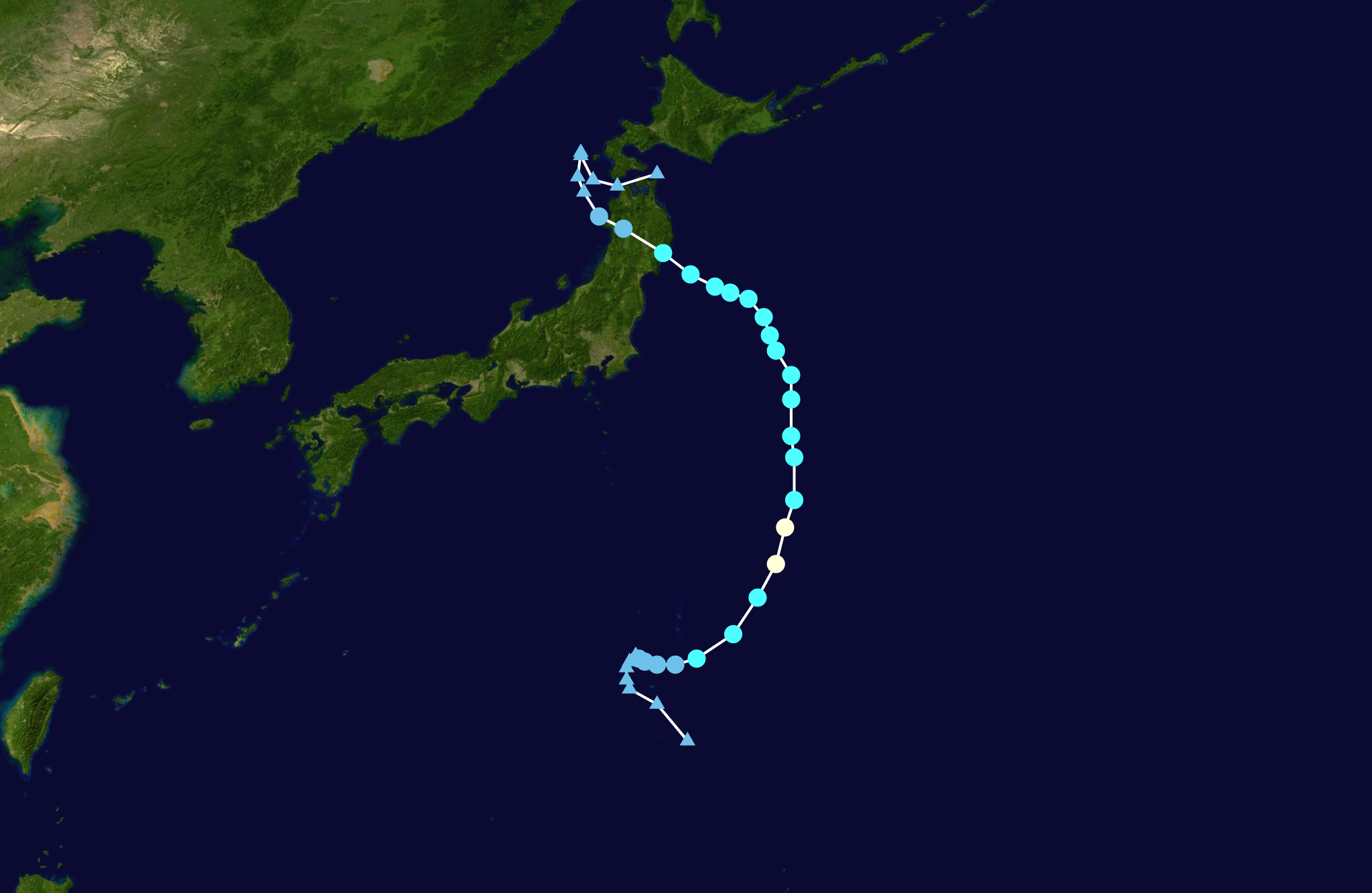
Track of Maria during early-mid August.

August 7

- 18:00 UTC
  - At 25.7°N 142.7°E – The JMA upgrades 06W to a tropical storm, naming it Maria, while moving northeastward.
  - At 25.5°N 142.8°E – The JTWC follows suit, upgrading Maria into a tropical storm with the system slightly deepening to a central pressure of 979 hPa (979.0 mbar; 28.91 inHg).

August 8

- 00:00 UTC at 23.6°N 128.0°E – After days of meandering near the Ryukyus, the JMA last notes the tropical depression over the Philippine Sea with the system dissipating six hours later.
- 12:00 UTC
  - At 28.7°N 145.3°E – Tropical Storm Maria intensifies to a severe tropical storm, per the JMA, as the system moved generally northward.
  - At 28.8°N 145.3°E – The JTWC reports Maria has intensified to a Category 1 typhoon, peaking with 1-minute sustained winds of 70 knots (130 km/h; 81 mph) and a central pressure of 973 hPa (973.0 mbar; 28.73 inHg).
- 18:00 UTC at 29.8°N 145.6°E – The JMA assessed Maria has reached its peak intensity with 10-minute sustained winds of 55 knots (102 km/h; 63 mph) and a minimum pressure of 980 hPa (980.0 mbar; 28.94 inHg).

August 9

- 00:00 UTC at 30.8°N 145.9°E – The JTWC downgrades Maria to a tropical storm as it starts to recurve towards Japan.

August 10

- 00:00 UTC at 35.0°N 146.0°E – The JMA downgrades Maria to a tropical storm as it turns to the northwest.
- 12:00 UTC
  - At 36.5°N 145.2°E – The JMA re-upgrades Maria to a severe tropical storm, attaining a secondary peak with 10-minute winds of 50 knots (93 km/h; 58 mph) and a central pressure of 980 hPa (980.0 mbar; 28.94 inHg).
  - At 26.5°N 154.1°E – A tropical depression forms to the north of Minamitorishima Island.
  - At 23.0°N 131.5°E – Another tropical depression forms over the Philippine Sea southeast of the Ryukyu Islands.
- 18:00 UTC
  - At 23.0°N 132.0°E – The tropical depression southeast of the Ryukyu Islands deepens to a central pressure of 1,000 hPa (1,000 mbar; 29.53 inHg). per the JMA.
  - At 36.9°N 145.0°E – The JTWC assesses Maria briefly re-strengthened with 1-minute winds of 50 knots (93 km/h; 58 mph).

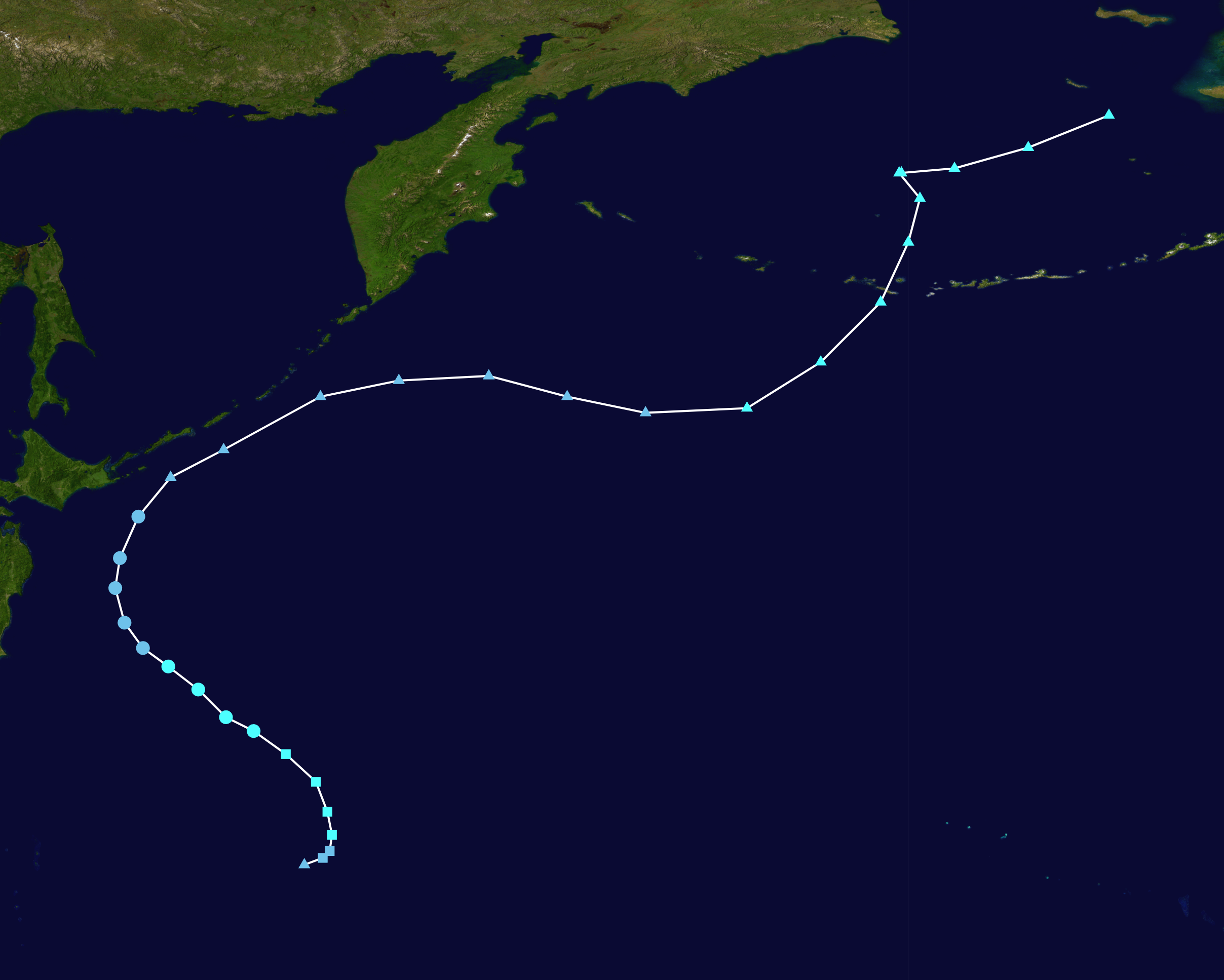
Track of Son-Tinh during mid August.

August 11

- 00:00 UTC at 27.4°N 155.1°E – The tropical depression north of Minamitorishima intensifies to a tropical storm, gaining the name Son-Tinh from the JMA.
- 06:00 UTC at 22.7°N 133.5°E – The JMA reports the tropical depression southeast of the Ryukyu Islands re-attains a central pressure of 1,000 hPa (1,000 mbar; 29.53 inHg).
- 12:00 UTC
  - At 28.8°N 154.5°E – The JMA assesses Son-Tinh has reached its peak intensity with 10-minute sustained winds of 40 knots (74 km/h; 46 mph) and a minimum pressure of 994 hPa (994.0 mbar; 29.35 inHg) as it turns to the northwest.
  - At 37.8°N 143.4°E – The JTWC assesses Maria briefly re-strengthened once again, with 1-minute sustained winds of 50 knots (93 km/h; 58 mph) and a central pressure of 978 hPa (978.0 mbar; 28.88 inHg) as it approaches the Tōhoku region of Japan.
  - At 21.7°N 134.9°E – The JMA marks the formation of a tropical depression southwest of the Ogasawara Islands.
  - At 22.4°N 134.6°E – The JMA last notes the tropical depression southeast of the Ryukyu Islands as it interacts with the tropical depression to its west; the system dissipated six hours later.
- 18:00 UTC at 23.9°N 146.7°E – Another tropical depression forms to the east of the Ogasawaras with a central pressure of 1,002 hPa (1,002 mbar; 29.59 inHg).
- 23:30 UTC (08:30 JST) at 39.1°N 141.7°E – Maria makes landfall at Ōfunato, Iwate Prefecture.

August 12

- 00:00 UTC
  - At 39.0°N 141.7°E – Upon making landfall, the JMA downgrades Maria to a tropical storm as it crosses northern Honshu.
  - At 22.7°N 136.3°E – The JTWC recognizes the tropical depression southwest of the Ogasawaras and designates it as 08W.
- 06:00 UTC
  - At 39.9°N 140.5°E – The JMA further downgrades Maria to a tropical depression as it is about to emerge over the Sea of Japan.
  - At 39.8°N 139.9°E – The JTWC also downgrades Maria to a tropical depression.
  - At 32.4°N 151.6°E – The JTWC reports Son-Tinh has transitioned to a tropical storm after it became subtropical, with 1-minute sustained winds of 40 knots (74 km/h; 46 mph) and a central pressure of 992 hPa (992.0 mbar; 29.29 inHg) while moving northwest towards Japan.
  - At 23.1°N 136.9°E – The JTWC further upgrades 08W into a tropical storm as it moves northeast.
- 12:00 UTC at 23.1°N 136.6°E – The JMA reports 08W has strengthened to a tropical storm, naming it Ampil.
- 18:00 UTC
  - At 26.6°N 149.6°E – The JTWC starts tracking the tropical depression east of the Ogasawaras, designating it as 09W.
  - At 41.0°N 138.8°E – The JTWC reports Maria has further weakened to a tropical disturbance while moving over the Sea of Japan.
  - At 34.3°N 149.3°E – After a brief rise in pressure, the JTWC reports Son-Tinh slightly deepened to a central pressure of 993 hPa (993.0 mbar; 29.32 inHg).

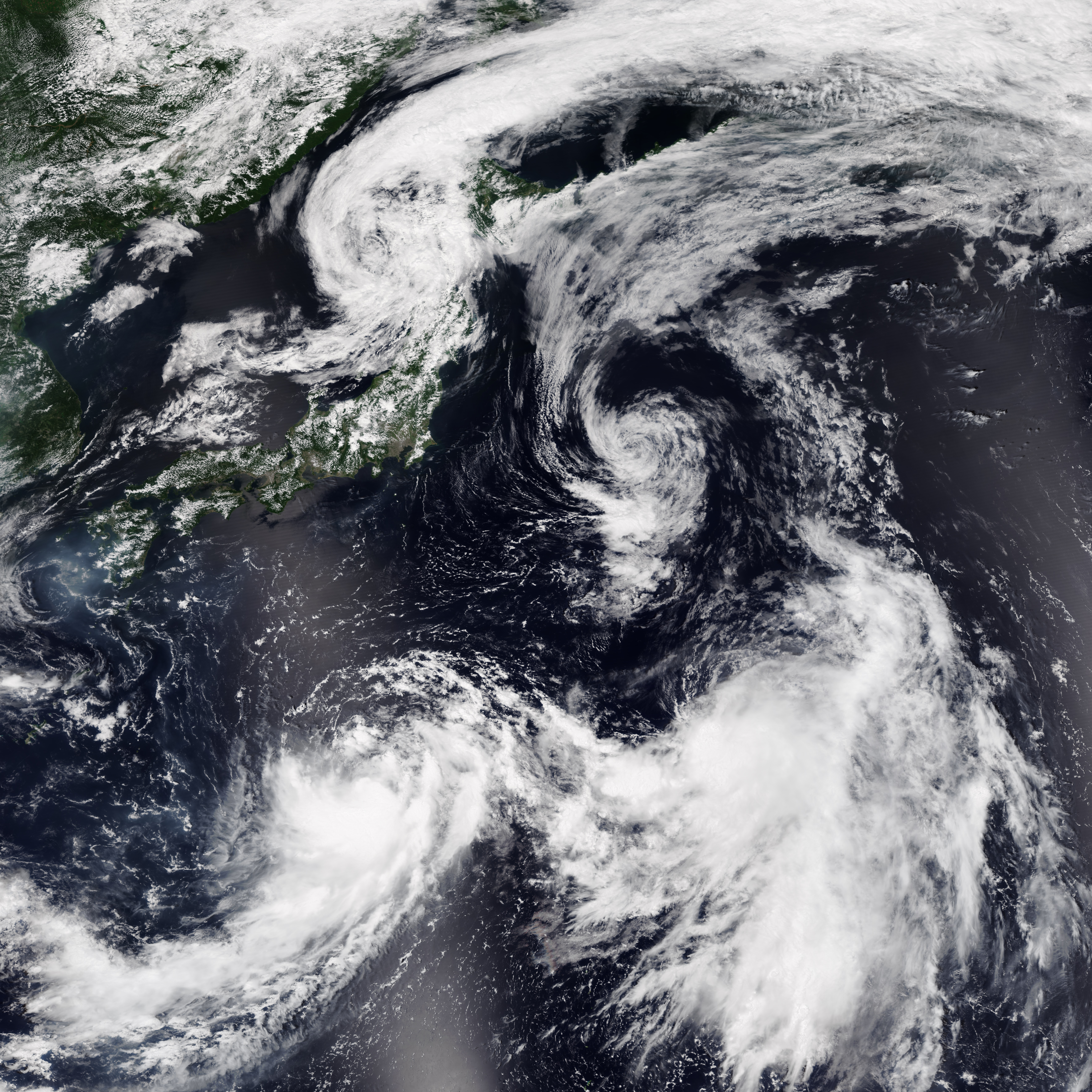
Four systems active on August 13: Tropical Depression Maria (top left); Tropical Storm Ampil (bottom left); Tropical Depression Son-Tinh (center right); and Tropical Storm Wukong (bottom right).

August 13

- 00:00 UTC
  - At 26.4°N 150.1°E – The JMA upgrades 09W to a tropical storm, naming it Wukong, subsequently peaking with 10-minute winds of 35 knots (65 km/h; 40 mph) and a central pressure of 1,002 hPa (1,002 mbar; 29.59 inHg).
  - At 24.4°N 138.1°E – The JTWC assesses Ampil has slightly deepened to a central pressure of 988 hPa (988.0 mbar; 29.18 inHg) before briefly rising.
- 06:00 UTC
  - At 27.4°N 149.4°E – The JTWC analyzes Wukong has peaked as a high-end tropical depression peaking with 1-minute winds of 30 knots (56 km/h; 35 mph) and a central pressure of 984 hPa (984.0 mbar; 29.06 inHg) as it turns to the northwest.
  - At 36.0°N 146.9°E – The JTWC downgrades Son-Tinh to a tropical depression as it starts to recurve.
- 12:00 UTC
  - At 25.3°N 139.0°E – Tropical Storm Ampil intensifies to a severe tropical storm, per the JMA.
  - At 37.0°N 146.0°E – The JMA reports Son-Tinh has weakened to a tropical depression as it makes its closest approach to Japan.
- 18:00 UTC
  - At 28.3°N 149.8°E – The JMA assesses Wukong re-attains a central pressure of 1,002 hPa (1,002 mbar; 29.59 inHg).
  - At 28.4°N 149.0°E – The JTWC reports Wukong has slightly deepened to a central pressure of 985 hPa (985.0 mbar; 29.09 inHg).

August 14

- 00:00 UTC at 39.9°N 145.8°E – The JTWC assesses Son-Tinh has deepened to its lowest central pressure of 983 hPa (983.0 mbar; 29.03 inHg).
- 06:00 UTC
  - At 26.7°N 141.0°E – The JTWC determines Ampil has intensified to a Category 1 typhoon as it turns northward.
  - At 30.5°N 148.2°E – The JTWC reports Wukong has re-deepened to a central pressure of 985 hPa (985.0 mbar; 29.09 inHg).
- 12:00 UTC
  - At 41.6°N 141.5°E – After the system enters the Tsugaru Strait, the JMA last notes Maria as it dissipates; the system fully succumbs six hours later south of Hokkaido.
  - At 43.4°N 148.0°E – The JMA assesses Son-Tinh has deepened with a central pressure of 1,004 hPa (1,004 mbar; 29.65 inHg) as it starts its extratropical transition.
  - At 31.8°N 147.2°E – The JMA downgrades Wukong to a tropical depression as it starts recurving away from Japan.
  - At 43.4°N 148.1°E – The JTWC downgrades Son-Tinh to a tropical disturbance.

August 15

- 00:00 UTC
  - At 29.5°N 141.2°E – The JMA upgrades Ampil into a typhoon as it moves northwards toward the southeastern coast of Japan.
  - At 47.3°N 154.7°E – Tropical Depression Son-Tinh becomes an extratropical cyclone near the Kuril Islands as it races off to the east, per the JMA.
  - At 35.7°N 146.1°E – The JTWC downgrades Wukong to a tropical disturbance as it turns to the northeast.
- 06:00 UTC at 30.5°N 141.1°E – The JTWC further upgrades Ampil to a Category 2 typhoon.
- 12:00 UTC at 31.6°N 140.8°E – The JMA assesses Ampil has reached its peak intensity with 10-minute sustained winds of 85 knots (157 km/h; 98 mph) and a minimum pressure of 950 hPa (950.0 mbar; 28.05 inHg).
- 18:00 UTC at 32.5°N 140.8°E – Typhoon Ampil intensifies to a Category 3 typhoon as it further approaches Japan, per the JTWC.

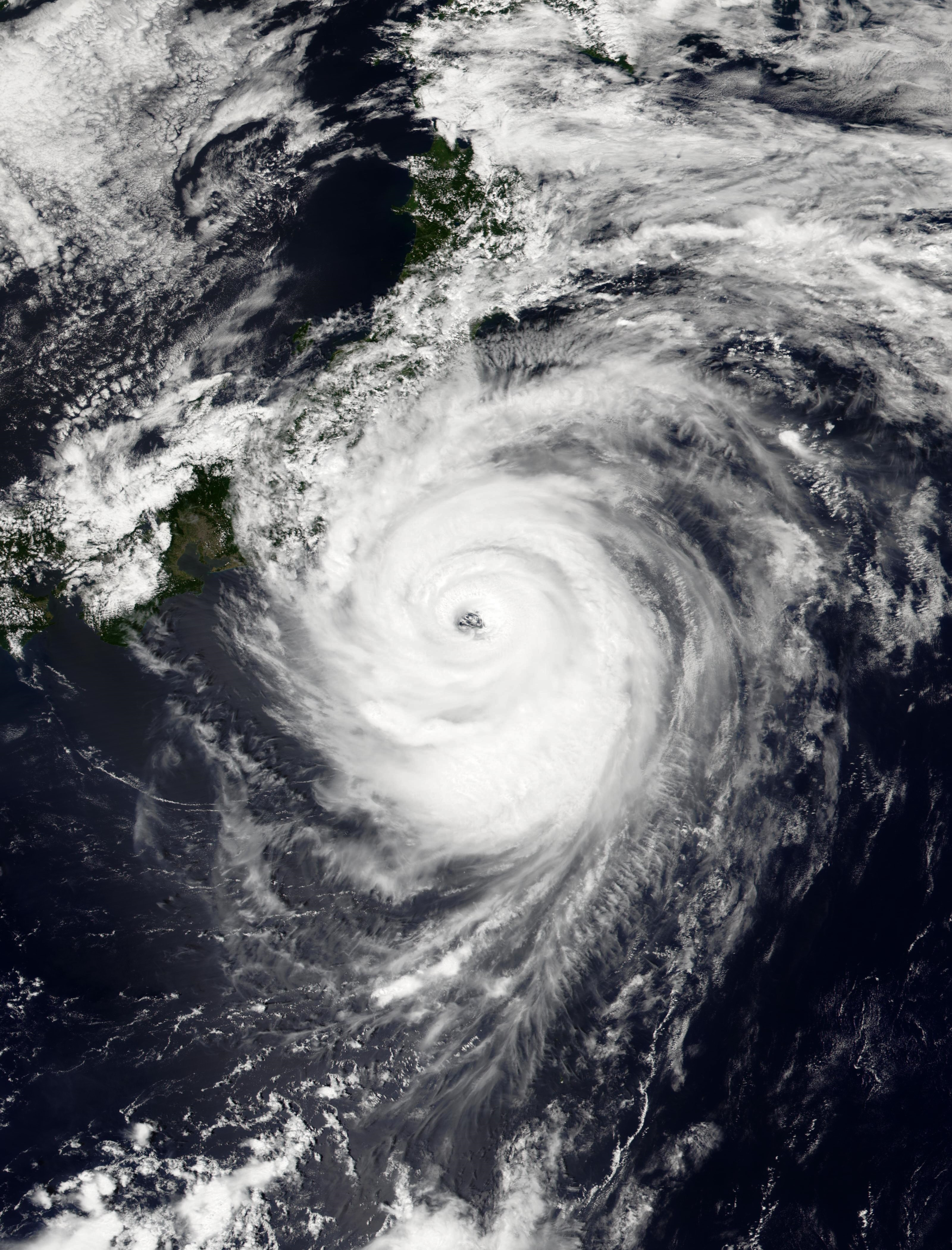
Ampil near its peak intensity making its closest approach to Japan on August 16.

August 16

- 00:00 UTC at 33.5°N 140.8°E – The JTWC assesses Ampil has reached its peak as a high-end Category 3 typhoon with 1-minute sustained winds of 110 knots (200 km/h; 130 mph) and a minimum pressure of 939 hPa (939.0 mbar; 27.73 inHg) as it starts to recurve away from Japan.
- 12:00 UTC at 39.4°N 160.5°E – The JMA reports Wukong has turned extratropical as it quickly moves eastward.

August 17

- 00:00 UTC
  - At 53.6°N 179.1°W – The JMA last notes the extratropical remnants of Son-Tinh over the Bering Sea after it crosses the IDL, leaving the basin.
  - At 36.6°N 143.9°E – The JTWC further downgrades Ampil to a Category 2 typhoon.
- 06:00 UTC at 37.2°N 145.7°E – Typhoon Ampil weakens to a Category 1 typhoon as it accelerates northeastward, per the JTWC.
- 18:00 UTC
  - At 38.3°N 150.1°E – The JMA downgrades Ampil to a severe tropical storm as it moves northeast.
  - At 38.7°N 149.9°E – The JTWC further downgrades Ampil to a tropical storm as it begins extratropical transition.

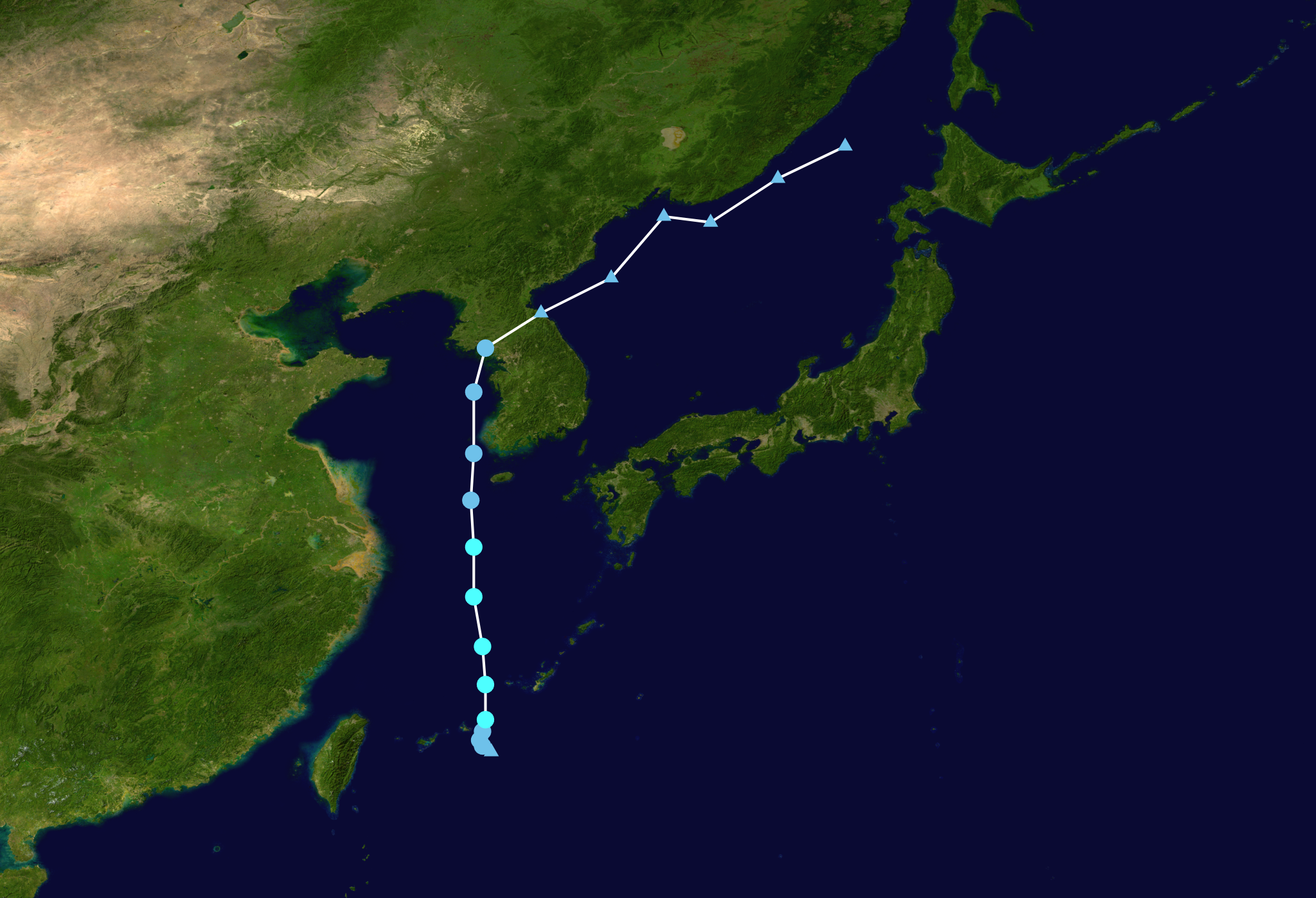
Track of Jongdari during mid-late August.

August 18

- 00:00 UTC
  - At 23.5°N 126.8°E – The JMA reports a tropical depression has formed south of the Ryukyu Islands.
  - (08:00 PHT) at 24.6°N 126.3°E – The PAGASA starts tracking the tropical depression south of the Ryukyus, designating it Dindo.
- 06:00 UTC
  - At 23.9°N 125.2°E – The JTWC recognizes Dindo, labelling it 10W.
  - At 40.6°N 155.5°E – The JTWC reports Ampil re-strengthens to a high-end tropical storm with 1-minute sustained winds of 60 knots (110 km/h; 69 mph) and a central pressure of 980 hPa (980.0 mbar; 28.94 inHg).
- 12:00 UTC
  - At 24.1°N 126.4°E – The JMA upgrades 10W (Dindo) into a tropical storm, naming it Jongdari.
  - At 42.0°N 158.3°E – Ampil completes its extratropical transition, per the JTWC.
- 18:00 UTC
  - A tropical depression forms over the East China Sea southwest of Kyushu. The JMA analyzes the system with a central pressure of 1,004 hPa (1,004 mbar; 29.65 inHg).
  - At 18.9°N 135.8°E – Another tropical depression forms over the Philippine Sea with a central pressure of 1,008 hPa (1,008 mbar; 29.77 inHg).
  - (02:00 PHT, August 19) at 24.6°N 126.2°E – The PAGASA also upgrades Jongdari (Dindo) to a tropical storm, attaining 10-minute winds of 35 knots (65 km/h; 40 mph) and a central pressure of 1,000 hPa (1,000 mbar; 29.53 inHg) as it slowly starts to move northwards.
- 23:00 UTC (07:00 PHT, August 19) – The PAGASA announces Jongdari (Dindo) has exited the PAR.

August 19

- 00:00 UTC
  - At 44.2°N 162.5°E – The JMA determines Ampil has turned into an extratropical cyclone.
  - At 25.1°N 125.8°E – The JTWC upgrades Jongdari to a tropical storm as it enters the East China Sea, subsequently attaining its peak 1-minute winds of 35 knots (65 km/h; 40 mph).
- 06:00 UTC
  - At 26.3°N 126.0°E – The JMA assesses Jongdari has attained its peak with 10-minute winds of 40 knots (74 km/h; 46 mph) and a central pressure of 996 hPa (996.0 mbar; 29.41 inHg) while the JTWC assesses the system has deepened to a central pressure of 995 hPa (995.0 mbar; 29.38 inHg).
  - At 20.1°N 134.7°E – The tropical depression over the Philippine Sea re-deepens to a central pressure of 1,008 hPa (1,008 mbar; 29.77 inHg).
  - At 39.7°N 179.9°W – The JMA stops tracking the extratropical remnants of Wukong after it had crossed the IDL.
- 18:00 UTC at 34.1°N 128.2°E – The JMA last notes the tropical depression near Kyushu as it enters the Korea Strait; it dissipates at 00 UTC the next day.

August 20

- 06:00 UTC
  - At 14.8°N 147.7°E – The JMA marks a tropical depression east of the Mariana Islands with a central pressure of 1,008 hPa (1,008 mbar; 29.77 inHg).
  - At 32.6°N 125.5°E – The JTWC downgrades Jongdari to a tropical depression as it continues to move northward towards the Yellow Sea, passing west of Jeju Island.

August 21

- 00:00 UTC
  - At 37.7°N 126.1°E – The JMA downgrades Jongdari to a tropical depression as it is about to make landfall on Korea.
  - At 37.9°N 125.7°E – The JTWC assesses Jongdari has deepened to its lowest central pressure of 983 hPa (983.0 mbar; 29.03 inHg).
- Between 00:00-03:00 UTC (09:00-12:00 PYT/KST) – Jongdari makes landfall near the Korean Demilitarized Zone.
- 06:00 UTC
  - At 60.4°N 178.1°E – The JMA last notes the extratropical remnants of Ampil over the Bering Sea after crossing 60°N.
  - At 16.2°N 143.5°E – The JTWC designates the tropical depression near the Marianas as 11W after passing the said islands.
  - At 38.9°N 127.7°E – The JTWC downgrades Jongdari to a tropical disturbance as it emerges over the Sea of Japan.
- 12:00 UTC at 16.9°N 142.6°E – The JTWC upgrades 11W to a tropical storm as it slowly moves westward.
- 18:00 UTC
  - At 16.6°N 142.2°E – The JMA upgrades 11W to a tropical storm, giving it the international name Shanshan.
  - At 42.3°N 132.1°E – The JMA assesses that Jongdari has slightly deepened to a central pressure of 1,004 hPa (1,004 mbar; 29.65 inHg) as it starts its extratropical transition while paralleling the coast of Primorsky Krai.

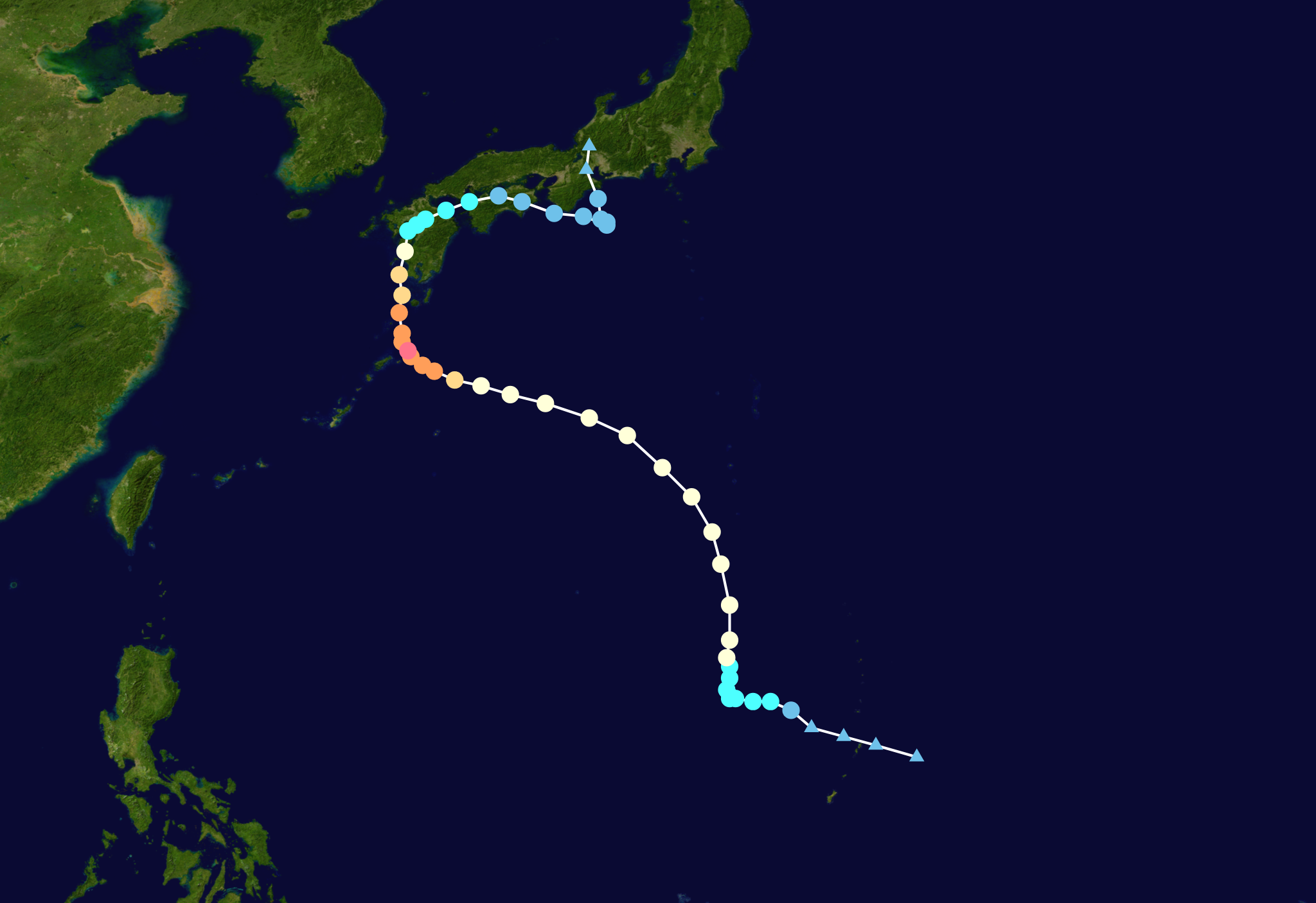
Track of Shanshan during late August to early September.

August 22

- 00:00 UTC at 42.1°N 133.7°E – The JMA reports Jongdari has turned extratropical over the Sea of Japan.
- 12:00 UTC
  - At 16.6°N 141.6°E – The JMA further upgrades Shanshan to a severe tropical storm as it slowly steers to the north.
  - At 44.7°N 138.3°E – The JMA last notes the extratropical remnants of Jongdari as the system would fully dissipate six hours later.

August 23

- 06:00 UTC at 26.9°N 131.0°E – Meandering near the Ryukyu Islands, the tropical depression over the Philippine Sea re-deepens to a central pressure of 1,008 hPa (1,008 mbar; 29.77 inHg), per the JMA.
- 12:00 UTC at 18.1°N 141.1°E – The JTWC further upgrades Shanshan to a Category 1 typhoon as it slowly accelerates northwards.

August 24

- 00:00 UTC at 20.0°N 141.3°E – The JMA follows suit, upgrading Shanshan to a typhoon.
- 12:00 UTC at 26.1°N 128.4°E – The JMA analyzes that the tropical depression over the Philippine Sea has attained a lower central pressure of 1,006 hPa (1,006 mbar; 29.71 inHg) as it makes its close approach to Okinawa.

August 25

- 12:00 UTC at 26.5°N 136.6°E – The JTWC assesses that Shanshan has attained maximum 1-minute sustained winds of 75 knots (139 km/h; 86 mph) while moving west-northwestwards after passing west of the Ogasawara Islands.
- 18:00 UTC
  - At 24.6°N 125.2°E – The tropical depression over the Philippine Sea deepens further to its lowest central pressure of 1,004 hPa (1,004 mbar; 29.65 inHg) after passing near the Miyako Islands.
  - At 26.9°N 135.0°E – The JTWC assesses that Shanshan has attained a central pressure of 971 hPa (971.0 mbar; 28.67 inHg) before slightly weakening.

August 26

- 00:00 UTC at 24.1°N 125.3°E – The JMA last notes the tropical depression over the Philippine Sea; the system dissipates six hours later.
- 12:00 UTC at 27.7°N 131.9°E – The JTWC reports Shanshan has re-intensified and is now a Category 2 typhoon as it slows down while nearing the Ryukyu Islands.
- 18:00 UTC at 28.0°N 131.1°E – Typhoon Shanshan further intensifies to a Category 3 typhoon while slowly moving to the north-northwest.

August 27

- 12:00 UTC at 28.6°N 130.3°E – The JTWC reports Shanshan has further intensified into a Category 4 typhoon, subsequently peaking with 1-minute sustained winds of 115 knots (213 km/h; 132 mph) and a central pressure of 935 hPa (935.0 mbar; 27.61 inHg) as it stalls near the Amami Islands.
- 15:00 UTC at 28.7°N 130.3°E – The JMA assesses Shanshan has attained its peak with 10-minute sustained winds of 95 knots (176 km/h; 109 mph) and a minimum pressure of 935 hPa (935.0 mbar; 27.61 inHg).
- 18:00 UTC at 29.0°N 130.1°E – The JTWC determines Shanshan has leveled off from its peak and is now a Category 3 typhoon.

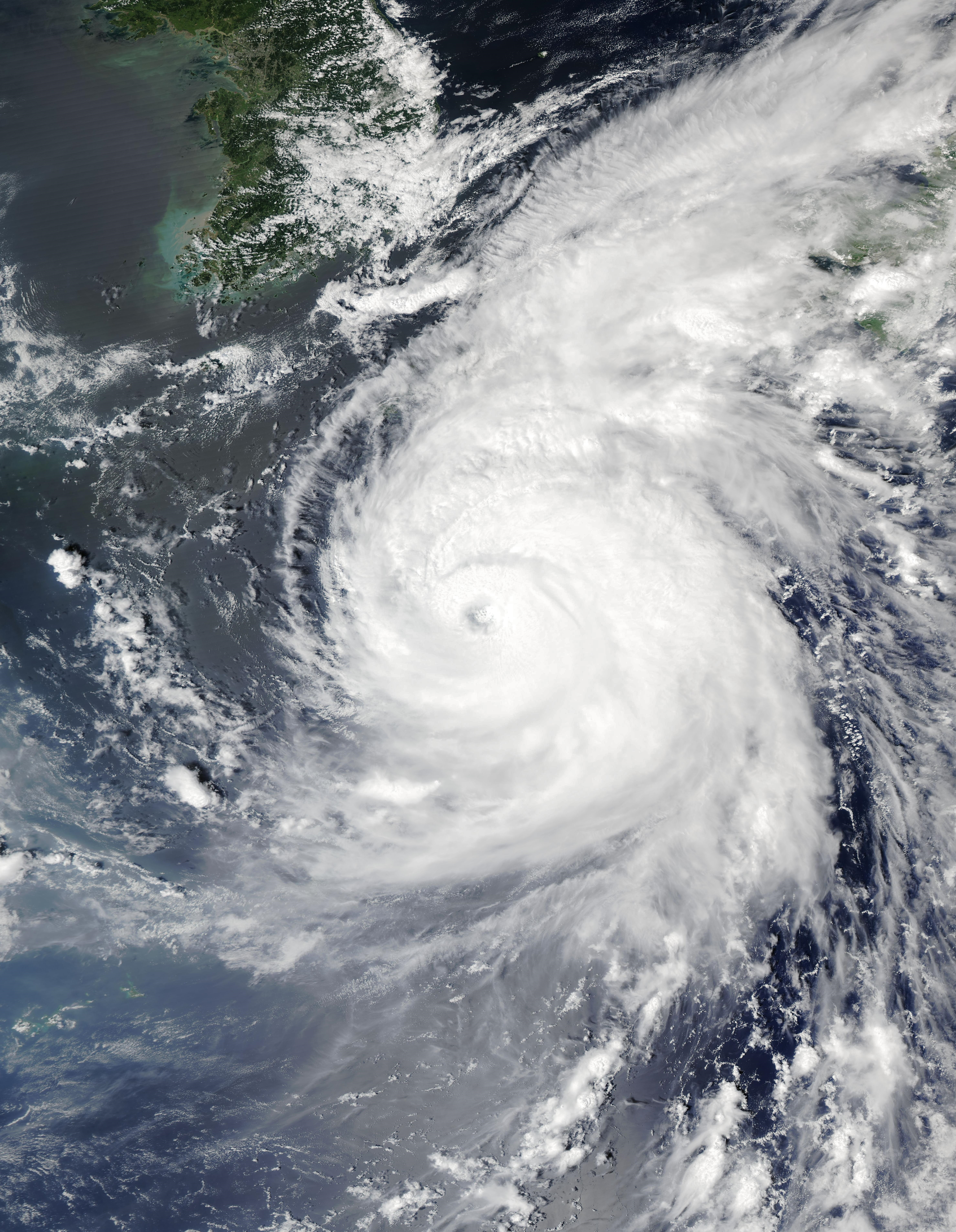
Shanshan before making landfall on Japan on August 28.

August 28

- 12:00 UTC at 30.6°N 130.0°E – The JTWC further downgrades Shanshan to a Category 2 typhoon as it nears Kyushu.
- 23:00 UTC (08:00 JST) at 31.9°N 130.3°E – Typhoon Shanshan hits Satsumasendai City, Kagoshima Prefecture.

August 29

- 00:00 UTC at 31.9°N 130.2°E – The JTWC downgrades Shanshan to a Category 1 typhoon upon making landfall on Kyushu.
- 06:00 UTC
  - At 32.7°N 130.2°E – The JMA downgrades Shanshan into a severe tropical storm as it turns to the east.
  - At 32.7°N 130.5°E – The JTWC further downgrades Shanshan to a tropical storm.
- 12:00 UTC at 32.8°N 130.5°E – The JMA further downgrades Shanshan to a tropical storm as it continues to traverse Kyushu.

August 30

- Between 06:00-12:00 UTC (15:00-21:00 JST) – After briefly emerging over the Seto Inland Sea, Shanshan makes another landfall on Ehime Prefecture on northern Shikoku.
- 12:00 UTC
  - At 34.0°N 133.6°E – The JMA reports Shanshan has weakened to a tropical depression as it turns southwestward.
  - At 34.1°N 133.1°E – The JTWC further downgrades Shanshan to a tropical depression.

August 31

- 12:00 UTC at 12.1°N 128.9°E – The JMA marks a tropical depression over the Philippine Sea east of Samar.
- 18:00 UTC at 11.5°N 127.7°E – The JTWC designates the tropical depression east of Samar as 12W.

=== September ===
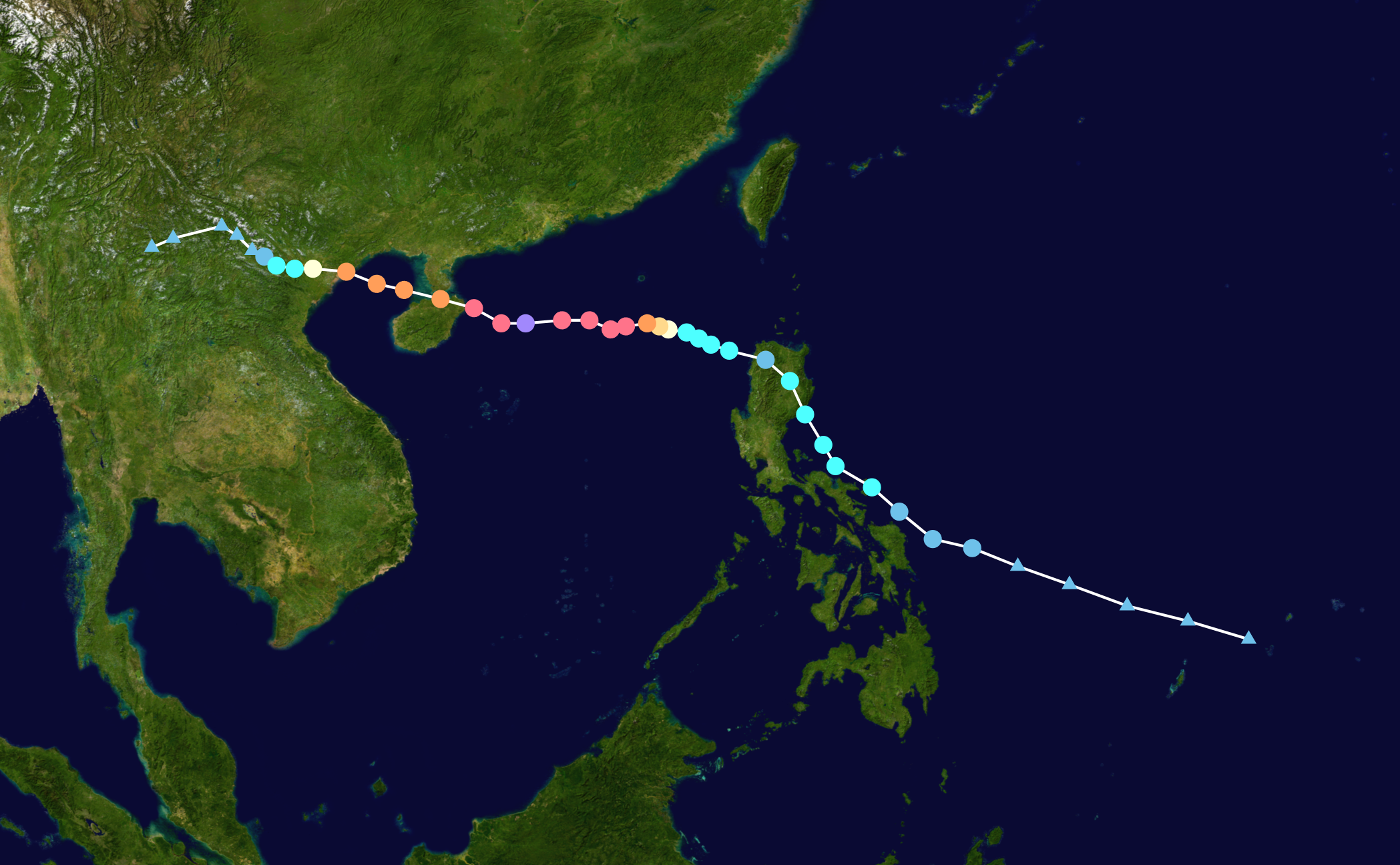
Track of Yagi during early September.

September 1

- 00:00 UTC (08:00 PHT) at 12.2°N 126.2°E – The PAGASA starts tracking 12W, designating it Enteng as the system turns northwestward.
- 06:00 UTC at 13.1°N 125.1°E – The JMA reports 12W (Enteng) has strengthened into a tropical storm, naming it Yagi.
- Between 06:00-12:00 UTC (15:00-21:00 JST) – Briefly emerging over the Pacific Ocean, Shanshan turns northward and makes its final hit on Mie Prefecture on southern Honshu.
- 12:00 UTC
  - At 22.2°N 147.1°E – A tropical depression forms to the northeast of the Mariana Islands.
  - At 13.8°N 124.2°E – The JTWC upgrades Yagi (Enteng) into a tropical storm while grazing the northeastern coast of Catanduanes.
  - (20:00 PHT) at 14.0°N 124.4°E – The PAGASA follows suit, upgrading Yagi (Enteng) into a tropical storm.
  - At 35.1°N 136.3°E – The JMA last notes Shanshan as it moves inland; the system dissipates six hours later.
  - At 35.0°N 136.4°E – The JTWC further downgrades Shanshan to a tropical disturbance as it moves northward.
- 18:00 UTC at 22.6°N 146.8°E – The tropical depression northeast of the Mariana Islands slightly deepens to a central pressure of 1,010 hPa (1,010 mbar; 29.83 inHg) before briefly rising again, per the JMA.

September 2

- 00:00 UTC
  - At 15.3°N 122.9°E – The JMA assesses Yagi (Enteng) has reached its initial peak with 10-minute sustained winds of 45 knots (83 km/h; 52 mph) and a central pressure of 994 hPa (994.0 mbar; 29.35 inHg) as it moves towards Luzon.
  - At 25.1°N 180.0°E – The JMA begins tracking Hone which had entered the basin from the Eastern Pacific as a tropical depression. The agency assesses the system with a central pressure of 1,004 hPa (1,004 mbar; 29.65 inHg).
- 06:00 UTC
  - (14:00 PHT) at 16.2°N 122.2°E – Yagi (Enteng) makes its first landfall at Casiguran, Aurora. At the same time, the JTWC assesses the system with 1-minute sustained winds of 50 knots (93 km/h; 58 mph) and a central pressure of 993 hPa (993.0 mbar; 29.32 inHg).
  - At 23.6°N 146.5°E – The JMA assesses the tropical depression northeast of the Mariana Islands slightly re-deepens to a central pressure of 1,010 hPa (1,010 mbar; 29.83 inHg) as it generally moves northward.
- 18:00 UTC at 17.8°N 120.9°E – The JTWC downgrades Yagi (Enteng) to a tropical depression as it is about to emerge over the South China Sea.

September 3

- 00:00 UTC
  - At 18.3°N 119.6°E – The JTWC reports Yagi (Enteng) has re-strengthened to a tropical storm after emerging over the South China Sea.
  - At 24.7°N 147.1°E – The JTWC begins tracking the tropical depression northeast of the Marianas, designating it 13W.
- 06:00 UTC (14:00 PHT) at 18.5°N 119.0°E – The PAGASA upgrades Yagi (Enteng) to a severe tropical storm as it decelerates.
- 12:00 UTC at 18.8°N 118.7°E – The JMA also upgrades Yagi (Enteng) to a severe tropical storm as it slowly moves westward.
- 18:00 UTC (02:00 PHT, September 4) at 18.9°N 118.3°E – The PAGASA assesses Yagi (Enteng) has reached its peak within the PAR with 10-minute winds of 60 knots (110 km/h; 69 mph) and a central pressure of 975 hPa (975.0 mbar; 28.79 inHg) as it is about to exit the area.
- 20:00 UTC (04:00 PHT, September 4) – Yagi (Enteng) exits the PAR, as announced by the PAGASA.

September 4

- 00:00 UTC
  - At 19.0°N 117.6°E – The JMA further upgrades Yagi to a typhoon as it continues to intensify.
  - At 19.0°N 117.8°E – The JTWC upgrades Yagi to a Category 1 typhoon.
- 06:00 UTC
  - At 29.2°N 146.9°E – The JMA assesses 13W has deepened to a lower central pressure of 1,004 hPa (1,004 mbar; 29.65 inHg) before briefly rising as it gradually accelerates.
  - At 19.1°N 117.5°E – The JTWC reports Yagi has rapidly intensified to a Category 2 typhoon as it continues to move slowly westwards.
  - The JMA begins tracking a tropical depression southwest of the Ogasawara Islands with a central pressure of 1,004 hPa (1,004 mbar; 29.65 inHg).
- 12:00 UTC at 19.2°N 117.0°E – Typhoon Yagi continues to intensify rapidly and is now a high-end Category 3 typhoon, per the JTWC.
- 18:00 UTC
  - At 19.1°N 116.2°E – Yagi strengthens further into a high-end Category 4 typhoon and is nearing super-typhoon status.
  - At 30.8°N 146.4°E – The JTWC upgrades 13W to a tropical storm while moving northward southeast of Japan.
- 21:00 UTC at 19.1°N 115.9°E – The JTWC reports Yagi has strengthened further into a Category 5 super typhoon, subsequently peaking with 1-minute sustained winds of 140 knots (260 km/h; 160 mph) and a central pressure of 912 hPa (912.0 mbar; 26.93 inHg).

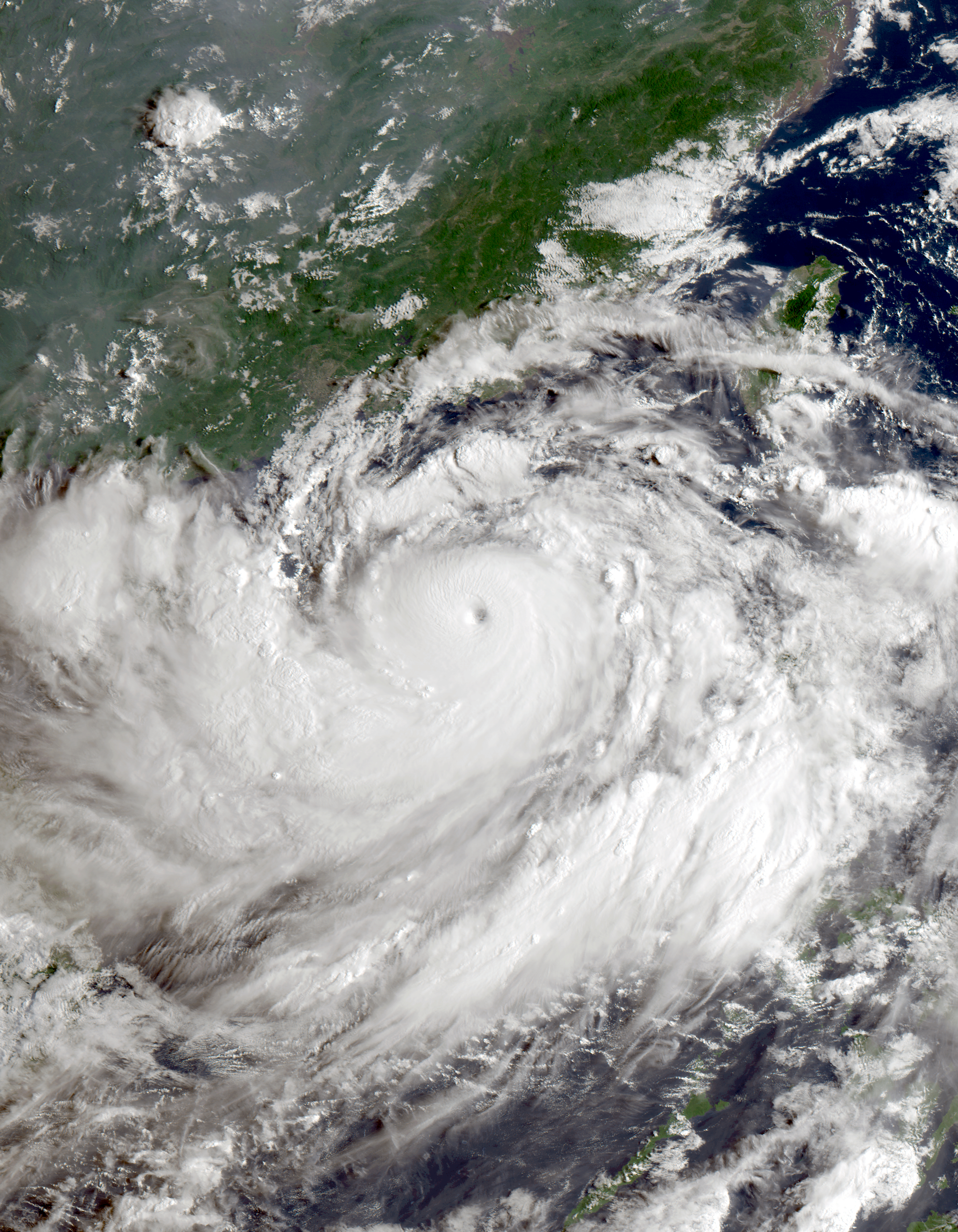
Yagi on its first Category 5 peak intensity over the South China Sea on September 5.

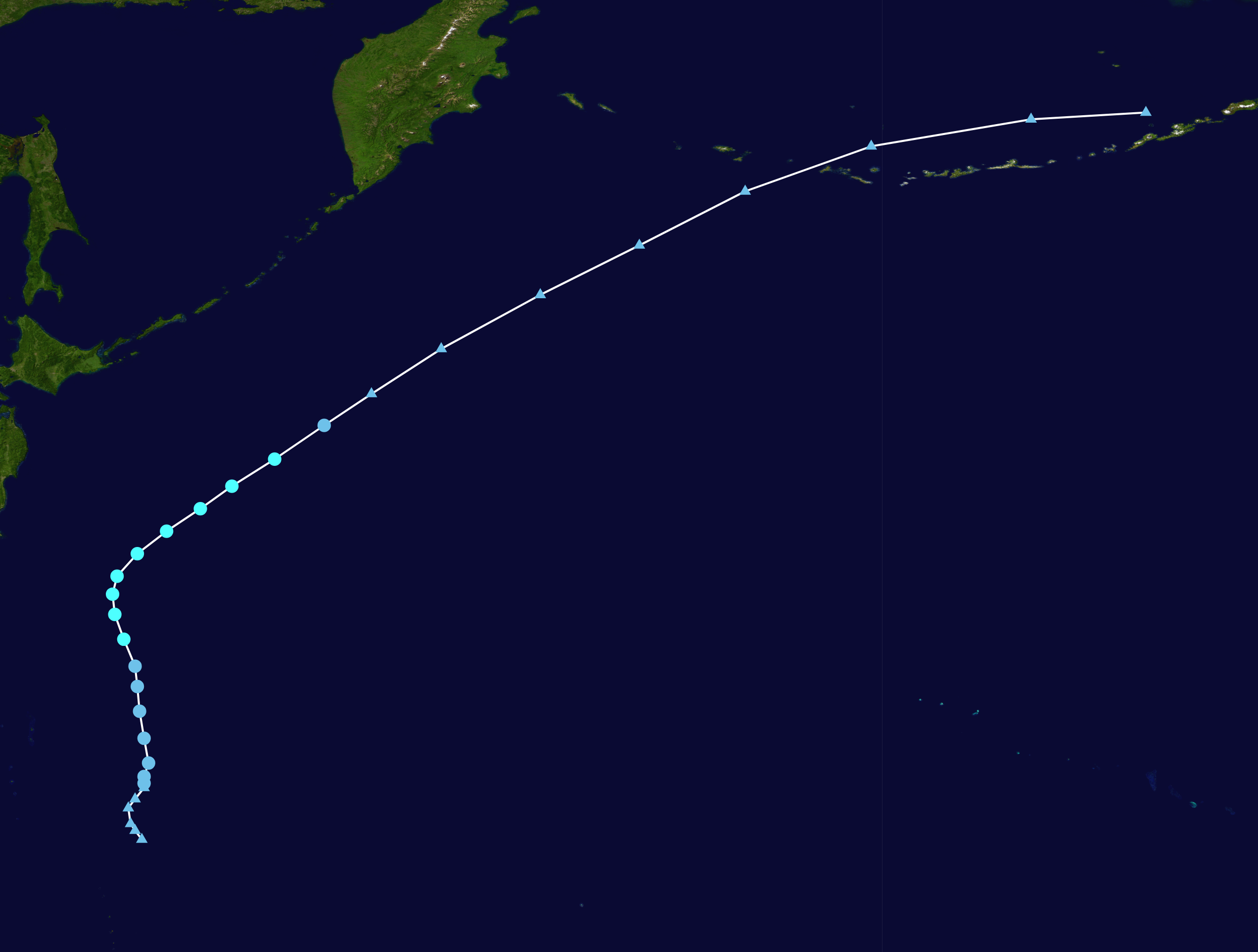
Track of Leepi during early September.

September 5

- 00:00 UTC
  - At 19.0°N 115.8°E – The JMA assesses Yagi has peaked with 10-minute sustained winds of 105 knots (194 km/h; 121 mph) and a central pressure of 915 hPa (915.0 mbar; 27.02 inHg).
  - At 19.1°N 116.7°E – The JTWC assesses Yagi has slightly weakened into a Category 4 super typhoon as it slowly accelerates westward.
  - At 32.2°N 145.9°E – The JMA upgrades 13W to a tropical storm, naming it Leepi, subsequently peaking with 10-minute winds of 35 knots (65 km/h; 40 mph) and a central pressure of 1,002 hPa (1,002 mbar; 29.59 inHg).
- 06:00 UTC at 19.2°N 115.1°E – The JTWC determines Yagi has weakened below super-typhoon status.
- 18:00 UTC
  - At 19.2°N 113.0°E – After briefly weakening, the JTWC analyzes Yagi has rapidly re-intensified into a Category 5 super typhoon, subsequently attaining its best peak with 1-minute sustained winds of 145 knots (269 km/h; 167 mph) and a central pressure of 907 hPa (907.0 mbar; 26.78 inHg) as it approaches Hainan.
  - At 35.0°N 146.9°E – The JTWC assesses Leepi has peaked with 1-minute winds of 40 knots (74 km/h; 46 mph) and a central pressure of 977 hPa (977.0 mbar; 28.85 inHg) after turning to the northeast.
  - At 33.1°N 176.9°E – After days of moving generally northward, the JMA determines Hone has turned to the west, assessing the system has slightly deepened with a central pressure of 1,016 hPa (1,016 mbar; 30.00 inHg).

Yagi making landfall over Wenchang City in Hainan on September 6.

September 6

- 00:00 UTC
  - At 19.2°N 112.2°E – The JTWC reports Yagi has weakened back into a Category 4 super typhoon as it turns to the west-northwest.
  - The JMA reports the tropical depression southwest of the Ogasawara Islands has degenerated into a remnant low.
- 06:00 UTC at 19.8°N 111.2°E – The JTWC downgrades Yagi to a Category 4 typhoon as it is about to hit Hainan.
- 08:20 UTC (16:20 CST) at 19.9°N 111.0°E – Typhoon Yagi makes its second landfall at Wengtian, Wenchang City, Hainan.
- 12:00 UTC
  - At 20.1°N 110.2°E – The JTWC further downgrades Yagi to a Category 3 typhoon as it is about to emerge over the Qiongzhou Strait.
  - At 37.8°N 151.1°E – The JMA downgrades Leepi to a tropical depression as it speeds off to the northeast while undergoing extratropical transition.
- 14:20 UTC (22:20 CST) at 20.3°N 109.9°E – Typhoon Yagi clips the Leizhou Peninsula, making landfall on Jiaowei, Xuwen County, Zhanjiang, Guangdong.

September 7

- 00:00 UTC
  - At 20.5°N 108.2°E – Now over the Gulf of Tonkin, the JTWC reports Yagi has slightly re-strengthened to a high-end Category 3 typhoon with 1-minute sustained winds of 110 knots (200 km/h; 130 mph).
  - At 40.6°N 155.6°E – The JMA assesses Leepi has turned extratropical well east of Japan.
  - At 40.8°N 155.0°E – The JTWC reports Leepi has weakened into a tropical depression.
- 06:00 UTC
  - (13:00 ICT) at 21.0°N 107.0°E – Typhoon Yagi makes its fourth and final hit at the Quảng Ninh-Haiphong area. At the same time, the JMA assesses the system has re-strengthened with 10-minute sustained winds of 90 knots (170 km/h; 100 mph) and a central pressure of 935 hPa (935.0 mbar; 27.61 inHg).
  - At 20.9°N 107.1°E – The JTWC assesses Yagi has deepened to a central pressure of 943 hPa (943.0 mbar; 27.85 inHg) upon making landfall.
  - At 41.7°N 157.6°E – The JTWC determines Leepi has turned into an extratropical low.
- 12:00 UTC
  - At 20.9°N 106.0°E – The JMA assesses Yagi has rapidly weakened into a severe tropical storm.
  - At 21.0°N 106.0°E – The JTWC determines Yagi has rapidly weakened into a Category 1 typhoon.
- 18:00 UTC
  - At 20.8°N 105.7°E – The JMA further downgrades Yagi into a tropical storm as it slowly meanders inland.
  - At 21.2°N 105.0°E – The JTWC reports Yagi has weakened further into a tropical storm after passing over Hanoi.

September 8

- 00:00 UTC at 33.7°N 168.4°E – The JMA last notes Tropical Depression Hone as it dissipates six hours later.
- 06:00 UTC at 21.4°N 103.9°E – The JTWC further downgrades Yagi to a tropical depression.
- 12:00 UTC
  - At 21.5°N 104.2°E – The JMA downgrades Yagi into a tropical depression while moving further inland.
  - At 21.7°N 103.6°E – The JTWC determines Yagi has weakened into a tropical disturbance.
- 18:00 UTC at 54.0°N 173.0°W – The JMA stops tracking the extratropical remnants of Leepi over the Bering Sea after it had crossed the IDL.

September 9

- 12:00 UTC at 21.7°N 100.7°E – The JMA last notes Yagi as it moves further inland, with the system dissipating six hours later over southwestern China.
- 18:00 UTC
  - At 23.9°N 127.4°E – The JMA reports the remnant low of a former tropical depression southwest of the Ogasawara Islands has regenerated into a tropical depression near the Ryukyus, with a lower central pressure of 1,000 hPa (1,000 mbar; 29.53 inHg).
  - At 10.1°N 147.8°E – The JMA marks a tropical depression southeast of Guam.
  - At 10.7°N 146.8°E – The JTWC designates the tropical depression southeast of Guam as 14W.

September 10

- 00:00 UTC at 25.8°N 125.4°E – The JMA assesses the tropical depression near the Ryukyus has attained 10-minute winds of 30 knots (56 km/h; 35 mph) as it enters the East China Sea.
- 12:00 UTC
  - At 12.8°N 145.4°E – The JMA upgrades 14W to a tropical storm, naming it Bebinca.
  - At 12.6°N 145.5°E – The JTWC also upgrades Bebinca to a tropical storm while passing close to Guam.

September 11

- Between 00:00-06:00 UTC (08:00-14:00 CST) at 29.9°N 121.6°E – The tropical depression over the East China Sea makes landfall on southern Ningbo, Zhejiang.

September 12

- 00:00 UTC at 18.0°N 140.0°E – The JMA assesses Bebinca has attained its initial peak with 10-minute winds of 45 knots (83 km/h; 52 mph) and a central pressure of 992 hPa (992.0 mbar; 29.29 inHg) as it moves to the northwest.
- 06:00 UTC at 19.4°N 139.3°E – The JTWC also reports Bebinca has attained its initial peak as a high-end tropical storm with 1-minute winds of 60 knots (110 km/h; 69 mph) and a central pressure of 982 hPa (982.0 mbar; 29.00 inHg).
- 18:00 UTC at 34.2°N 117.0°E – The JMA last notes the tropical depression over East China as it deteriorates; the system fully dissipates at 00 UTC the next day.

September 13

- 10:00 UTC (18:00 PHT) – The PAGASA reports Tropical Storm Bebinca has entered the PAR, naming it Ferdie.
- 12:00 UTC (20:00 PHT) at 24.7°N 133.7°E – The PAGASA upgrades Bebinca (Ferdie) to a severe tropical storm, simultaneously attaining its within-PAR peak with 10-minute winds of 50 knots (93 km/h; 58 mph) and a central pressure of 990 hPa (990.0 mbar; 29.23 inHg).
- 16:00 UTC (00:00 PHT, September 14) – The PAGASA announces Bebinca (Ferdie) has exited the PAR.
- 18:00 UTC at 25.3°N 132.6°E – The JMA also upgrades Bebinca to a severe tropical storm as it approaches the Daito Islands.

September 14

- 18:00 UTC
  - At 28.9°N 128.0°E – After passing close to the Amami Islands, the JMA upgrades Bebinca to a typhoon.
  - At 29.0°N 128.2°E – The JTWC also upgrades Bebinca to a Category 1 typhoon as it moves northwestward over the East China Sea.

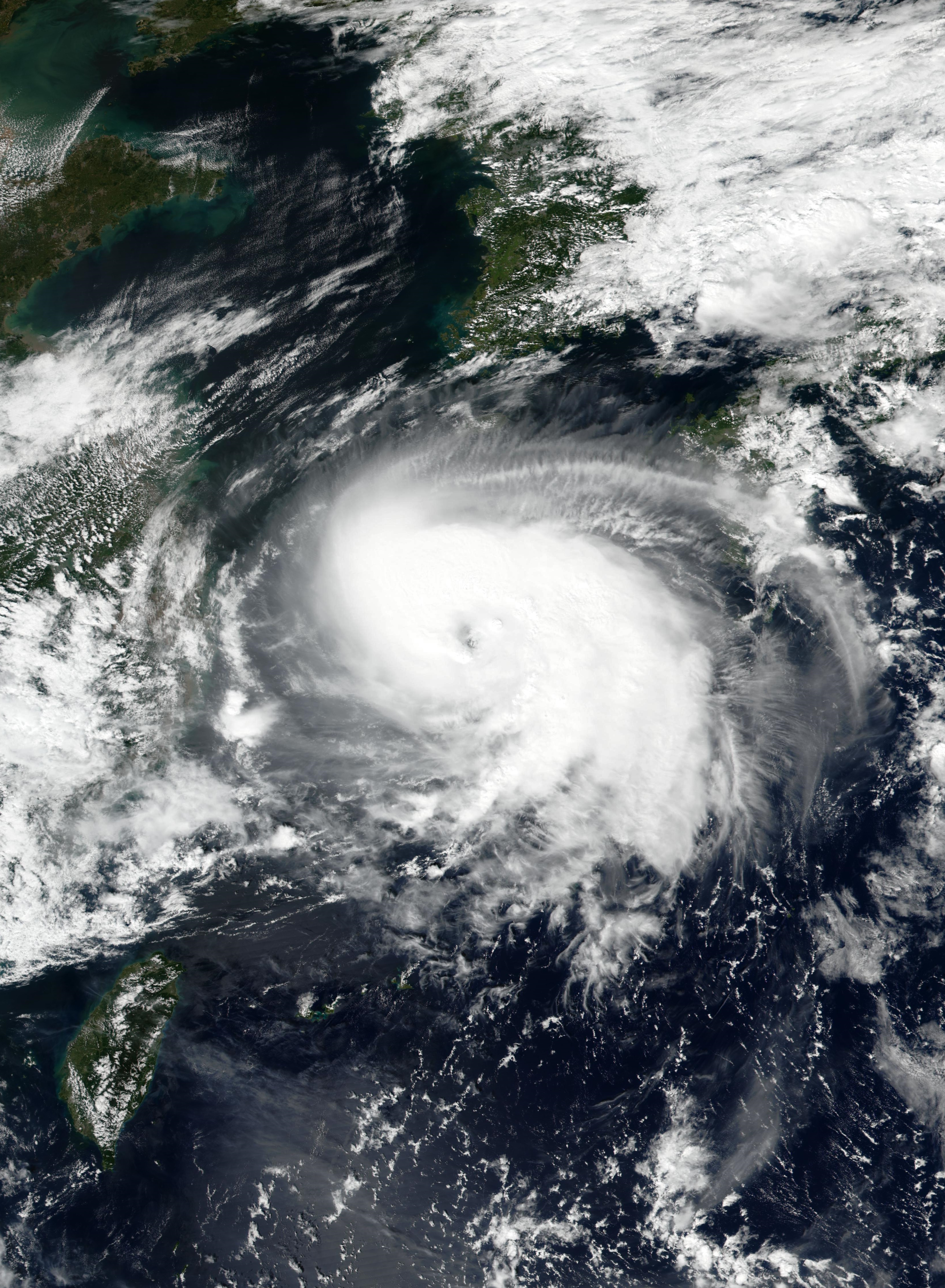
Bebinca at its peak intensity approaching East China on September 15.

September 15

- 00:00 UTC
  - At 29.6°N 127.2°E – The JMA assesses Bebinca has attained its peak intensity with 10-minute winds of 75 knots (139 km/h; 86 mph) and a central pressure of 965 hPa (965.0 mbar; 28.50 inHg) as it turns to the west-northwest.
  - At 16.7°N 126.0°E – A tropical depression forms over the Philippine Sea east of Luzon.
  - At 12.1°N 144.6°E – The JMA marks another tropical depression near Guam.
- 06:00 UTC
  - At 30.2°N 126.0°E – The JTWC also reports Bebinca has attained its peak as a high-end Category 1 typhoon with 1-minute winds of 80 knots (150 km/h; 92 mph) and a central pressure of 959 hPa (959.0 mbar; 28.32 inHg) as it approaches East China.
  - At 16.8°N 126.5°E – The JMA assesses the tropical depression east of Luzon deepens to a central pressure of 996 hPa (996.0 mbar; 29.41 inHg).
- 12:00 UTC
  - At 12.8°N 144.3°E – The JMA upgrades the tropical depression near Guam to a tropical storm, naming it Pulasan as it makes its closest approach to the island.
  - (20:00 PHT) at 16.9°N 125.9°E – The PAGASA starts tracking the tropical depression east of Luzon, naming it Gener.
- 18:00 UTC at 17.3°N 125.6°E – The JMA assesses Gener has re-deepened to a central pressure of 996 hPa (996.0 mbar; 29.41 inHg) as it slowly moves westward.
- 23:00 UTC (07:00 CST, September 16) at 30.9°N 121.9°E – Typhoon Bebinca hits Nanhui New City, Pudong, Shanghai.

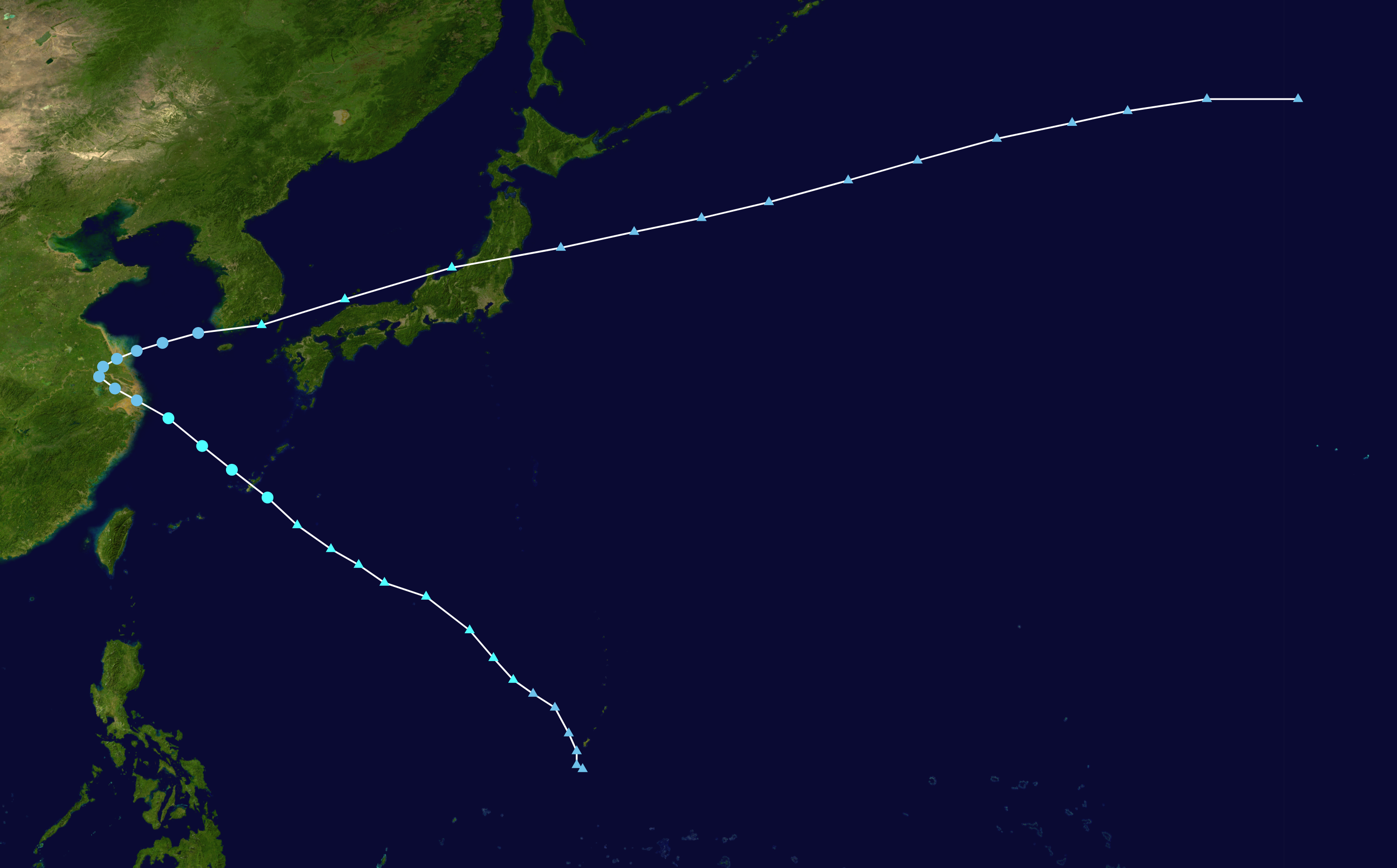
Track of Pulasan during mid-late September.

September 16

- 06:00 UTC
  - At 17.4°N 124.7°E – The JMA analyzes Gener's central pressure leveled back to 996 hPa (996.0 mbar; 29.41 inHg) as it gradually accelerates towards Luzon.
  - At 31.4°N 120.5°E – The JMA downgrades Bebinca to a severe tropical storm as it moves further inland.
  - At 31.5°N 120.3°E – The JTWC also downgrades Bebinca to a tropical storm as it continues to weaken.
- 16:00 UTC (00:00 PHT, September 17) at 17.1°N 122.4°E – Tropical Depression Gener makes landfall at Palanan, Isabela.
- 18:00 UTC at 31.9°N 118.0°E – The JMA further downgrades Bebinca to a tropical storm while moving over Anhui Province.

September 17

- 00:00 UTC
  - At 20.0°N 140.1°E – The JMA assesses Pulasan has reached its peak intensity with 10-minute sustained winds of 45 knots (83 km/h; 52 mph) and a central pressure of 992 hPa (992.0 mbar; 29.29 inHg) while turning to the west-northwest.
  - At 32.4°N 117.2°E – Bebinca weakens further to a tropical depression, per the JMA, as it moves northwestward.
  - At 32.5°N 117.3°E – The JTWC also downgrades Bebinca to a tropical depression, but slightly deepened to 976 hPa (976.0 mbar; 28.82 inHg).
- 03:00 UTC (11:00 PHT) – After emerging back over water, PAGASA assesses that Gener has reached its within-PAR peak of 10-minute winds of 30 knots (56 km/h; 35 mph) and a central pressure of 996 hPa (996.0 mbar; 29.41 inHg).
- 06:00 UTC at 33.0°N 116.3°E – The JTWC stops tracking Bebinca as it weakens to a tropical disturbance.
- 11:00 UTC (19:00 PHT) – Tropical Storm Pulasan enters the PAR, prompting the PAGASA to name it Helen.
- 12:00 UTC (20:00 PHT) at 21.7°N 134.5°E – The PAGASA assesses Pulasan (Helen) has reached its within-PAR peak of 10-minute sustained winds of 45 knots (83 km/h; 52 mph) and a central pressure of 994 hPa (994.0 mbar; 29.35 inHg).
- 18:00 UTC (02:00 PHT, September 18) at 17.4°N 117.7°E – The PAGASA reports Gener has exited the PAR as it moves over the South China Sea.

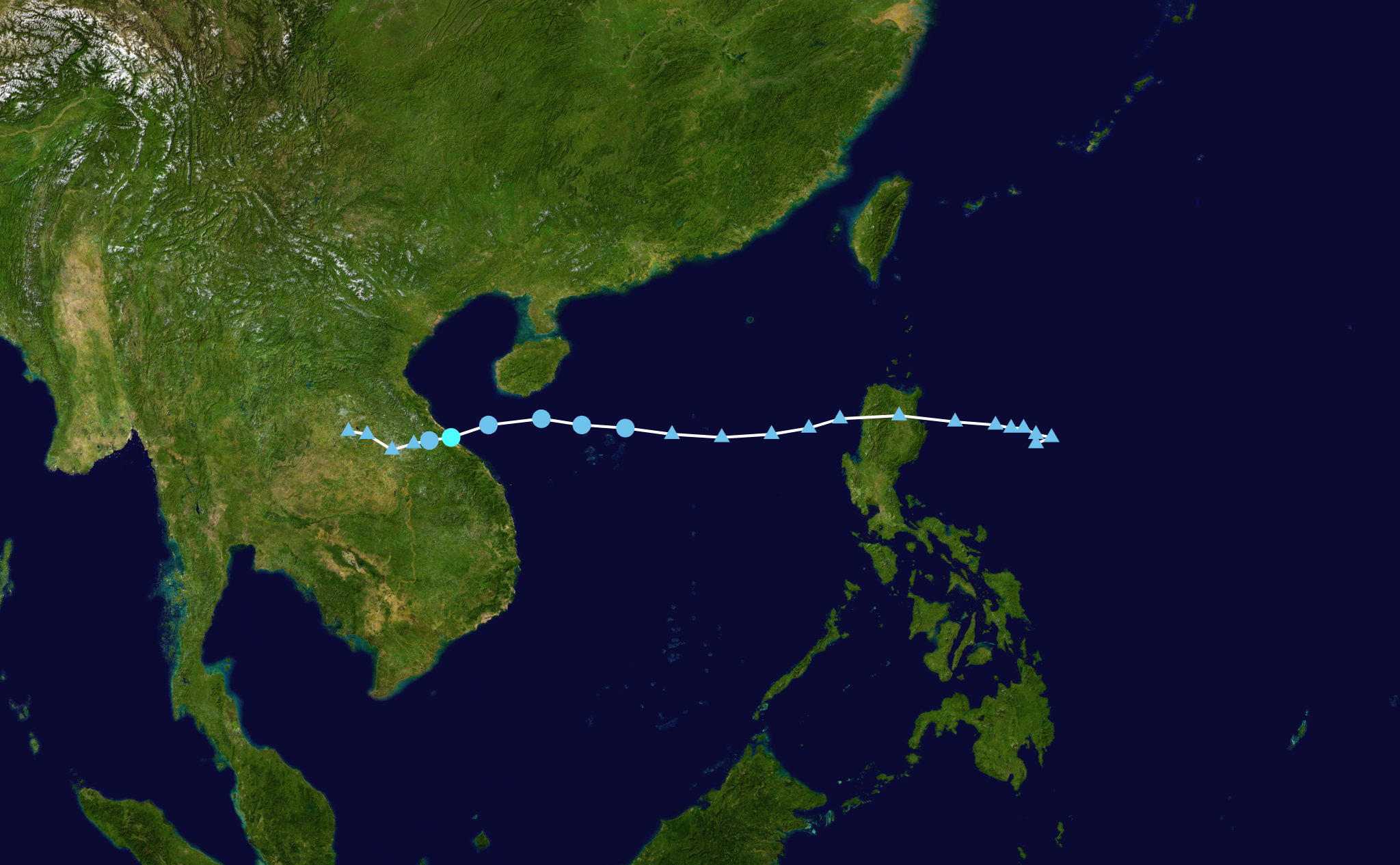
Track of Soulik during mid-late September.

September 18

- 06:00 UTC
  - At 17.7°N 113.5°E – The JTWC recognizes Ex-Gener, designating it 16W.
  - At 33.8°N 115.1°E – The JMA last notes Bebinca as it slows down over Central China; it dissipates six hours later over Henan Province.
- 09:00 UTC (17:00 PHT) – The PAGASA announces Pulasan (Helen) has exited the PAR.
- 12:00 UTC at 25.8°N 128.6°E – The JTWC reports Pulasan has transformed from being a monsoon depression into a tropical storm, with 1-minute winds of 45 knots (83 km/h; 52 mph) and a central pressure of 980 hPa (980.0 mbar; 28.94 inHg) as it approaches Okinawa.
- Between 12:00-18:00 UTC (21:00-03:00 JST, September 19) at 26.5°N 127.9°E – Pulasan crosses Okinawa Island.
- 18:00 UTC at 17.5°N 110.0°E – The JMA upgrades 16W to a tropical storm, naming it Soulik, simultaneously peaking with 10-minute sustained winds of 35 knots (65 km/h; 40 mph) and a central pressure of 992 hPa (992.0 mbar; 29.29 inHg) as it moves south of Hainan.

September 19

- 00:00 UTC at 28.3°N 125.2°E – The JTWC reports Pulasan has slightly deepened to a central pressure of 989 hPa (989.0 mbar; 29.21 inHg) after entering the East China Sea.
- 06:00 UTC at 17.0°N 107.0°E – The JTWC upgrades Soulik into a tropical storm with 1-minute winds of 35 knots (65 km/h; 40 mph) and a central pressure of 989 hPa (989.0 mbar; 29.21 inHg) as it is about to make landfall in Vietnam.
- 07:00 UTC (02:00 ICT) at 17.1°N 107.0°E – Soulik hits Vĩnh Linh District, Quảng Trị.
- 10:50 UTC (18:50 CST) at 30.3°N 122.2°E – Pulasan makes another hit at Daishan County, Zhoushan, Zhejiang.
- 12:00 UTC
  - At 30.5°N 122.3°E – The JTWC downgrades Pulasan to a tropical depression while traversing Hangzhou Bay.
  - At 16.9°N 106.9°E – The JMA downgrades Soulik to a tropical depression after making landfall.
  - At 17.1°N 106.0°E – The JTWC also downgrades Soulik to a tropical depression as it moves further inland.
  - (20:00 PHT) at 20.4°N 128.8°E – The PAGASA reports a tropical depression has formed over the Philippine Sea northeast of Luzon, naming it Igme.
- 13:45 UTC (21:45 CST) at 30.9°N 121.6°E – Pulasan makes another landfall at Fengxian, Shanghai.
- 18:00 UTC
  - At 20.6°N 127.9°E – The JTWC starts tracking on Igme, designating it 17W.
  - At 17.2°N 104.9°E – The JTWC further downgrades Soulik to a tropical disturbance as it is about to cross over to Thailand.

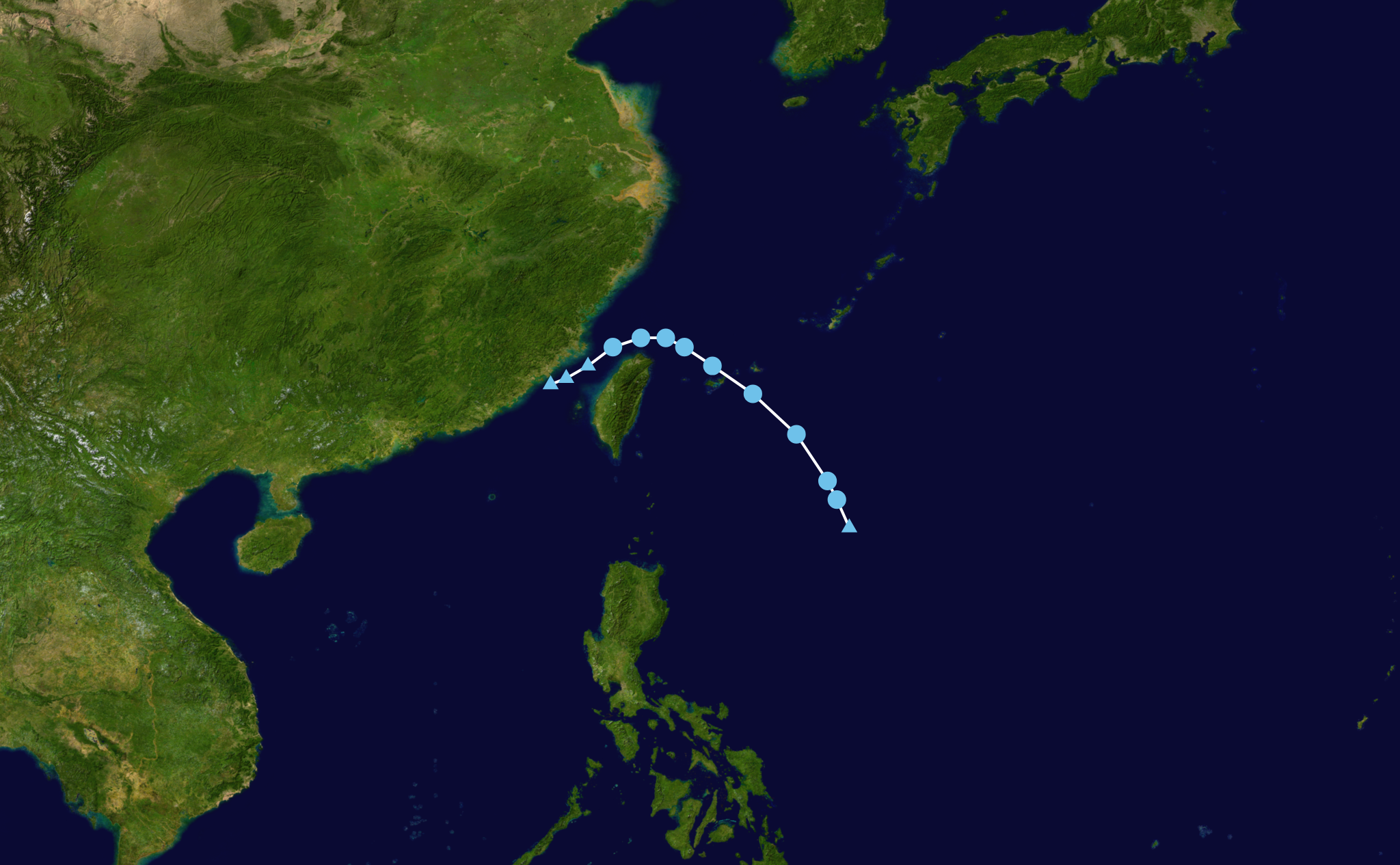
Track of 17W during late September.

September 20

- 00:00 UTC at 21.2°N 127.6°E – The JMA starts tracking on 17W (Igme) while the JTWC assesses the system has attained 1-minute winds of 30 knots (56 km/h; 35 mph).
- 06:00 UTC
  - At 32.6°N 120.5°E – The JTWC reports Pulasan has re-strengthened over Jiangsu Province, with 1-minute winds of 30 knots (56 km/h; 35 mph) while recurving to the northeast.
  - (14:00 PHT) at 22.7°N 126.6°E – The PAGASA reports 17W (Igme) has reached its peak with 10-minute sustained winds of 30 knots (56 km/h; 35 mph) and a central pressure of 1,002 hPa (1,002 mbar; 29.59 inHg) as it moves northwestwards.
- 12:00 UTC
  - At 23.9°N 125.4°E – The JTWC reports 17W (Igme) has deepened to a central pressure of 987 hPa (987.0 mbar; 29.15 inHg) as it approaches the Yaeyama Islands.
  - At 17.1°N 103.9°E – The JMA last notes Soulik as it deteriorates while moving over Thailand; the system dissipates six hour later.
- 18:00 UTC
  - At 33.2°N 122.3°E – The JMA reports Pulasan has reached a secondary peak with 10-minute winds of 40 knots (74 km/h; 46 mph) and a central pressure of 998 hPa (998.0 mbar; 29.47 inHg) while undergoing an extratropical transition over the Yellow Sea.
  - At 33.2°N 121.4°E – The JTWC reports Pulasan has also deepened to a central pressure of 979 hPa (979.0 mbar; 28.91 inHg) while moving east-northeastward.
  - At 24.8°N 123.9°E – The JMA assesses 17W (Igme) has deepened to a central pressure of 1,002 hPa (1,002 mbar; 29.59 inHg) as it enters the East China Sea.
- 18:30 UTC (02:30 PHT, September 21) – The PAGASA announces 17W (Igme) has exited the PAR.

September 21

- 00:00 UTC at 25.5°N 122.9°E – The JTWC assesses 17W has slightly deepened to a central pressure of 988 hPa (988.0 mbar; 29.18 inHg) as it maneuvers around Taiwan.
- 06:00 UTC at 33.9°N 125.3°E – The JMA assesses Pulasan has turned extratropical while nearing Korea.
- 12:00 UTC
  - At 25.9°N 121.6°E – The JTWC assesses the system has re-attained 1-minute winds of 30 knots (56 km/h; 35 mph) as it starts to move towards the Taiwan Strait.
  - At 34.6°N 128.3°E – The JTWC also reports Pulasan has turned extratropical while brushing the southern coastline of the Korean Peninsula and entering the Korea Strait.
- 18:00 UTC at 25.7°N 120.8°E – The JMA last notes 17W as it becomes embedded in a front six hours later. Meanwhile, the JTWC assesses the system has reached its minimum central pressure of 983 hPa (983.0 mbar; 29.03 inHg).

September 22

- 00:00 UTC at 25.3°N 120.1°E – The JTWC downgrades 17W to a tropical disturbance over the Taiwan Strait as it moves closer to the Chinese coast.

September 23

- 06:00 UTC at 29.1°N 129.3°E – The JMA reports a tropical depression has formed north of the Amami Islands.

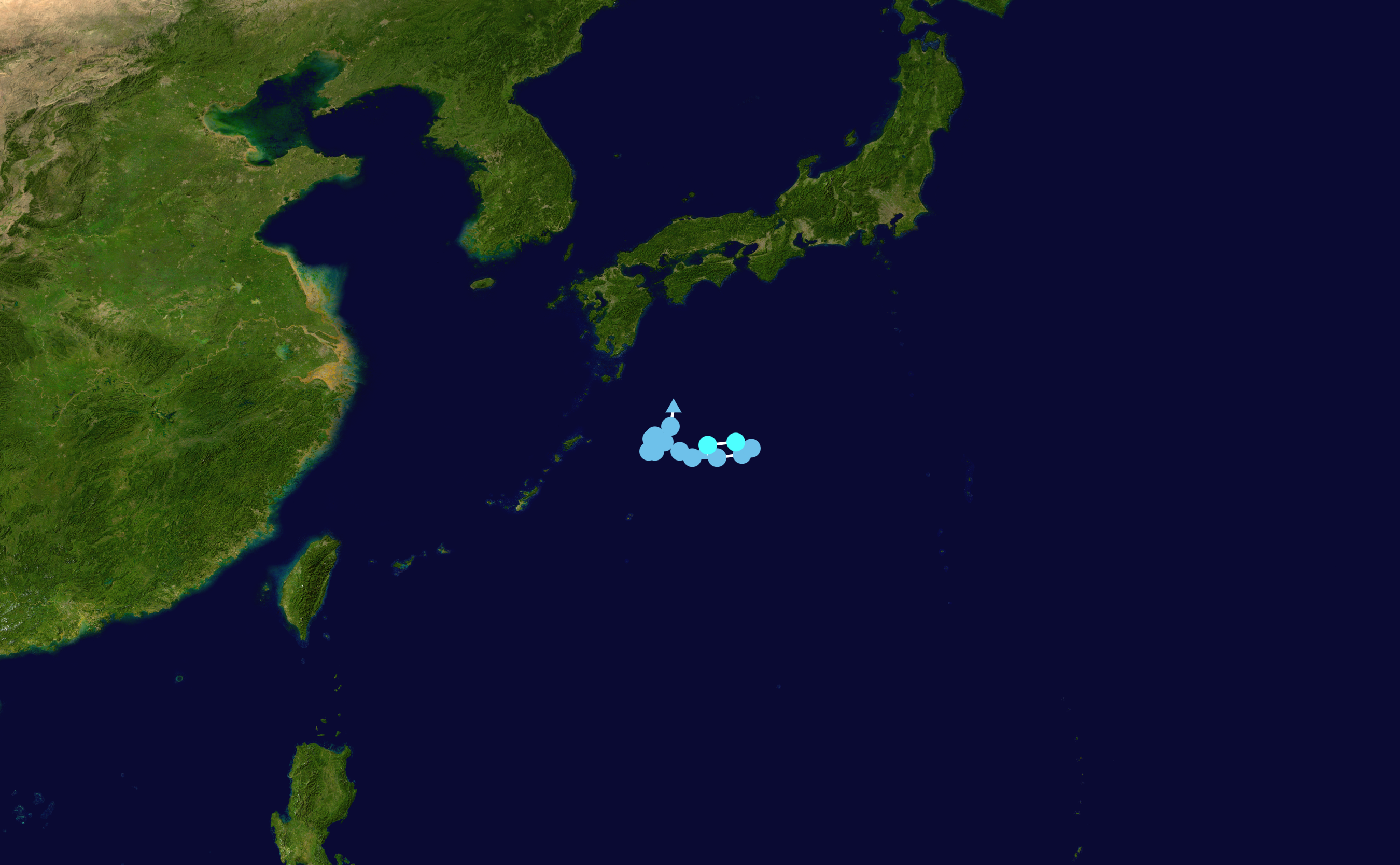
Track of Cimaron during late September.

September 24

- 06:00 UTC
  - At 27.8°N 134.2°E – The JMA upgrades the tropical depression to a tropical storm, naming it Cimaron, now located east of the Amami Islands, attaining 10-minute winds of 35 knots (65 km/h; 40 mph).
  - At 27.8°N 134.1°E – The JTWC starts tracking on Cimaron as a tropical depression.
- 12:00 UTC at 27.9°N 135.1°E – The JMA assesses Cimaron has also attained its lowest central pressure of 998 hPa (998.0 mbar; 29.47 inHg).
- 18:00 UTC at 46.1°N 177.3°W – The JMA last notes the extratropical remnants of Pulasan after it had crossed 180th meridian.

September 25

- 00:00 UTC at 28.3°N 134.7°E – Having done a U-turn to the west, the JTWC upgrades Cimaron to a tropical storm, peaking with 1-minute winds of 35 knots (65 km/h; 40 mph) and a central pressure of 997 hPa (997.0 mbar; 29.44 inHg).
- 06:00 UTC
  - At 15.7°N 149.1°E – The JTWC reports a tropical depression has formed east of the Mariana Islands, designating it 19W, with 1-minute winds of 25 knots (46 km/h; 29 mph) and a central pressure of 999 hPa (999.0 mbar; 29.50 inHg).
  - At 33.3°N 142.1°E – The JTWC also reports a subtropical storm, tagged 96W, has formed with 1-minute winds of 35 knots (65 km/h; 40 mph) southeast of Japan. The JMA assesses the system as an extratropical low.
- 12:00 UTC
  - At 16.2°N 148.3°E – The JTWC assesses 19W has transformed into a monsoon depression.
  - At 27.8°N 133.3°E – The JTWC reports Cimaron has weakened to a tropical depression as the system finishes a loop.
  - At 34.1°N 142.5°E – The JTWC assesses Subtropical Storm 96W has slightly deepened to a central pressure of 1,006 hPa (1,006 mbar; 29.71 inHg).
- 18:00 UTC at 14.8°N 148.9°E – The JMA starts tracking on 19W as it moves northwestward.

September 26

- 00:00 UTC at 14.1°N 136.7°E – The JMA starts tracking a tropical depression over the Philippine Sea west of Guam with a central pressure of 1,008 hPa (1,008 mbar; 29.77 inHg).
- 06:00 UTC
  - At 28.0°N 132.0°E – The JMA downgrades Cimaron to a tropical depression as it starts to turn to the northeast.
  - At 28.0°N 132.1°E – The JTWC assesses Cimaron has deepened further to a central pressure of 986 hPa (986.0 mbar; 29.12 inHg).
- 12:00 UTC
  - At 21.7°N 127.5°E – The JMA notes another tropical depression east of Taiwan.
  - (20:00 PHT) at 21.8°N 127.4°E – The PAGASA names the tropical depression southeast of Taiwan, Julian.
  - At 37.5°N 150.7°E – The JTWC reports 96W has fully turned into an extratropical system while moving east-northeastward away from Japan.
- 18:00 UTC
  - At 28.4°N 132.0°E – After a brief rise in central pressure, the JTWC reports Cimaron has attained its lowest central pressure of 985 hPa (985.0 mbar; 29.09 inHg) as it starts undergoing extratropical transition.
  - At 17.6°N 146.2°E – The JTWC reports 19W has developed into a tropical storm.
  - At 14.5°N 138.7°E – The JMA last notes the tropical depression west of Guam as it re-attains a central pressure of 1,008 hPa (1,008 mbar; 29.77 inHg); the system would dissipate at 00 UTC the next day.

September 27

- 00:00 UTC at 17.2°N 146.1°E – The JMA also upgrades 19W to a tropical storm, naming it Jebi.
- 06:00 UTC
  - At 18.3°N 145.2°E – The JTWC assesses Jebi has attained an initial peak with 1-minute winds of 40 knots (74 km/h; 46 mph) and a central pressure of 990 hPa (990.0 mbar; 29.23 inHg) as it starts to move away from the Marianas.
  - At 28.8°N 132.6°E – Cimaron re-attains its lowest central pressure of 985 hPa (985.0 mbar; 29.09 inHg), per the JTWC.
  - At 20.3°N 126.5°E – The JTWC starts tracking on Julian, designating it 20W with a central pressure of 994 hPa (994.0 mbar; 29.35 inHg) as it continues to dip southwestwards.
- 12:00 UTC at 29.4°N 132.7°E – The JTWC reports Cimaron has turned extratropical.
- 18:00 UTC at 31.0°N 133.5°E – The JMA also reports Cimaron has turned into an extratropical low as it turns to the east while moving south of Japan.

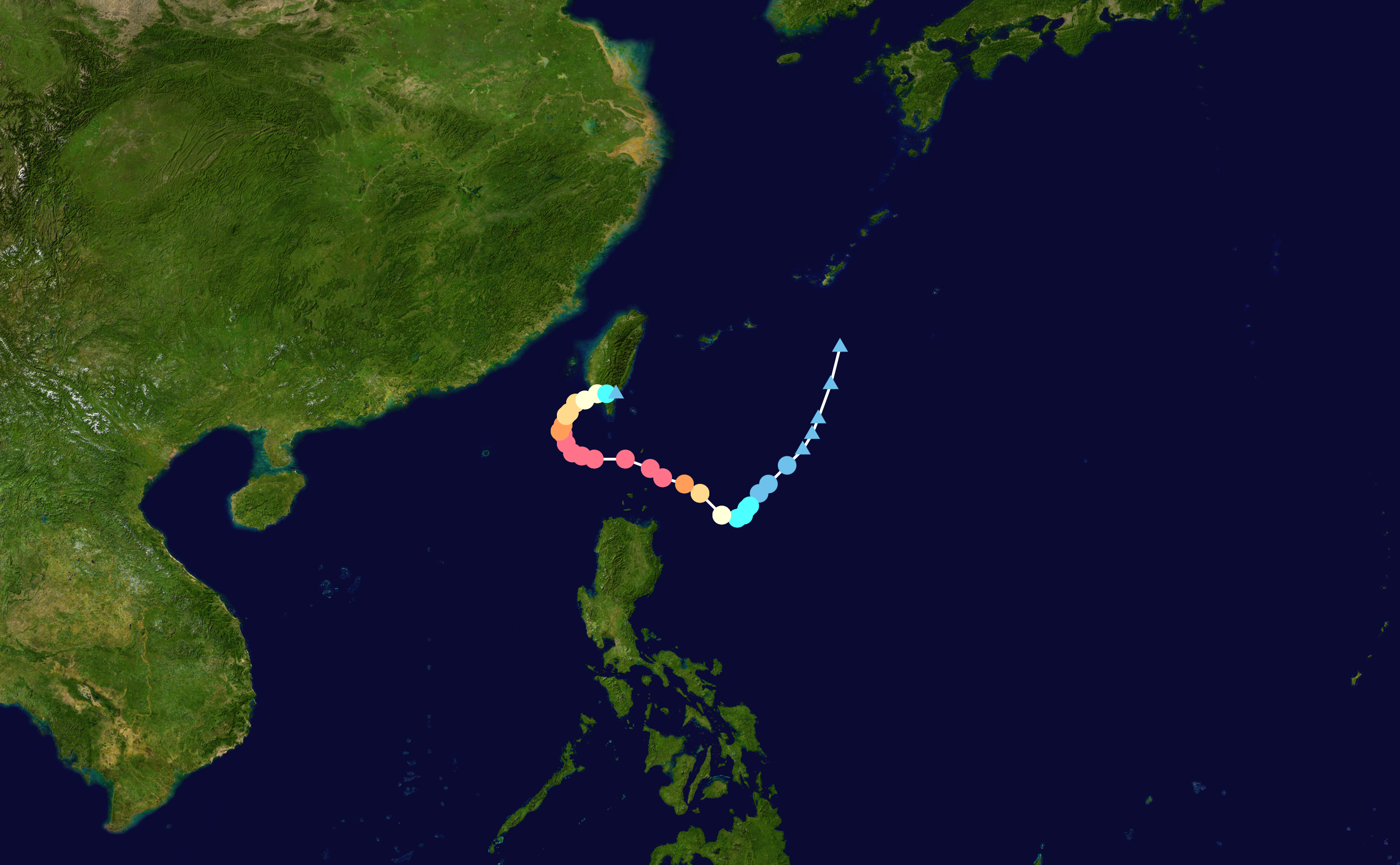
Track of Krathon during late September to early October.

September 28

- 00:00 UTC
  - (08:00 PHT) at 18.5°N 125.3°E – The JMA and PAGASA upgrade 20W (Julian) to a tropical storm, with the former naming it Krathon.
  - At 19.0°N 125.3°E – The JTWC also upgrades Krathon (Julian) to a tropical storm as it gradually turns to the west.
  - At 20.0°N 143.3°E – The JTWC analyzes Jebi has weakened to a tropical depression as it turns to the north-northwest.
- 12:00 UTC at 18.3°N 124.8°E – The JMA further upgrades Krathon (Julian) to a severe tropical storm.
- 18:00 UTC
  - (02:00 PHT, September 29) at 18.4°N 124.5°E – The PAGASA also upgrades Krathon (Julian) to a severe tropical storm as it slightly shifts to the west-northwest.
  - At 21.9°N 142.2°E – The JTWC re-upgrades Jebi to a tropical storm, attaining a second peak with 1-minute winds of 35 knots (65 km/h; 40 mph) and a central pressure of 990 hPa (990.0 mbar; 29.23 inHg) as it approaches the Ogasawara Islands.

September 29

- 00:00 UTC
  - At 18.7°N 124.4°E – The JTWC reports Krathon (Julian) has commenced its rapid intensification and is now a Category 1 typhoon.
  - (08:00 PHT) at 18.7°N 124.3°E – The PAGASA upgrades Krathon (Julian) further to a typhoon.
  - At 22.6°N 141.5°E – The JTWC downgrades Jebi once again to a tropical depression as it moves north-northwestward.
- 06:00 UTC
  - At 19.3°N 123.8°E – The JMA analyzes that Krathon (Julian) has reached typhoon strength as it gradually accelerates.
  - At 19.4°N 123.7°E – The JTWC upgrades Krathon (Julian) to a Category 2 typhoon as it continues to intensify.
- 12:00 UTC
  - At 19.7°N 123.2°E – The JTWC further upgrades Krathon (Julian) to a Category 3 typhoon as it approaches the Luzon Strait.
  - At 24.6°N 140.7°E – The JTWC assesses Jebi has re-intensified to a tropical storm, re-attaining a central pressure of 990 hPa (990.0 mbar; 29.23 inHg) as it passes to the west of the Volcano Islands.
- 18:00 UTC
  - At 19.9°N 122.5°E – Krathon (Julian) becomes a Category 4 typhoon as it enters the Balintang Channel and approaches the Batanes Islands.
  - At 25.1°N 140.4°E – The JTWC analyzes Jebi has re-attained 1-minute sustained winds of 40 knots (74 km/h; 46 mph).

September 30

- 00:00 UTC at 25.9°N 140.2°E – The JTWC re-downgrades Jebi to a tropical depression as it turns to the northeast.
- 06:00 UTC
  - At 32.3°N 138.5°E – The JMA last notes the extratropical remnants of Cimaron as it dissipates six hours later south of Japan.
  - At 27.7°N 140.5°E – The JTWC determines Jebi has regained tropical storm status after passing to the west of Nishinoshima.
- 12:00 UTC at 29.3°N 140.9°E – The JMA reports Jebi has intensified to a severe tropical storm.
- 18:00 UTC
  - At 20.6°N 119.9°E – The JTWC assesses Krathon (Julian) has strengthened further into a Category 4 super typhoon, peaking with 1-minute maximum sustained winds of 135 knots (250 km/h; 155 mph) and a central pressure of 922 hPa (922.0 mbar; 27.23 inHg) as it enters the South China Sea.
  - (02:00 PHT, October 1) at 20.6°N 120.0°E – The PAGASA upgrades Krathon (Julian) to a super typhoon as it decelerates.

=== October ===
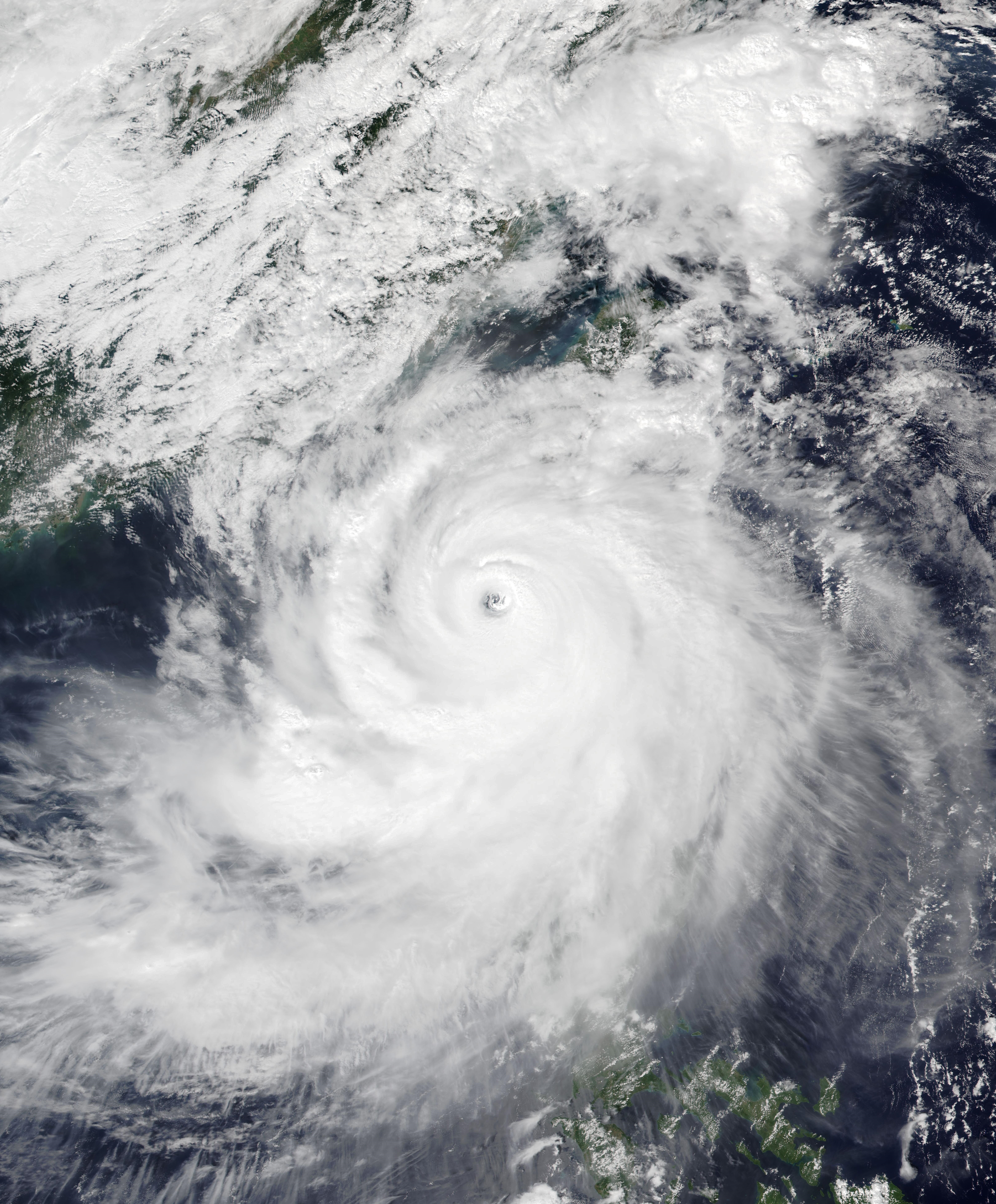
Krathon at its peak intensity over Luzon Strait on October 1.

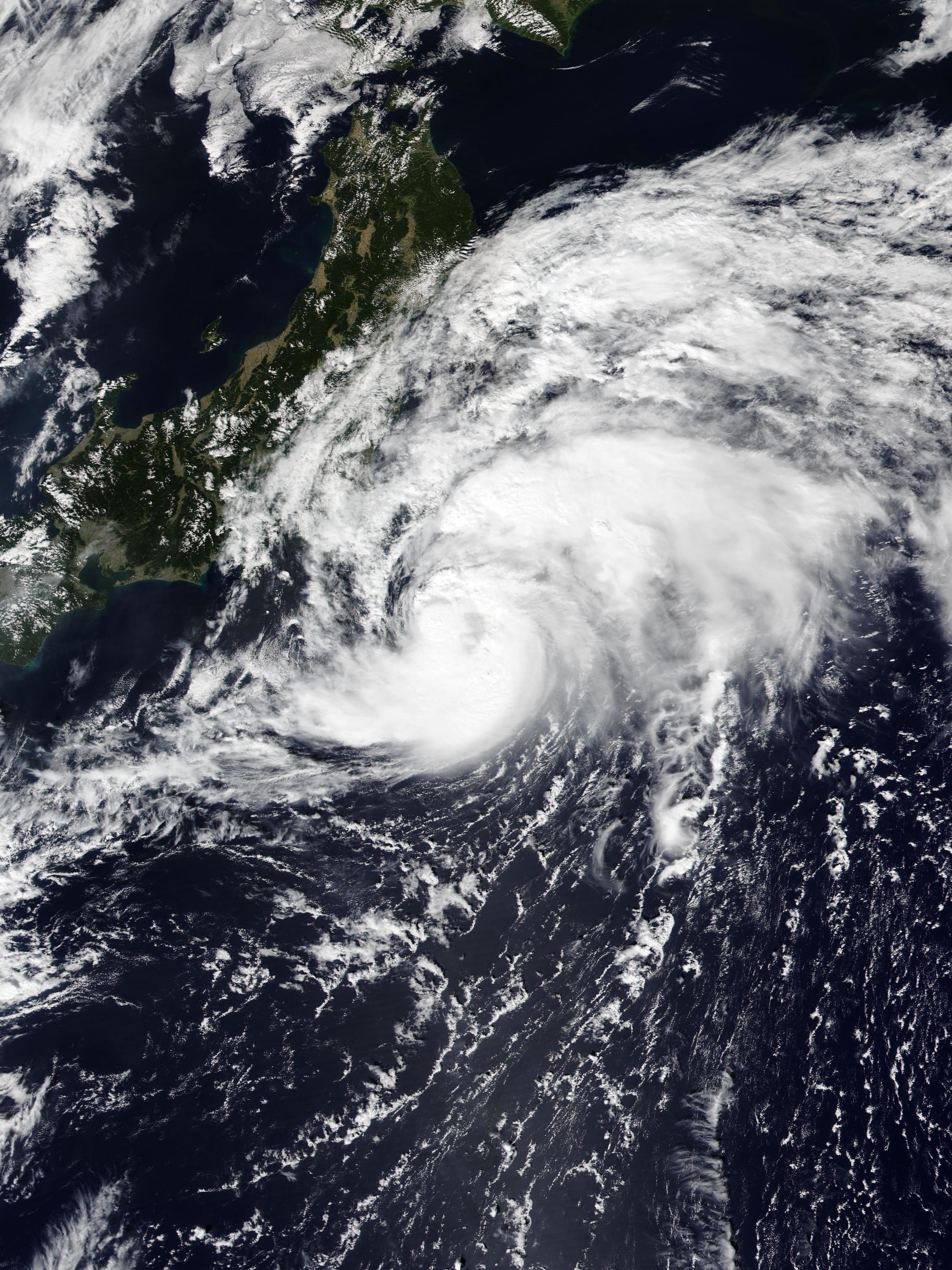
Jebi at its peak intensity southeast of Japan on October 1.

October 1

- 00:00 UTC
  - (08:00 PHT) at 20.6°N 119.6°E – Both the JMA and PAGASA reports Krathon (Julian) has attained its peak with 10-minute winds of 105 knots (194 km/h; 121 mph) and a central pressure of 920 hPa (920.0 mbar; 27.17 inHg) as it slowly turns northwestward.
  - At 32.6°N 141.7°E – The JMA upgrades Jebi further to a typhoon, attaining its peak intensity with 10-minute winds of 65 knots (120 km/h; 75 mph) and a central pressure of 980 hPa (980.0 mbar; 28.94 inHg).
  - At 32.8°N 141.6°E – The JTWC follows suit, upgrading Jebi to a Category 1 typhoon as it makes its closest approach to Japan.
- 00:20 UTC (08:20 PHT) – The PAGASA reports Krathon (Julian) has temporarily left the PAR.
- 06:00 UTC at 21.0°N 119.4°E – The JTWC assesses that Krathon has started to weaken and is now a Category 4 typhoon.
- 12:00 UTC at 37.0°N 143.0°E – The JTWC assesses Jebi has reached its peak 1-minute winds of 70 knots (130 km/h; 81 mph) as it accelerates northeastward.
- 18:00 UTC at 21.4°N 119.2°E – Typhoon Krathon weakens further to a Category 3 typhoon as it starts to turn to the northeast.

October 2

- 00:00 UTC
  - At 41.9°N 148.8°E – The JMA reports Jebi has weakened to a severe tropical storm as it undergoes extratropical transition.
  - At 42.1°N 148.3°E – The JTWC assesses Jebi has attained its lowest central pressure of 969 hPa (969.0 mbar; 28.61 inHg).
- 06:00 UTC
  - At 21.9°N 119.4°E – The JTWC downgrades Krathon further to a Category 2 typhoon as it slowly closes in on Taiwan.
  - At 45.1°N 152.3°E – The JTWC reports Jebi has turned extratropical near the Kuril Islands.
- 12:00 UTC at 49.0°N 157.0°E – The JMA reports Jebi has transitioned into an extratropical system south of the Kamchatka Peninsula.
- 18:00 UTC at 51.7°N 162.2°E – The JMA last notes the extratropical remnants of Jebi as it dissipates early the next day.

Radar imagery of Krathon making landfall in Taiwan on October 3.

October 3

- 00:00 UTC (08:00 PHT) at 22.4°N 120.0°E – The JMA and JTWC downgrades Krathon to a severe tropical storm and Category 1 typhoon, respectively, as the PAGASA reports the system has re-entered the PAR and is about to make landfall.
- 04:40 UTC (12:40 TST) at 22.6°N 120.4°E – Krathon (Julian) makes landfall at SIaogang District, Kaohsiung City.
- 06:00 UTC (14:00 PHT) at 22.6°N 120.4°E – The PAGASA downgrades Krathon (Julian) to a severe tropical storm upon making landfall.
- 12:00 UTC
  - (20:00 PHT) at 22.8°N 120.6°E – The JMA and PAGASA downgrades Krathon (Julian) to a tropical depression, with the former last noting it as it dissipates six hours later.
  - At 22.6°N 120.7°E – The JTWC downgrades Krathon (Julian) further to a tropical storm as it rapidly deteriorates overland.
- 18:00 UTC at 22.6°N 121.0°E – The JTWC stops tracking Krathon (Julian) as it weakens to a tropical disturbance and is about to emerge over the Philippine Sea.

October 4

- 00:00 UTC (08:00 PHT) at 22.1°N 120.2°E – The PAGASA reports Krathon (Julian) has weakened to a remnant low after emerging over the Luzon Strait.
- 18:00 UTC at 11.6°N 148.2°E – The JMA reports a tropical depression has formed southeast of Guam.

October 5

- 00:00 UTC at 12.8°N 147.3°E – The JTWC starts tracking on the tropical depression southeast of Guam, designating it 21W.
- 06:00 UTC at 13.2°N 147.1°E – The JMA assesses 21W has slightly deepened to a central pressure of 1,004 hPa (1,004 mbar; 29.65 inHg) as it moves north-northwestward.
- 12:00 UTC at 14.0°N 147.0°E – The JTWC also assesses 21W has slightly deepened to a central pressure of 1,004 hPa (1,004 mbar; 29.65 inHg) after passing to the east of Guam and approaches the Northern Mariana Islands.

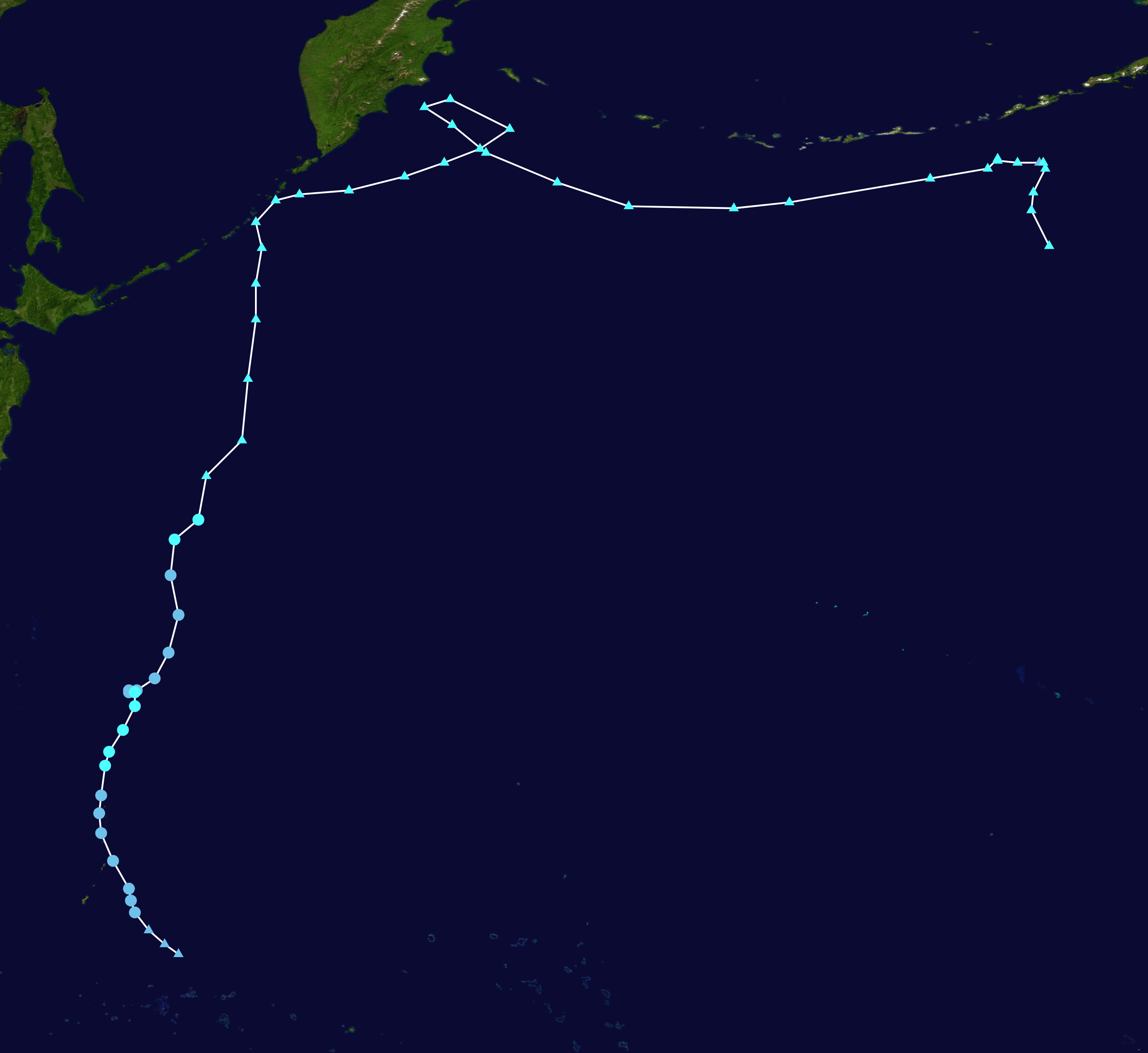
Track of Barijat during early October.

October 6

- 06:00 UTC at 17.8°N 145.2°E – The JMA upgrades 21W to a tropical storm, naming it Barijat as it moves around the NMI.
- 18:00 UTC at 20.2°N 145.8°E – The JTWC also reports Barijat has strengthened into a tropical storm as it moves away from the NMI.

October 7

- 06:00 UTC at 22.0°N 146.7°E – The JTWC analyzes Barijat has attained its peak with 1-minute winds of 45 knots (83 km/h; 52 mph) and a central pressure of 988 hPa (988.0 mbar; 29.18 inHg).

October 8

- 00:00 UTC at 24.0°N 147.0°E – The JTWC assesses Barijat has weakened to a tropical depression as it slowly makes a counter-clockwise loop.

October 9

- 18:00 UTC at 31.6°N 149.3°E – The JTWC re-upgrades Barijat to a tropical storm, simultaneously attaining a secondary peak with 1-minute winds of 35 knots (65 km/h; 40 mph) and a central pressure of 991 hPa (991.0 mbar; 29.26 inHg) well southeast of Japan.

October 10

- 06:00 UTC at 34.8°N 150.9°E – The JTWC determines Barijat has transitioned into an extratropical cyclone as it continues to move northeastward.
- 18:00 UTC at 39.2°N 154.2°E – The JMA analyzes Barijat has attained its peak with 10-minute winds of 45 knots (83 km/h; 52 mph) and a central pressure of 985 hPa (985.0 mbar; 29.09 inHg) as it transitions to an extratropical low well east of Japan.

October 11

- 00:00 UTC at 42.0°N 154.0°E – The JMA analyzes that Barijat has completed its extratropical transition east of Hokkaido.

October 12

- 18:00 UTC at 27.4°N 153.0°E – A tropical depression forms northwest of Minamitorishima.

October 13

- 06:00 UTC at 28.3°N 152.9°E – The JTWC reports the tropical depression northwest of Minamitorishima, which had been tagged as Invest 92W, has transformed into a subtropical depression with a central pressure of 1,006 hPa (1,006 mbar; 29.71 inHg).
- 18:00 UTC at 30.2°N 153.6°E – The JMA assesses 92W has reached its lowest central pressure of 1,006 hPa (1,006 mbar; 29.71 inHg).

October 14

- 00:00 UTC at 31.2°N 155.3°E – The JTWC reports 92W has intensified into a subtropical storm as it starts to merge with a front.
- 06:00 UTC at 32.4°N 157.2°E – The JMA assesses 92W has transitioned into an extratropical low while the JTWC reports the system has attained its maximum 1-minute winds of 45 knots (83 km/h; 52 mph) well southeast of Japan.
- 12:00 UTC at 32.5°N 159.0°E – The JTWC reports 92W had deepened to a central pressure of 1,002 hPa (1,002 mbar; 29.59 inHg) while moving east-northeastward.

October 15

- 00:00 UTC at 33.1°N 162.5°E – The JTWC reports 92W has fully acquired extratropical characteristics as it moves east-northeastward over the Pacific Ocean.
- 12:00 UTC at 48.6°N 179.6°W – The JMA last notes Barijat after its extratropical remnants had crossed the 180th meridian south of the Aleutian Islands.

October 18

- 12:00 UTC at 13.2°N 141.0°E – The JMA marks a tropical depression west of Guam.
- 18:00 UTC at 13.5°N 139.9°E – The JMA assesses the tropical depression west of Guam has slightly deepened to a central pressure of 1,006 hPa (1,006 mbar; 29.71 inHg).

October 19

- 06:00 UTC at 13.8°N 138.9°E – The JMA reports the tropical depression west of Guam has attained a central pressure of 1,004 hPa (1,004 mbar; 29.65 inHg) as it turns west-southwestward.

October 20

- 15:00 UTC (23:00 PHT) – The PAGASA reports the tropical depression west of Guam had entered the PAR, naming it Kristine.

October 21

- 00:00 UTC at 13.1°N 129.8°E – The JTWC starts tracking Kristine, designating it 22W as it decelerates.
- 18:00 UTC (02:00 PHT, October 22) at 13.2°N 128.3°E – Both the JMA and PAGASA upgrade 22W (Kristine) to a tropical storm, with the former naming the system, Trami, as the system turns northwestward.

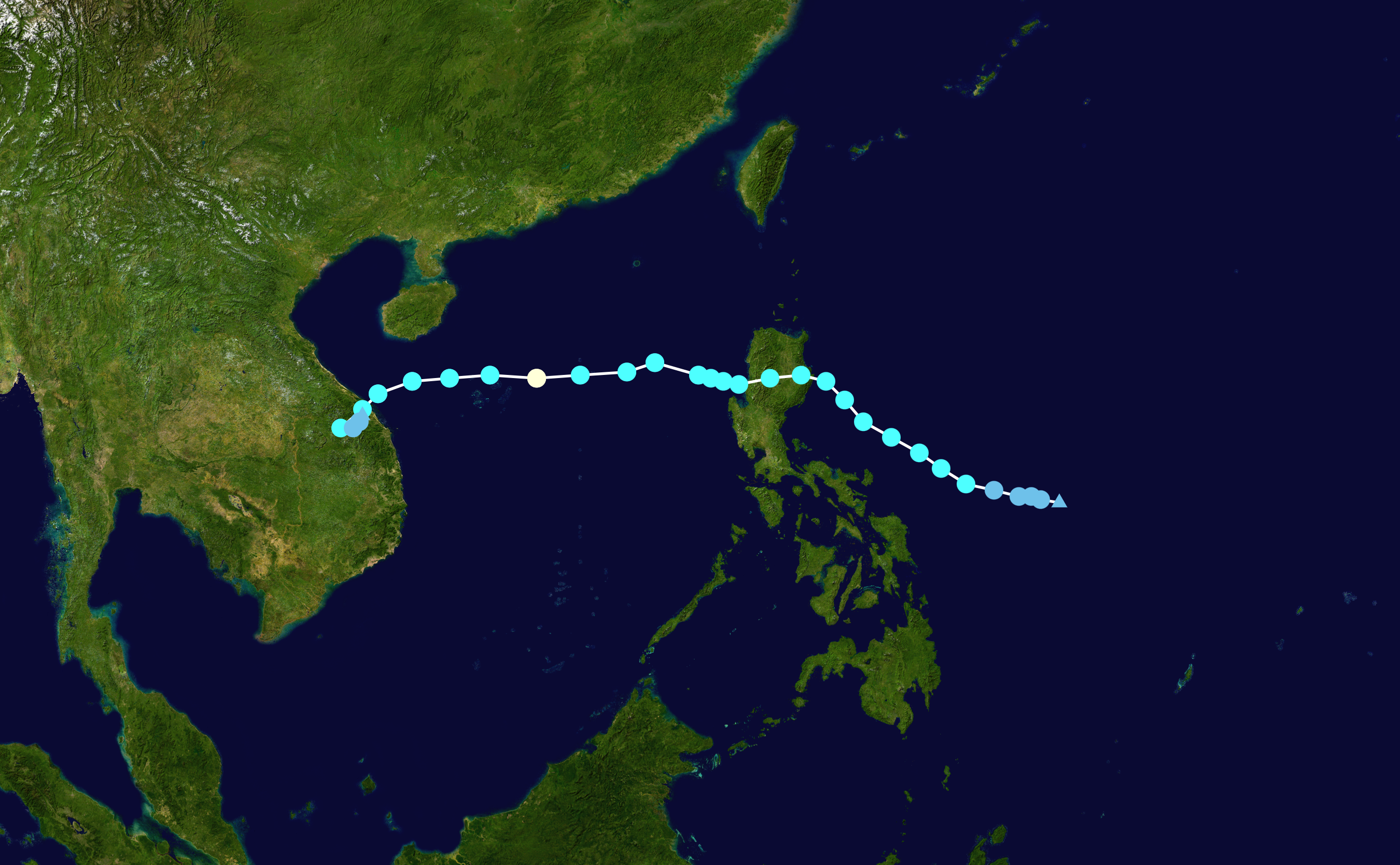
Track of Trami during late October.

October 22

- 00:00 UTC at 13.6°N 127.4°E – The JTWC also upgrades Trami (Kristine) to a tropical storm.
- 12:00 UTC at 14.6°N 125.9°E – The JTWC assesses Trami (Kristine) has attained 1-minute winds of 50 knots (93 km/h; 58 mph) as it continues to move northwestward east of Catanduanes.
- 18:00 UTC at 15.1°N 125.0°E – The JTWC assesses Trami (Kristine) has attained a central pressure of 986 hPa (986.0 mbar; 29.12 inHg), completing its initial peak.

October 23

- 00:00 UTC at 15.6°N 124.4°E – The JMA reports Trami (Kristine) has intensified into a severe tropical storm as it approaches Luzon.
- 06:00 UTC (14:00 PHT) at 16.4°N 123.5°E – The PAGASA upgrades Trami (Kristine) to a severe tropical storm.
- 16:30 UTC (00:30 PHT, October 24) at 17.3°N 122.3°E – Trami (Kristine) hits Divilacan, Isabela.
- 18:00 UTC at 17.1°N 122.1°E – The JTWC assesses Trami (Kristine) has attained a second peak with 1-minute winds of 45 knots (83 km/h; 52 mph) and a central pressure of 989 hPa (989.0 mbar; 29.21 inHg) upon making landfall.

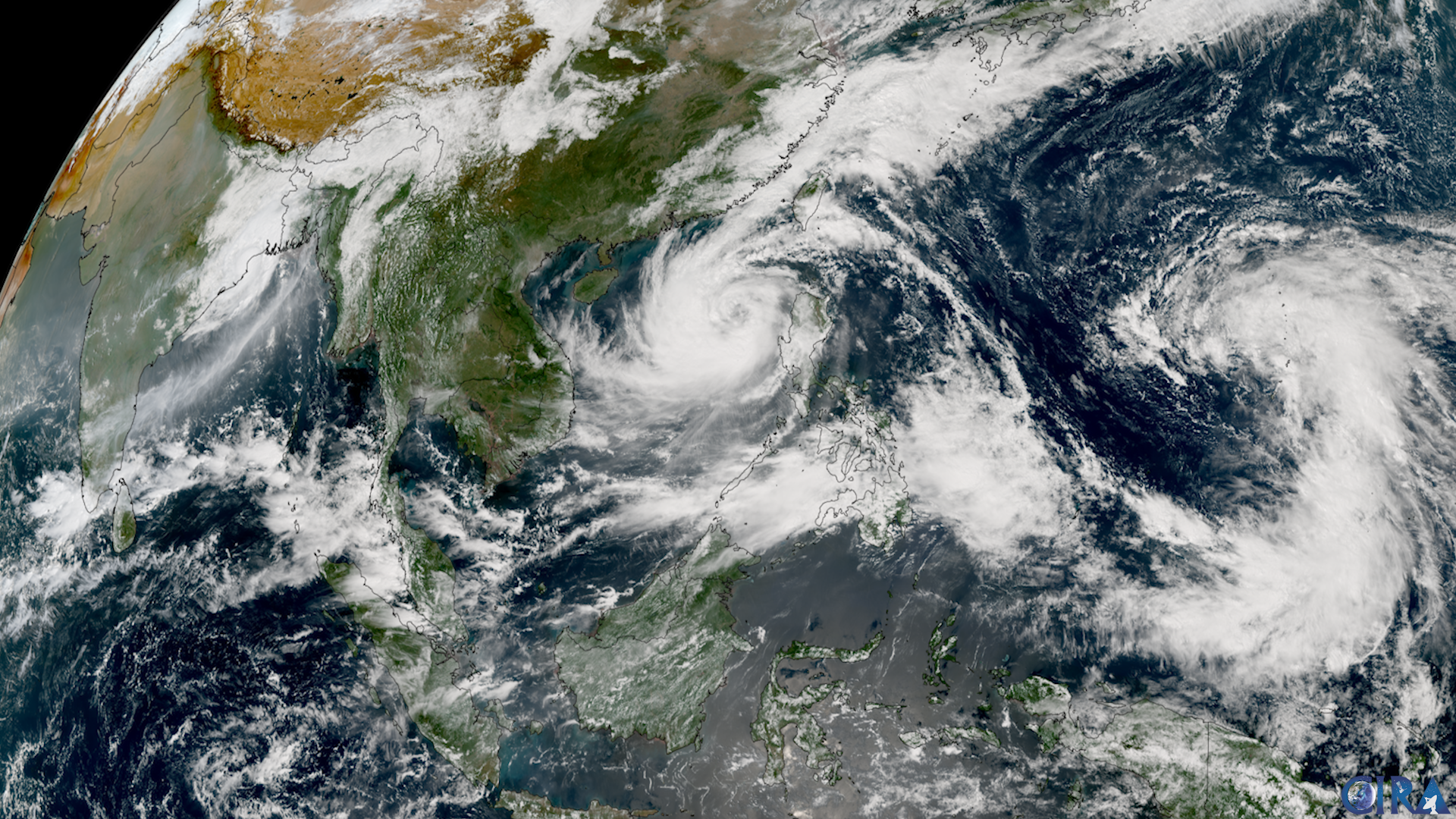
Three tropical cyclones simultaneously active on October 25: Dana (left-most) on the North Indian Ocean basin, making landfall on Odisha, Trami (center) moving over the South China Sea, and Kong-rey (right), which had recently formed over the Philippine Sea.

October 24

- 00:00 UTC at 12.7°N 150.1°E – Another tropical depression forms east of Guam.
- 18:00 UTC at 13.5°N 145.7°E – The JMA upgrades the tropical depression east of Guam into a tropical storm, naming it Kong-rey as it nears the island.

October 25

- 00:00 UTC at 13.7°N 145.4°E – The JTWC starts tracking Kong-rey, designating it 23W as it makes its closest approach to Guam.
- 06:00 UTC (14:00 PHT) at 17.8°N 117.0°E – Now over the South China Sea, the PAGASA assesses Trami (Kristine) has achieved its within-PAR peak with 10-minute winds of 55 knots (102 km/h; 63 mph) and a central pressure of 980 hPa (980.0 mbar; 28.94 inHg) as it is about to leave their monitoring area.
- 07:00 UTC (15:00 PHT) – The PAGASA reports Trami (Kristine) has left the PAR.
- 12:00 UTC at 15.4°N 141.0°E – The JTWC upgrades Kong-rey to a tropical storm with a central pressure of 997 hPa (997.0 mbar; 29.44 inHg).

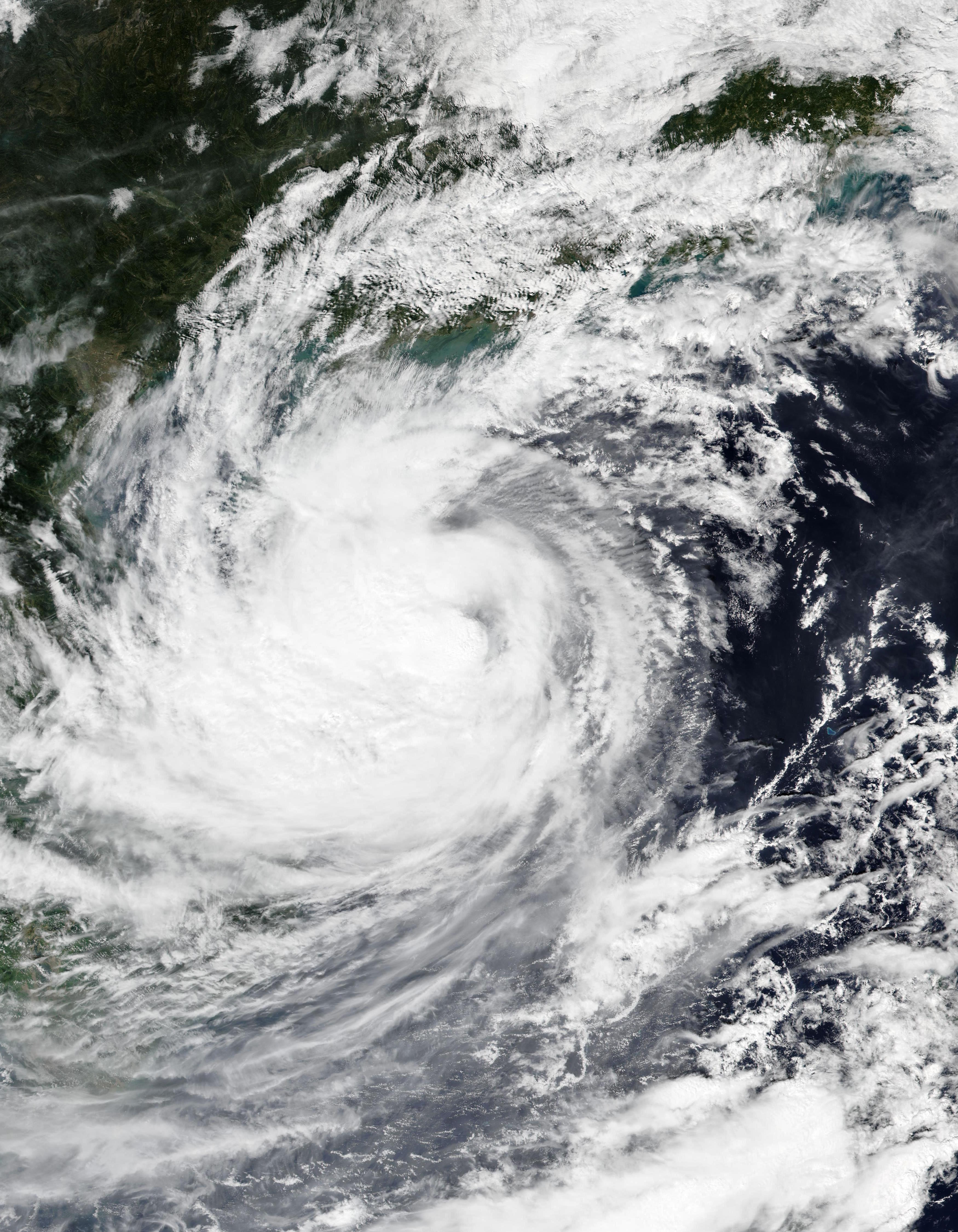
Trami near its peak intensity while moving over the South China Sea on October 26.

October 26

- 00:00 UTC at 17.0°N 113.6°E – The JTWC assesses Trami has strengthened into a Category 1 typhoon, attaining a third and best peak with 1-minute winds of 65 knots (120 km/h; 75 mph) and a central pressure of 984 hPa (984.0 mbar; 29.06 inHg) as it nears the Paracel Islands.
- 06:00 UTC
  - At 17.1°N 111.9°E – The JMA assesses Trami has reached its peak intensity with 10-minute winds of 60 knots (110 km/h; 69 mph) and a central pressure of 970 hPa (970.0 mbar; 28.64 inHg) as it moves westward.
  - At 17.1°N 112.1°E – The JTWC assesses Trami has weakened back into a tropical storm as it moves north of the Paracel Islands.
  - At 16.6°N 136.6°E – The JTWC assesses Kong-rey has further deepened to a central pressure of 989 hPa (989.0 mbar; 29.21 inHg) as it moves westward over the Philippine Sea.
- 12:00 UTC at 16.7°N 135.6°E – The JTWC downgrades Kong-rey to a tropical depression as it is about to enter the PAR.
- 16:00 UTC (00:00 PHT, October 27) – The PAGASA reports Kong-rey had entered the PAR, naming it Leon.
- 18:00 UTC at 16.7°N 134.3°E – The JTWC reports Kong-rey (Leon) has re-intensified to a tropical storm as it gradually decelerates.

October 27

- 00:00 UTC
  - At 16.8°N 108.6°E – The JMA downgrades Trami to a tropical storm as it now moves southwestward.
  - At 16.5°N 108.5°E – The JTWC assesses Trami has slightly re-intensified, reaching a fourth peak with 1-minute winds of 55 knots (102 km/h; 63 mph) and a central pressure of 987 hPa (987.0 mbar; 29.15 inHg) as it is about to hit Vietnam.
- 03:00 UTC (10:00 ICT) – Trami makes landfall near Thừa Thiên Huế-Đà Nẵng area.
- 12:00 UTC at 16.1°N 131.1°E – The JMA upgrades Kong-rey (Leon) to a severe tropical storm as it slightly shifts northwestward.
- 18:00 UTC
  - At 15.4°N 107.8°E – After making a U-turn near the Vietnam-Laos border, the JMA downgrades Trami further to a tropical depression.
  - At 15.4°N 107.7°E – The JTWC assesses Trami has weakened further into a tropical depression as it now moves to the northeast.

October 28

- 00:00 UTC (08:00 PHT) at 16.8°N 129.6°E – The PAGASA also upgrades Kong-rey (Leon) to a severe tropical storm.
- 06:00 UTC
  - At 15.7°N 108.2°E – The JMA assesses Trami has slightly deepened to a central pressure of 1,002 hPa (1,002 mbar; 29.59 inHg).
  - At 15.8°N 108.0°E – The JTWC downgrades Trami to a tropical disturbance as it is about to emerge back over the South China Sea.
- 12:00 UTC at 16.6°N 128.5°E – The JTWC reports Kong-rey (Leon) has further intensified to a Category 1 typhoon.
- 18:00 UTC (02:00 PHT, October 29) at 17.2°N 128.0°E – The JMA and PAGASA also upgrade Kong-rey (Leon) to a typhoon as it continues moving northwestward.

October 29

- 06:00 UTC at 17.9°N 126.6°E – Typhoon Kong-rey (Leon) quickly intensifies to a Category 3 typhoon, per the JTWC.
- 12:00 UTC
  - At 18.5°N 126.0°E – The JTWC upgrades Kong-rey (Leon) further to a Category 4 typhoon while moving northwestward.
  - At 16.9°N 109.5°E – The JMA last notes Trami despite re-emerging back over water; the system fully dissipates six hours later.
- 18:00 UTC at 18.9°N 125.4°E – The JTWC assesses Kong-rey (Leon) has further strengthened to a super typhoon, reaching its lowest central pressure of 915 hPa (915.0 mbar; 27.02 inHg).

Kong-rey at its peak intensity while approaching Taiwan on October 30.

October 30

- 00:00 UTC
  - (08:00 PHT) at 19.1°N 124.8°E – Now northeast of Luzon, both the JMA and PAGASA reports Kong-rey (Leon) has attained its peak with 10-minute winds of 100 knots (190 km/h; 120 mph) and a central pressure of 925 hPa (925.0 mbar; 27.32 inHg) as it enters Luzon Strait.
  - At 19.2°N 124.9°E – The JTWC upgrades Kong-rey (Leon) further to a Category 5 super typhoon, simultaneously attaining its peak 1-minute winds of 140 knots (260 km/h; 160 mph).
- 06:00 UTC at 19.8°N 124.2°E – After attaining its peak, Kong-rey (Leon) weakens to a Category 4 high-end typhoon.
- 15:00 UTC (23:00 PHT) – The PAGASA downgrades Kong-rey (Leon) to a typhoon as it makes its closest approach to Batanes.

Kong-rey making landfall in Taiwan on October 31.

October 31

- 00:00 UTC at 22.0°N 122.1°E – The JTWC assesses Kong-rey (Leon) has weakened further to a Category 3 typhoon as it nears Taiwan.
- 05:40 UTC (13:40 TST) at 23.1°N 121.4°E – Kong-rey (Leon) hits Chenggong Township, Taitung County.
- 12:00 UTC
  - (20:00 PHT) at 24.1°N 120.2°E – After rapidly crossing Taiwan and emerging over the Taiwan Strait, the JMA and PAGASA reports Kong-rey (Leon) has weakened to a severe tropical storm.
  - At 24.0°N 120.2°E – The JTWC downgrades Kong-rey (Leon) further to a Category 1 typhoon as it slowly recurves to the northeast.
- 18:00 UTC
  - At 25.0°N 120.2°E – The JMA reports Kong-rey (Leon) has weakened further to a tropical storm.
  - At 25.3°N 120.0°E – The JTWC also downgrades Kong-rey (Leon) to a tropical storm as it accelerates.
- 19:00 UTC (03:00 PHT, November 1) – The PAGASA reports Severe Tropical Storm Kong-rey (Leon) has exited the PAR as it moves northeastward.

=== November ===
November 1

- 00:00 UTC at 26.6°N 120.6°E – The JTWC assesses Kong-rey has briefly re-strengthened to a high-end tropical storm with 1-minute sustained winds of 60 knots (110 km/h; 69 mph) as it grazes the eastern Chinese coast.
- 12:00 UTC at 30.1°N 123.4°E – The JMA determines Kong-rey has transitioned into an extratropical low as it moves over the East China Sea.

November 2

- 00:00 UTC at 31.0°N 128.0°E – The JMA last notes the extratropical remnants of Kong-rey, dissipating six hours later southwest of Kyushu.
- 18:00 UTC at 8.2°N 140.0°E – The JMA marks a tropical depression southeast of Yap.

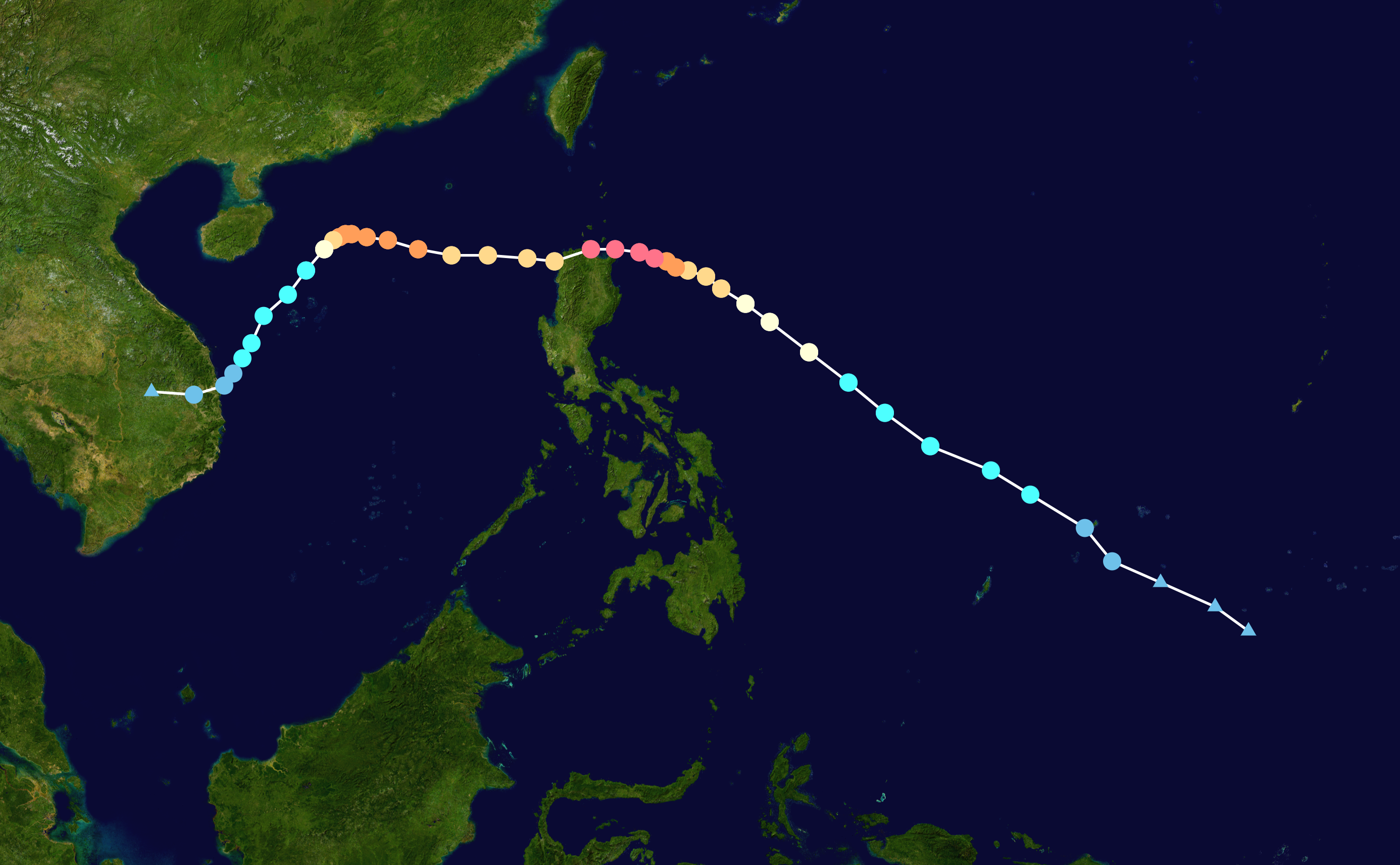
Track of Yinxing during early-mid November.

November 3

- 00:00 UTC at 8.3°N 138.7°E – The JTWC starts tracking the tropical depression southeast of Yap, designating it 24W.
- 12:00 UTC
  - At 11.0°N 136.1°E – The JMA upgrades 24W to a tropical storm, naming it Yinxing as it moves northwestward.
  - At 10.5°N 136.0°E – The JTWC also upgrades Yinxing to a tropical storm as it is about to enter the PAR.
- 17:00 UTC (01:00 PHT, November 4) – The PAGASA reports Yinxing has entered the PAR, designating the system Marce.

November 4

- 00:00 UTC (08:00 PHT) at 12.1°N 132.8°E – The PAGASA determines Yinxing (Marce) has intensified to a severe tropical storm as it steadily moves northwestward.
- 06:00 UTC (14:00 PHT) at 12.9°N 131.4°E – The PAGASA further upgrades Yinxing (Marce) to a typhoon while moving over the Philippine Sea.
- 12:00 UTC at 14.1°N 130.3°E – The JMA also upgrades Yinxing (Marce) to a severe tropical storm.
- 18:00 UTC
  - At 15.3°N 128.9°E – The JMA further upgrades Yinxing (Marce) to a typhoon as it moves east of Luzon.
  - At 15.2°N 128.7°E – The JTWC also upgrades Yinxing (Marce) to a Category 1 typhoon.

November 5

- 12:00 UTC at 17.3°N 125.8°E – The JTWC further upgrades Yinxing (Marce) to a Category 2 typhoon as it slows down.

November 6

- 06:00 UTC at 18.0°N 124.3°E – The JTWC assesses Yinxing (Marce) had strengthened to a Category 3 typhoon as it slowly moves west-northwestward.
- 09:00 UTC (17:00 PHT) – The PAGASA assesses Yinxing (Marce) had attained its peak with 10-minute sustained winds of 95 knots (176 km/h; 109 mph) and a central pressure of 945 hPa (945.0 mbar; 27.91 inHg).
- 18:00 UTC at 18.3°N 123.6°E – Typhoon Yinxing (Marce) further intensifies to a Category 4 typhoon as it nears Luzon.

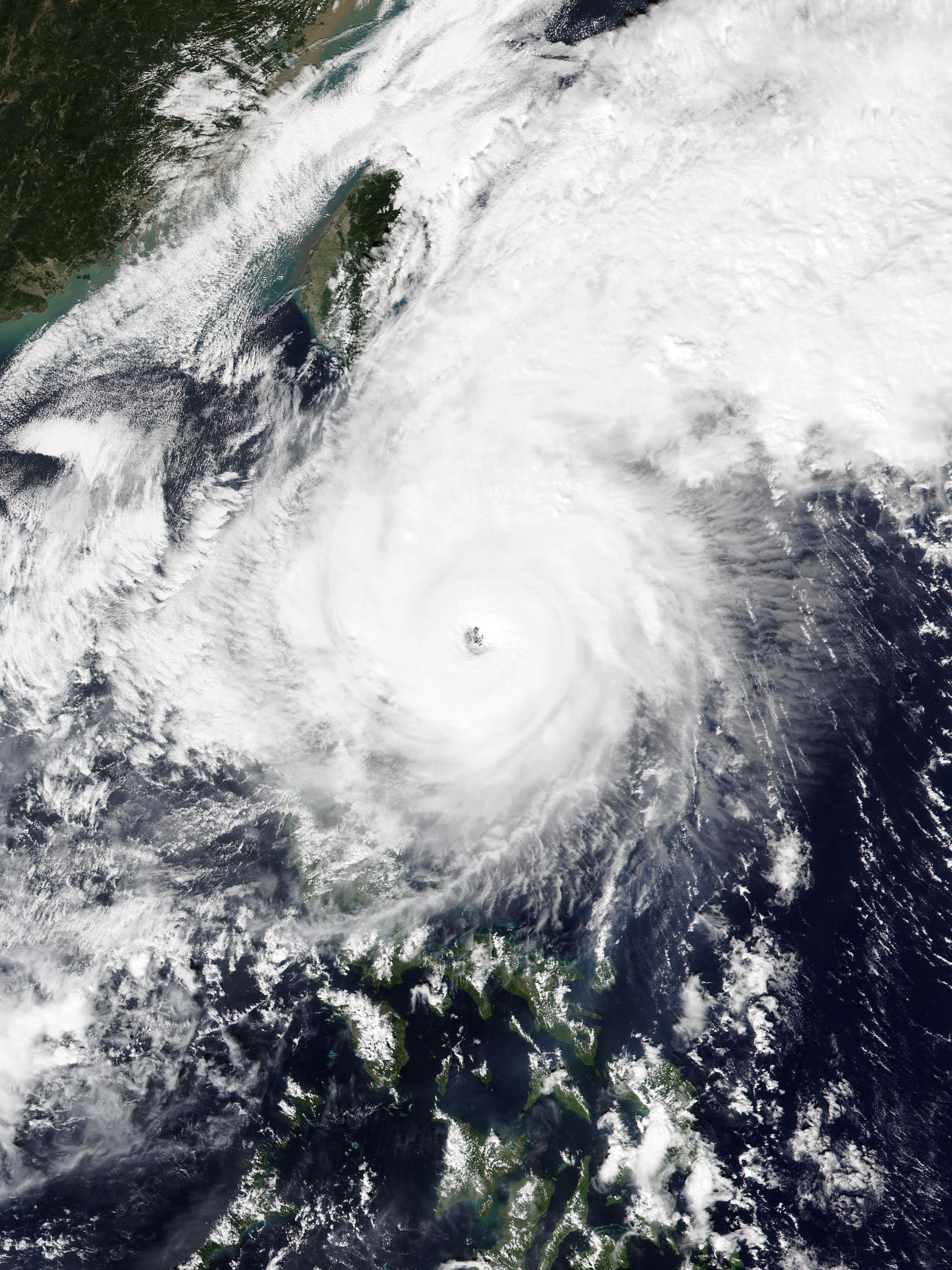
Yinxing shortly before its peak intensity and landfall on Luzon on November 7.

November 7

- 06:00 UTC
  - At 18.5°N 122.4°E – The JMA analyzes Yinxing (Marce) had attained its peak with 10-minute sustained winds of 100 knots (190 km/h; 120 mph) and a central pressure of 945 hPa (945.0 mbar; 27.91 inHg) as it is about to hit northeastern Luzon.
  - At 18.6°N 122.2°E – The JTWC upgrades Yinxing (Marce) to a Category 4 super typhoon, simultaneously attaining its peak with 1-minute sustained winds of 130 knots (240 km/h; 150 mph) and a central pressure of 931 hPa (931.0 mbar; 27.49 inHg).
- 07:40 UTC (15:40 PHT) at 18.5°N 122.1°E – Typhoon Yinxing (Marce) makes landfall on Santa Ana, Cagayan.
- 12:00 UTC at 18.6°N 121.5°E – The JTWC downgrades Yinxing (Marce) back to a Category 4 typhoon after it had emerged over the Babuyan Channel.
- 14:00 UTC (22:00 PHT) at 18.6°N 121.2°E – Typhoon Yinxing (Marce) makes another hit at Sanchez Mira, Cagayan.
- 18:00 UTC
  - At 10.3°N 168.5°E – The JMA monitors a newly-formed tropical depression near the Marshall Islands.
  - At 18.2°N 120.3°E – Typhoon Yinxing (Marce) weakens further to a Category 2 typhoon after it had emerged over the South China Sea.

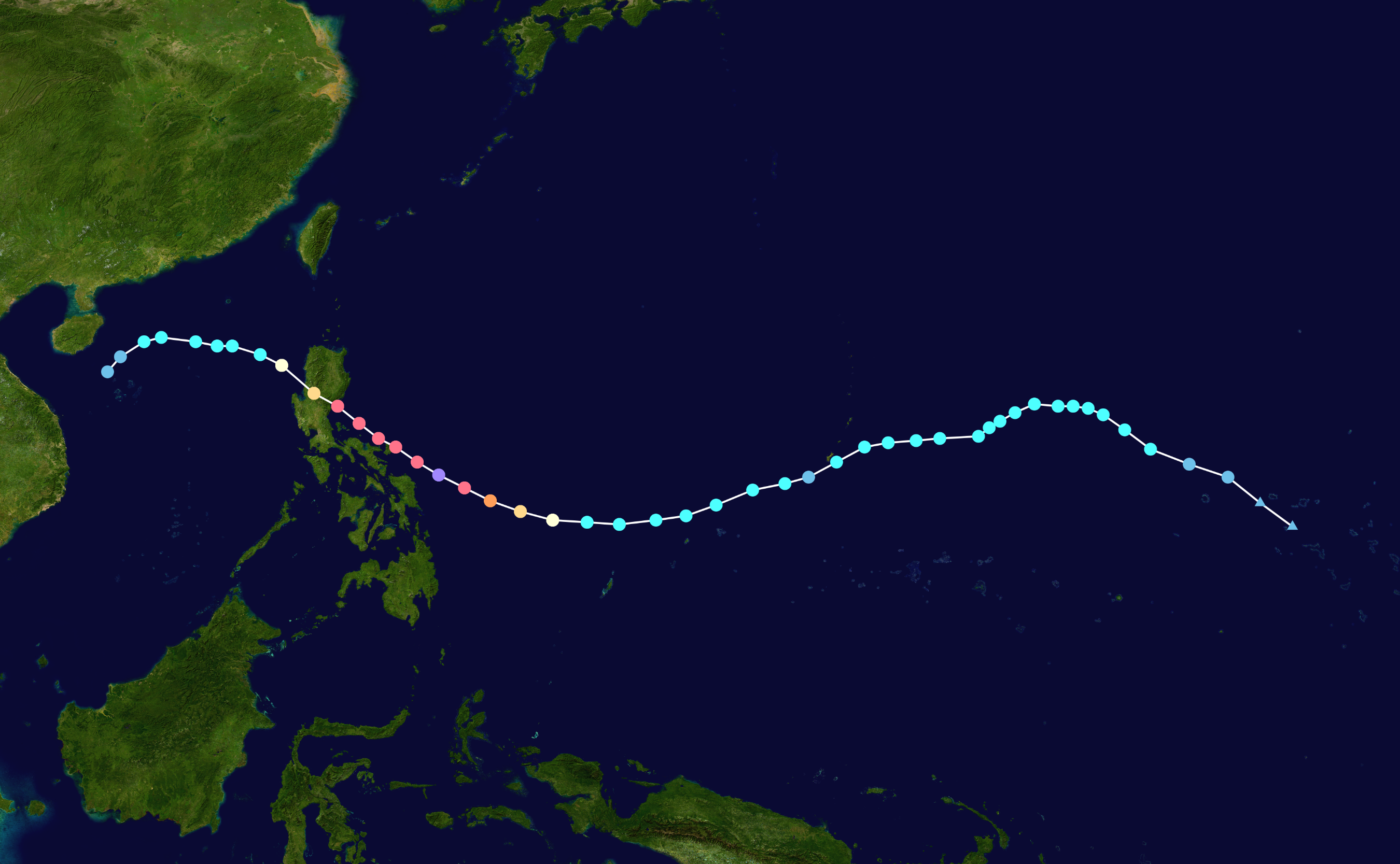
Track of Man-yi during mid November.

November 8

- 06:00 UTC
  - At 14.5°N 137.6°E – The JMA starts tracking another tropical depression over the Philippine Sea with a central pressure of 1,006 hPa (1,006 mbar; 29.71 inHg).
  - At 11.7°N 165.1°E – The JMA assesses the tropical depression near the Marshall Islands has attained a central pressure of 1,006 hPa (1,006 mbar; 29.71 inHg) as it moves west-northwest near Bikini Atoll.
  - At 18.4°N 118.1°E – The JTWC assesses Yinxing (Marce) has slightly deepened to a central pressure of 969 hPa (969.0 mbar; 28.61 inHg) as it moves west-northwestward.
- 08:00 UTC (16:00 PHT) – The PAGASA announces Yinxing (Marce) has exited the PAR.
- 12:00 UTC at 12.5°N 163.3°E – The JTWC designates the tropical depression near the Marshall Islands as 25W.
- 18:00 UTC
  - At 12.2°N 161.9°E – The JMA reports 25W has intensified to a tropical storm, naming it Man-yi.
  - At 18.6°N 115.8°E – The JTWC assesses Yinxing has re-intensified to a Category 3 typhoon as it gradually accelerates.
  - At 14.6°N 134.6°E – The JTWC starts tracking the tropical depression over the Philippine Sea, designating it 26W.
  - (02:00 PHT, November 9) at 14.5°N 134.9°E – The PAGASA also starts tracking 26W, giving it a local name Nika.

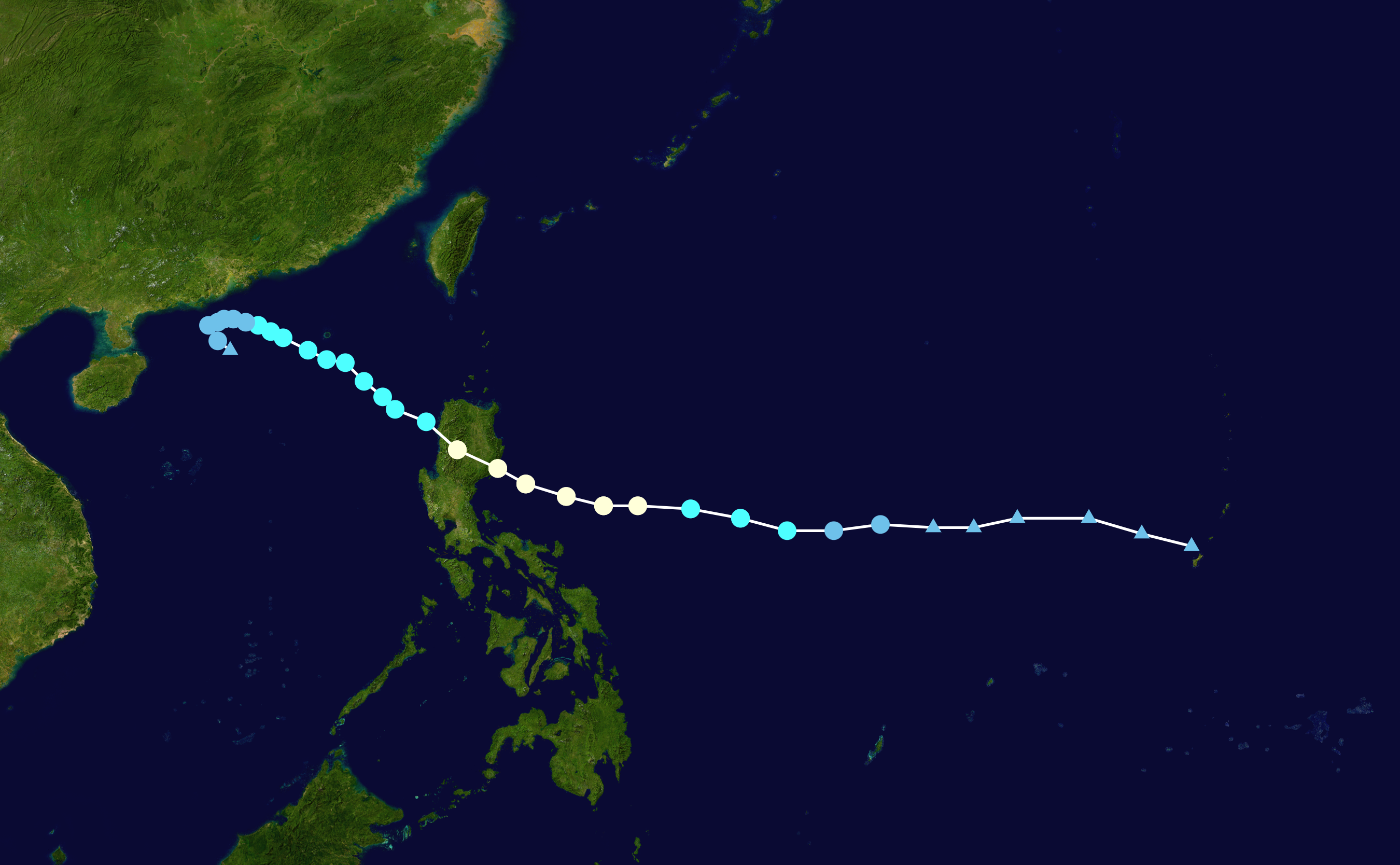
Track of Toraji during early-mid November.

November 9

- 00:00 UTC
  - At 18.9°N 114.9°E – The JMA analyzes Yinxing reached a secondary peak with 10-minute sustained winds of 85 knots (157 km/h; 98 mph) and a central pressure of 965 hPa (965.0 mbar; 28.50 inHg) while slowing down.
  - At 6.7°N 151.4°E – Another tropical depression forms near Chuuk, located to the southwest of Man-yi.
  - At 13.8°N 159.7°E – The JTWC upgrades Man-yi to a tropical storm as it slightly shifts northwestward.
- 06:00 UTC
  - (14:00 PHT) at 14.6°N 131.6°E – The JMA and PAGASA upgrade 26W (Nika) to a tropical storm, with the former naming it Toraji.
  - At 14.4°N 131.6°E – The JTWC also upgrades Toraji (Nika) to a tropical storm as it continues moving west-northwestward.
- 12:00 UTC at 19.1°N 113.6°E – The JTWC assesses Yinxing had peaked for the second time as a high-end Category 3 typhoon with 1-minute sustained winds of 110 knots (200 km/h; 130 mph) and a central pressure of 954 hPa (954.0 mbar; 28.17 inHg).
- 18:00 UTC at 15.7°N 157.7°E – The JMA assesses Man-yi had attained an initial peak with 10-minute sustained winds of 45 knots (83 km/h; 52 mph) and a central pressure of 1,000 hPa (1,000 mbar; 29.53 inHg) as it turns to the west.

November 10

- 00:00 UTC
  - (08:00 PHT) at 15.1°N 126.9°E – The JMA and PAGASA further upgrade Toraji (Nika) to a severe tropical storm as it approaches Luzon.
  - At 15.2°N 126.8°E – The JTWC reports Toraji (Nika) has intensified further to a Category 1 typhoon.
  - At 15.8°N 156.1°E – The JTWC also assesses Man-yi had attained an initial peak with 1-minute sustained winds of 50 knots (93 km/h; 58 mph) and a central pressure of 997 hPa (997.0 mbar; 29.44 inHg), located well east of the Marianas.
- 06:00 UTC at 18.9°N 113.0°E – The JTWC reports Yinxing has weakened to a Category 2 typhoon as it now dips southwestward.
- 12:00 UTC
  - (20:00 PHT) at 15.5°N 124.3°E – Toraji (Nika) further intensifies to a typhoon, per the JMA and PAGASA.
  - At 15.5°N 124.5°E – The JTWC assesses Toraji (Nika) has peaked as a high-end Category 1 typhoon with 1-minute sustained winds of 80 knots (150 km/h; 92 mph) and a central pressure of 976 hPa (976.0 mbar; 28.82 inHg).
  - At 18.6°N 112.7°E – The JMA and JTWC downgrades Yinxing to a severe tropical storm and to a Category 1 typhoon, respectively, as it gradually accelerates southwestward.
- 18:00 UTC
  - (02:00 PHT, November 11) at 15.9°N 123.2°E – The JMA and PAGASA assess Toraji (Nika) has peaked with 10-minute winds of 70 knots (130 km/h; 81 mph) and a minimum central pressure of 980 hPa (980.0 mbar; 28.94 inHg) and 975 hPa (975.0 mbar; 28.79 inHg), respectively, as it nears landfall.
  - At 11.3°N 141.0°E – The JTWC designates the tropical depression formerly near Chuuk as 27W, as it moves to the northeast of Yap.
  - At 17.9°N 112.1°E – The JTWC further downgrades Yinxing to a tropical storm as it approaches the Paracel Islands.

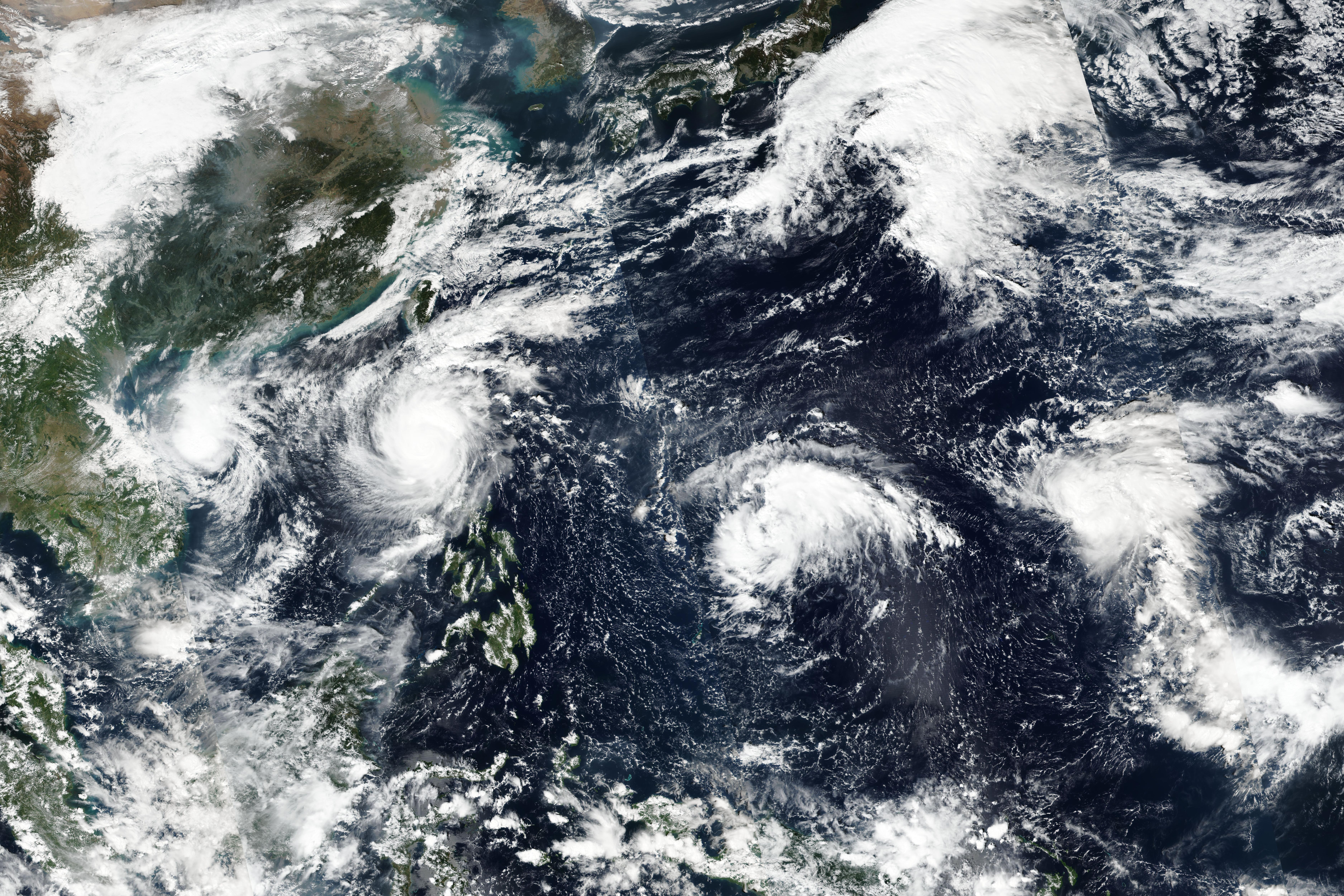
Four tropical cyclones simultaneously active on November 11: Yinxing (left-most) moving southwestward over the South China Sea, Toraji (center-left) impacting the Philippines, pre-Usagi (center-right) strengthening over the Philippine Sea, and Man-yi (right-most) approaching the Mariana Islands.

November 11

- 00:10 UTC (08:10 PHT) at 16.4°N 122.2°E – Typhoon Toraji (Nika) hits Dilasag, Aurora.
- 06:00 UTC
  - (14:00 PHT) at 17.1°N 121.1°E – The JMA and PAGASA downgrades Toraji (Nika) to a severe tropical storm as it traverses Luzon.
  - At 14.8°N 152.2°E – The JTWC reports Man-yi has slightly deepened to a central pressure of 1,000 hPa (1,000 mbar; 29.53 inHg) as it moves southwestwards.
- 12:00 UTC
  - At 12.5°N 136.5°E – The JTWC upgrades 27W to a tropical storm as it moves west-northwestward.
  - At 17.9°N 120.0°E – The JTWC downgrades Toraji (Nika) to a tropical storm after emerging over the South China Sea.
  - At 15.7°N 110.6°E – The JMA downgrades Yinxing to a tropical storm as it heads for Vietnam.
- 18:00 UTC
  - (02:00 PHT, November 12) at 12.6°N 135.0°E – The JMA upgrades 27W to a tropical storm, naming it Usagi, as the PAGASA reports the system has entered the PAR, also naming it as Ofel.
  - At 18.3°N 119.0°E – The JTWC assesses Toraji (Nika) has briefly re-strengthened with 1-minute winds of 45 knots (83 km/h; 52 mph) and a central pressure of 990 hPa (990.0 mbar; 29.23 inHg) as it moves on a northwestward heading.

November 12

- 00:00 UTC at 14.5°N 109.7°E – The JTWC reports Yinxing has weakened to a tropical depression as it is about to hit Vietnam.
- 04:00 UTC (12:00 PHT) – The PAGASA announces Toraji (Nika) has exited the PAR.
- 06:00 UTC
  - (14:00 PHT) at 14.0°N 131.9°E – The JMA and PAGASA further upgrade Usagi (Ofel) to a severe tropical storm as it steadily moves west-northwestward.
  - At 19.1°N 118.2°E – The JMA downgrades Toraji further to a tropical storm as it moves over the South China Sea.
  - At 14.1°N 109.4°E – The JMA downgrades Yinxing further to a tropical depression.
- Between 06:00-12:00 UTC (13:00-19:00 ICT) – Yinxing makes its final landfall on Bình Định province.
- 12:00 UTC
  - At 19.8°N 117.4°E – The JTWC analyzes that Toraji has briefly re-strengthened, re-attaining 1-minute winds of 45 knots (83 km/h; 52 mph) but with a slightly higher central pressure of 991 hPa (991.0 mbar; 29.26 inHg) as it slows.
  - At 14.0°N 108.7°E – The JMA stops tracking Yinxing as it dissipates six hours later inland.
- 18:00 UTC
  - At 14.7°N 129.0°E – The JTWC determines Usagi (Ofel) has strengthened to a Category 1 typhoon.
  - (02:00 PHT, November 13) at 14.6°N 129.0°E – The PAGASA reports Usagi (Ofel) has further intensified to a typhoon as it approaches Luzon.
  - At 13.9°N 107.0°E – The JTWC downgrades Yinxing further to a tropical disturbance over Cambodia.

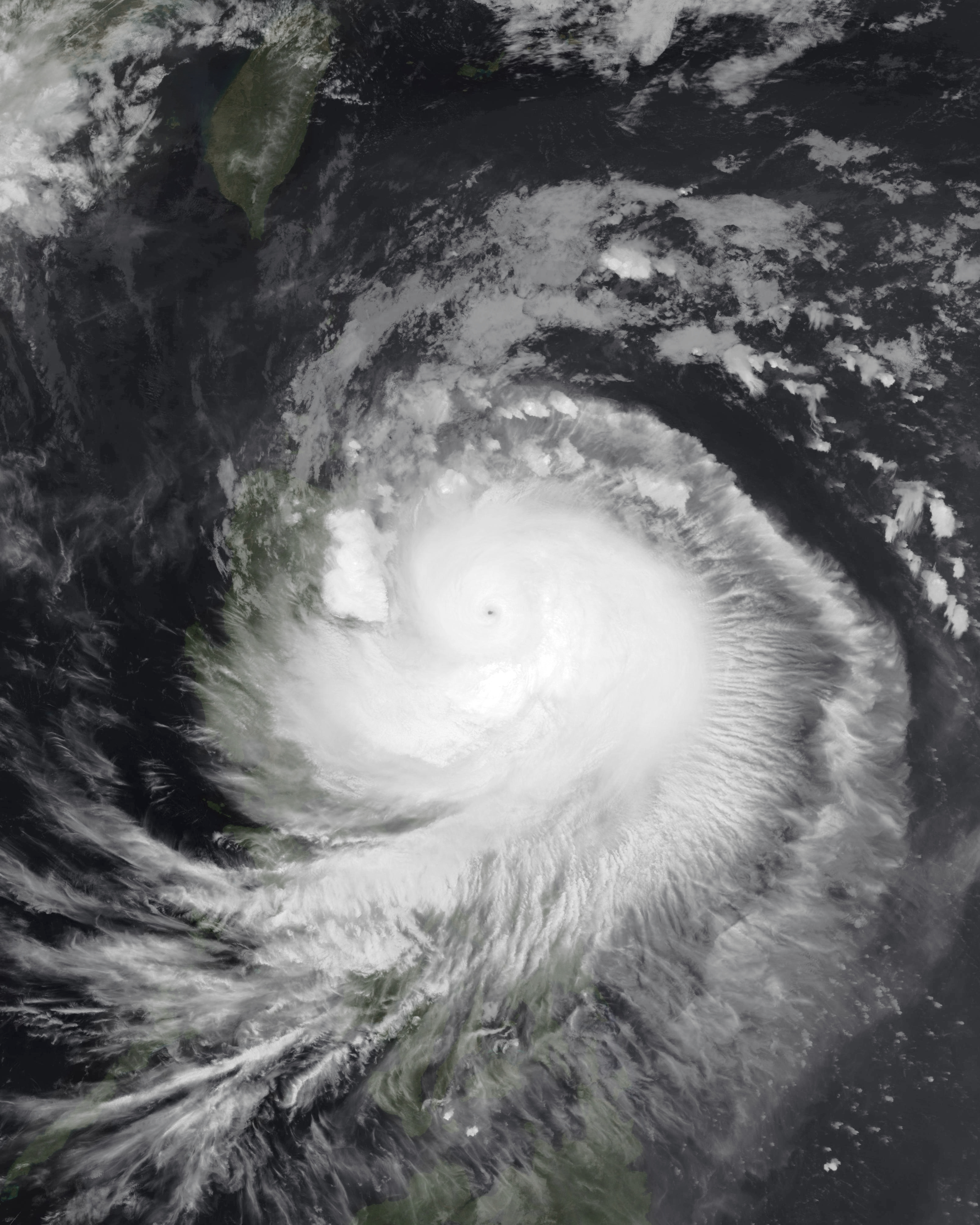
Usagi shortly before its peak intensity as it moves closer to Luzon on November 13.

November 13

- 00:00 UTC
  - At 15.0°N 127.9°E – The JMA also upgrades Usagi (Ofel) to a typhoon as it slightly shifts northwestward.
  - At 12.5°N 143.8°E – Now moving to the southwest of Guam, the JTWC reports Man-yi has weakened to a tropical depression.
- 06:00 UTC
  - At 15.6°N 126.5°E – The JTWC reports Usagi (Ofel) has intensified further to a Category 2 typhoon as it starts to rapidly intensify.
  - At 12.2°N 142.7°E – The JTWC re-upgrades Man-yi to a tropical storm as it now moves over the Philippine Sea.
- 12:00 UTC
  - At 16.2°N 125.2°E – Typhoon Usagi (Ofel) rapidly intensifies to a Category 4 typhoon, per the JTWC.
  - At 20.8°N 115.0°E – The JTWC determines Toraji has slightly deepened to a central pressure of 992 hPa (992.0 mbar; 29.29 inHg) as it slowly moves south of Hong Kong.
- 18:00 UTC
  - At 16.7°N 123.9°E – The JTWC assesses Usagi (Ofel) has further strengthened to a Category 4 super typhoon, simultaneously peaking with 1-minute winds of 130 knots (240 km/h; 150 mph) and a central pressure of 934 hPa (934.0 mbar; 27.58 inHg).
  - (02:00 PHT, November 14) at 16.6°N 124.0°E – The PAGASA also reports Usagi (Ofel) has strengthened to a super-typhoon, peaking with 10-minute winds of 100 knots (190 km/h; 120 mph) and a central pressure of 940 hPa (940.0 mbar; 27.76 inHg).
  - At 11.2°N 139.5°E – The JTWC reports Man-yi has slightly deepened to a central pressure of 1,001 hPa (1,001 mbar; 29.56 inHg) as it moves to the northeast of Yap.

November 14

- 00:00 UTC
  - At 17.2°N 123.1°E – The JMA reports Usagi (Ofel) has attained its peak intensity, with 10-minute winds of 95 knots (176 km/h; 109 mph) and a central pressure of 940 hPa (940.0 mbar; 27.76 inHg) as it moves closer to northeastern Luzon. However, the JTWC determines the system has weakened and is back to a Category 4 typhoon.
  - At 10.6°N 138.0°E – The JMA upgrades Man-yi to a severe tropical storm as it turns westward, making its closest approach to Yap.
  - At 21.1°N 114.2°E – The JTWC downgrades Toraji to a tropical depression.
- 03:00 UTC (11:00 PHT) – The PAGASA reports Usagi (Ofel) has weakened to a typhoon as it is about to hit Cagayan.
- 05:30 UTC (13:30 PHT) at 17.9°N 121.8°E – Typhoon Usagi (Ofel) hits Baggao, Cagayan.
- 06:00 UTC at 17.9°N 122.1°E – The JTWC assesses Usagi (Ofel) has weakened further to a Category 3 typhoon after making landfall.
- 12:00 UTC
  - At 18.8°N 121.4°E – The JTWC determines Usagi (Ofel) has rapidly weakened to a Category 1 typhoon after emerging over the Babuyan Channel and is passing close to Fuga Island.
  - (20:00 PHT) at 10.5°N 135.4°E – The PAGASA reports Man-yi has entered the PAR, naming it Pepito.
  - At 21.2°N 113.6°E – The JMA also downgrades Toraji to a tropical depression as it slowly turns southwestward south of Macau.
- 18:00 UTC at 19.3°N 120.9°E – The JMA downgrades Usagi (Ofel) to a severe tropical storm as it pulls away from the Babuyan Islands.

November 15

- 00:00 UTC (08:00 PHT)
  - At 10.5°N 131.9°E – The JMA, JTWC, and PAGASA report Man-yi (Pepito) has intensified into a typhoon as it turns west-northwestward.
  - At 20.0°N 120.3°E – The PAGASA also downgrades Usagi (Ofel) to a severe tropical storm as it slowly turns northward.
- 05:00 UTC (13:00 PHT) – The PAGASA reports Usagi (Ofel) has exited the PAR, but expects the system to re-enter.
- 06:00 UTC
  - At 10.9°N 130.4°E – The JTWC upgrades Man-yi (Pepito) further to a Category 2 typhoon as it moves closer to the Philippines.
  - At 21.1°N 119.4°E – The JTWC downgrades Usagi to a tropical storm as it turns to the northeast.
- 12:00 UTC
  - At 11.4°N 129.0°E – Typhoon Man-yi (Pepito) continues to rapidly intensify and is now a Category 3 typhoon, per the JTWC.
  - At 21.4°N 120.1°E – The JMA downgrades Usagi further to a tropical storm as it approaches Taiwan.
  - At 20.3°N 113.7°E – The JMA last notes Toraji after making a U-turn to the southeast; the system dissipates six hours later.
  - At 20.2°N 113.7°E – The JTWC downgrades Toraji further to a tropical disturbance while lingering over the South China Sea.
- 18:00 UTC
  - At 12.0°N 127.8°E – The JTWC further upgrades Man-yi (Pepito) to a Category 4 typhoon and is nearing super typhoon status.
  - (02:00 PHT, November 16) at 21.9°N 120.2°E – The PAGASA announces Usagi has re-entered the PAR as it turns eastward.

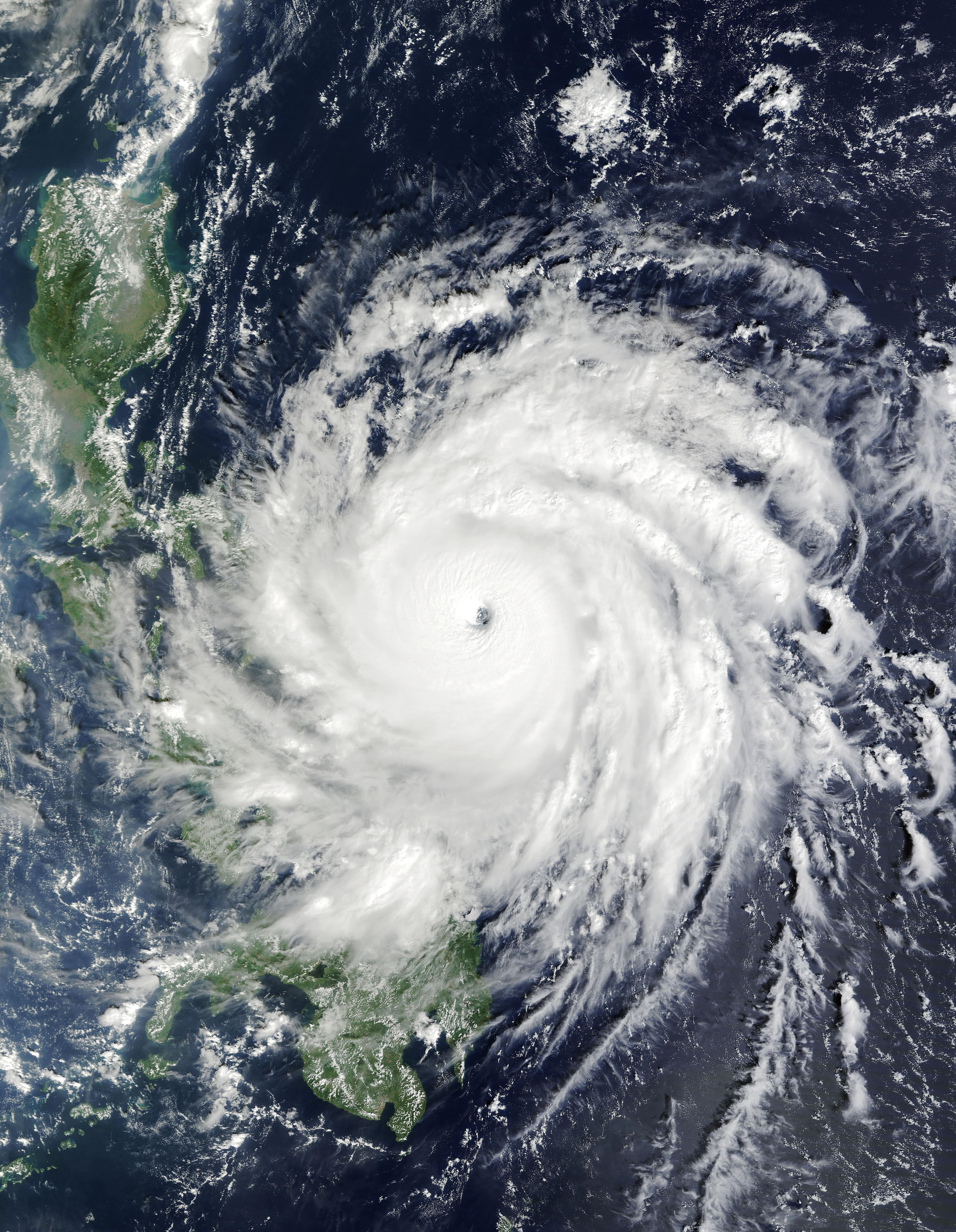
Man-yi at its peak intensity moving near the Philippines on November 16.

Man-yi hitting Catanduanes near its peak on November 16.

November 16

- 00:00 UTC (08:00 PHT/TST)
  - At 12.6°N 126.7°E – The JMA assesses Man-yi (Pepito) has reached its peak intensity with 10-minute winds of 105 knots (194 km/h; 121 mph) and a central pressure of 920 hPa (920.0 mbar; 27.17 inHg) while the PAGASA reports the system has attained super typhoon status.
  - At 12.6°N 126.6°E – The JTWC further upgrades Man-yi (Pepito) to a Category 5 super typhoon, peaking with 1-minute winds of 140 knots (260 km/h; 160 mph) and a central pressure of 924 hPa (924.0 mbar; 27.29 inHg) near Samar Island.
  - At 22.3°N 120.4°E – The JMA and PAGASA downgrade Usagi (Ofel) to a tropical depression as it moves near Liuqiu Island.
  - At 22.8°N 120.3°E – The JTWC also downgrades Usagi (Ofel) to a tropical storm after it had hit Kaohsiung City, per their analysis.
- 06:00 UTC
  - At 13.2°N 125.6°E – The JTWC reports Man-yi (Pepito) has leveled off from its peak and weakened to a Category 4 super typhoon as it approaches Catanduanes.
  - (14:00 PHT) at 13.3°N 125.6°E – The PAGASA assesses Man-yi (Pepito) has reached its peak intensity with 10-minute winds of 105 knots (194 km/h; 121 mph) and a central pressure of 925 hPa (925.0 mbar; 27.32 inHg).
- 12:00 UTC
  - At 22.2°N 120.5°E – The JMA last notes Usagi (Ofel) off the southwestern coast of Taiwan, as the system dissipates six hours later.
  - At 21.6°N 120.5°E – The JTWC downgrades Usagi (Ofel) further to a tropical disturbance after emerging over the Bashi Channel.
  - (20:00 PHT) at 22.1°N 120.3°E – The PAGASA reports Usagi (Ofel) has weakened to a remnant low after making a tight clockwise loop.
- 13:40 UTC (21:40 PHT) at 13.9°N 124.3°E – Man-yi (Pepito) makes its first landfall on Panganiban, Catanduanes.
- 18:00 UTC at 14.3°N 123.8°E – The JTWC reports Man-yi (Pepito) has weakened below super typhoon status after crossing Catanduanes.

Doppler radar loop of Man-yi on November 17, showing signs of re-strengthening just before its second landfall on Aurora.

November 17

- 06:00 UTC at 15.8°N 121.9°E – The JTWC determines Man-yi (Pepito) has re-intensified to a Category 4 super typhoon, attaining a secondary peak intensity with 1-minute winds of 130 knots (240 km/h; 150 mph) and a central pressure of 933 hPa (933.0 mbar; 27.55 inHg) as it is about to make another hit.
- 07:20 UTC (15:20 PHT) at 16.0°N 121.6°E – Man-yi (Pepito) makes its second and final hit on Dipaculao, Aurora.
- 09:00 UTC (17:00 PHT) – The PAGASA downgrades Man-yi (Pepito) to a typhoon after making landfall in Luzon.
- 12:00 UTC at 16.4°N 120.8°E – The JTWC reports Man-yi (Pepito) has rapidly weakened to a Category 2 typhoon as it is about to finish traversing the island.
- 18:00 UTC at 17.7°N 119.3°E – The JTWC downgrades Man-yi (Pepito) to a Category 1 typhoon after it had emerged over the South China Sea.

November 18

- 00:00 UTC at 18.2°N 118.3°E – The JTWC reports Man-yi (Pepito) has weakened further to a tropical storm as it moves west-northwest.
- 03:00 UTC (11:00 PHT) – The PAGASA reports Man-yi (Pepito) has exited the PAR.
- 06:00 UTC at 18.6°N 117.0°E – The JTWC assesses Man-yi has slightly deepened to a central pressure of 992 hPa (992.0 mbar; 29.29 inHg).
- 12:00 UTC at 18.9°N 116.0°E – The JMA downgrades Man-yi to a severe tropical storm as it turns westward over the South China Sea.

November 19

- 00:00 UTC at 19.0°N 114.7°E – The JMA downgrades Man-yi further to a tropical storm as it turns to the southwest.
- 12:00 UTC
  - At 18.1°N 112.0°E – The JMA downgrades Man-yi further to a tropical depression as it moves near the Paracel Islands.
  - At 18.1°N 111.8°E – The JTWC reports Man-yi has weakened further to a tropical depression, with a low central pressure of 995 hPa (995.0 mbar; 29.38 inHg) as it moves to the southeast of Hainan.
- 18:00 UTC at 17.4°N 111.2°E – The JTWC last notes Man-yi as it dissipates.

November 20

- 00:00 UTC at 16.5°N 110.6°E – The JMA stops tracking Man-yi near the Paracel Islands, with the system dissipating at 06 UTC.

=== December ===
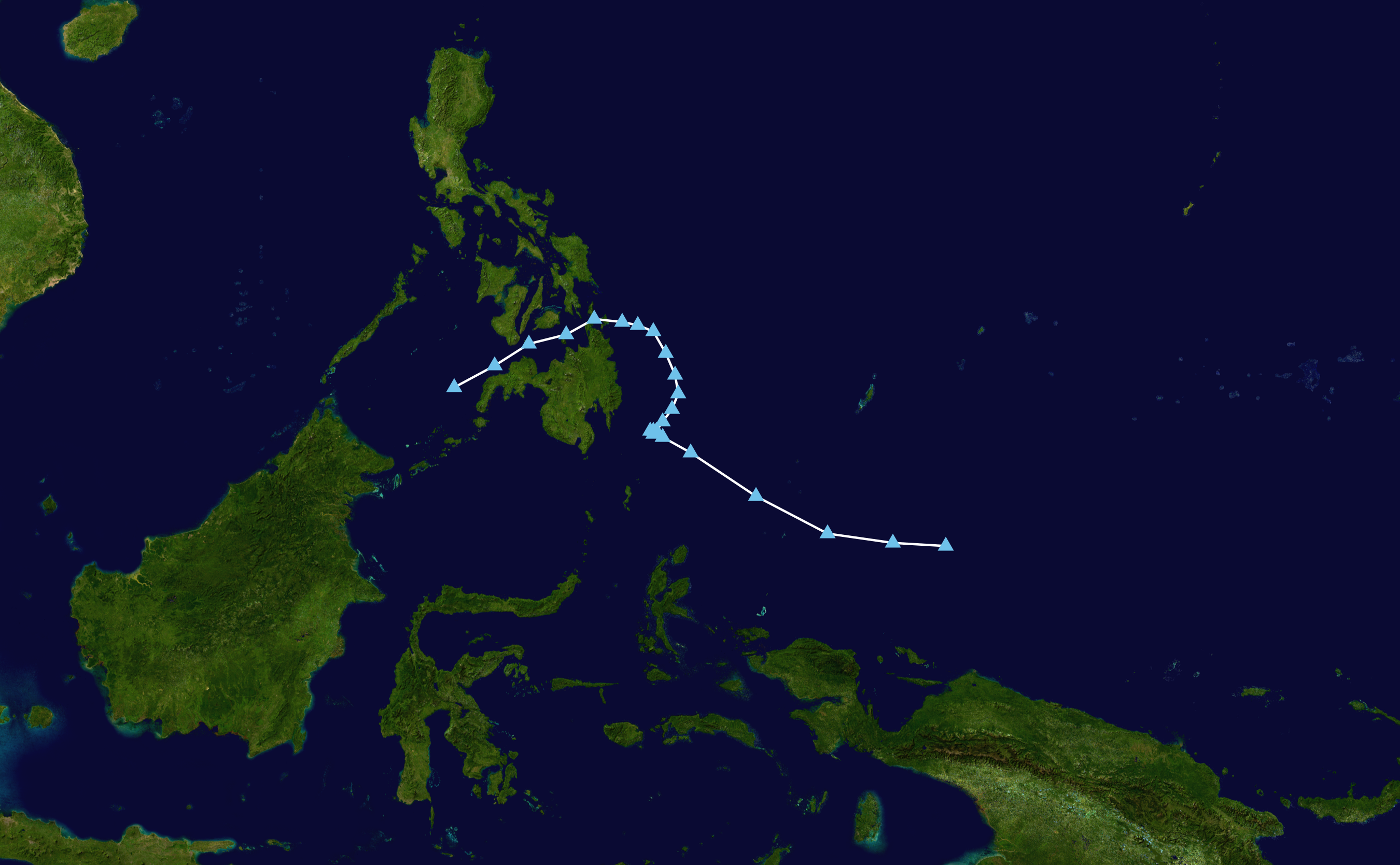
Track of Querubin during mid December.

December 16

- 12:00 UTC (20:00 PHT) at 6.2°N 127.4°E – The PAGASA starts tracking a tropical depression that had formed near Mindanao, naming it Querubin, assessing the system with 10-minute winds of 25 knots (46 km/h; 29 mph) and a central pressure of 1,004 hPa (1,004 mbar; 29.65 inHg).

December 17

- 00:00 UTC at 6.3°N 127.6°E – The JMA starts tracking on Querubin as it slowly moves northeastward.
- 06:00 UTC at 6.3°N 127.7°E – The JMA assesses Querubin has attained a central pressure of 1,004 hPa (1,004 mbar; 29.65 inHg).
- 18:00 UTC at 7.0°N 128.2°E – Tropical Depression Querubin re-attains a central pressure of 1,004 hPa (1,004 mbar; 29.65 inHg) as it gradually accelerates.

December 18

- 06:00 UTC at 8.1°N 128.3°E – The JMA analyzes Querubin has fluctuated back to a central pressure of 1,004 hPa (1,004 mbar; 29.65 inHg) as it turns to the northwest.
- 18:00 UTC at 9.5°N 127.6°E – Querubin deepens back to a central pressure of 1,004 hPa (1,004 mbar; 29.65 inHg) as it turns westward, per the JMA.

December 19

- 12:00 UTC
  - At 9.9°N 125.7°E – The JMA last notes Querubin as it weakens to a low-pressure area over Mindanao six hours later.
  - (20:00 PHT) at 9.6°N 126.2°E – The PAGASA reports Querubin has weakened to a remnant low near Siargao Island.

December 21

- 18:00 UTC at 10.1°N 115.3°E – A tropical depression forms over the South China Sea, west of Palawan.

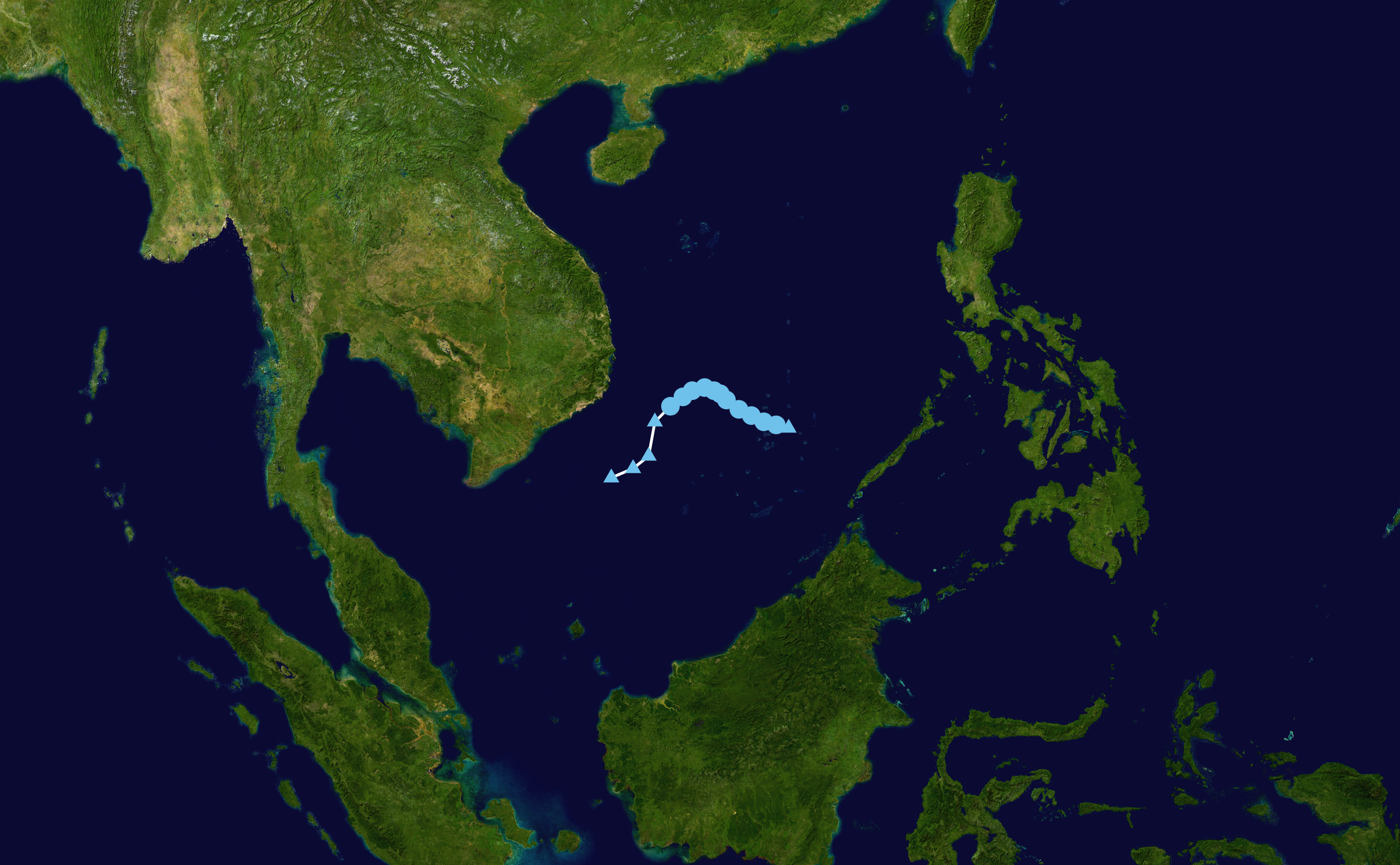
Track of Pabuk during late December.

Satellite loop of Pabuk approaching Vietnam on December 23.

December 22

- 00:00 UTC (08:00 PHT) at 7.6°N 114.6°E – Despite not entering the PAR, the PAGASA names the tropical depression west of Palawan, Romina, due to its proximity to the Kalayaan Islands.
- 06:00 UTC
  - At 10.5°N 114.2°E – The JMA upgrades Romina to a tropical storm, giving it the name Pabuk, with 10-minute winds of 35 knots (65 km/h; 40 mph) and a central pressure of 1,002 hPa (1,002 mbar; 29.59 inHg).
  - At 10.5°N 114.6°E – The JTWC starts tracking on Pabuk (Romina) as a tropical depression as it slowly moves westward.
- 12:00 UTC at 10.6°N 114.2°E – The JTWC assesses Pabuk (Romina) has deepened to a central pressure of 995 hPa (995.0 mbar; 29.38 inHg) as it gradually turns to the west-northwest.
- 18:00 UTC (02:00 PHT, December 23) at 10.6°N 113.3°E – The PAGASA assesses Pabuk (Romina) has attained its peak intensity as a high-end tropical depression with 10-minute winds of 30 knots (56 km/h; 35 mph) and a central pressure of 1,000 hPa (1,000 mbar; 29.53 inHg).
- 21:00 UTC (05:00 PHT, December 23) – The PAGASA issues its last bulletin on Pabuk (Romina) as it moves away from the Kalayaan Islands.

December 23

- 00:00 UTC at 11.0°N 113.4°E – The JTWC assesses Pabuk has attained its peak intensity as a high-end tropical depression with 1-minute winds of 30 knots (56 km/h; 35 mph) and a central pressure of 994 hPa (994.0 mbar; 29.35 inHg) as it turns northwestward slowly.

December 24

- 06:00 UTC at 11.6°N 111.9°E – The JTWC reports Pabuk has re-attained its peak intensity of 1-minute winds of 30 knots (56 km/h; 35 mph) and a central pressure of 994 hPa (994.0 mbar; 29.35 inHg) as it turns southwestward at a slow pace.
- 18:00 UTC at 11.1°N 111.3°E – The JMA downgrades Pabuk to a tropical depression as it nears Vietnam.

December 25

- 00:00 UTC at 10.6°N 110.7°E – The JTWC reports Pabuk has weakened to a tropical disturbance.
- 12:00 UTC at 9.4°N 110.2°E – The JMA last notes Pabuk as it continues to move southwestward, finally dissipating six hours later.

December 31

- 23:59 UTC – The 2024 Pacific typhoon season officially ends.

== See also ==
- Timeline of the 2024 Pacific hurricane season
- Timeline of the 2024 Atlantic hurricane season
