= Typhoon Kong-rey (2024) =

Pacific typhoon in 2024

Typhoon Kong-rey (Leon)
- Kong-rey at its peak intensity off the coast of the Philippines on October 30

Meteorological history
- Formed: October 24, 2024
- Extratropical: November 1, 2024
- Dissipated: November 7, 2024

Very strong typhoon
- 10-minute sustained (JMA)
- Highest winds: 185 km/h (115 mph)
- Lowest pressure: 925 hPa (mbar); 27.32 inHg

Category 5-equivalent super typhoon
- 1-minute sustained (SSHWS/JTWC)
- Highest winds: 260 km/h (160 mph)
- Lowest pressure: 915 hPa (mbar); 27.02 inHg

Overall effects
- Fatalities: 3
- Injuries: 690
- Missing: 1
- Damage: $167 million (2024 USD)
- Areas affected: Philippines (particularly Cagayan Valley); Taiwan; China (particularly East China); South Korea (particularly Jeju Island); Japan
- IBTrACS
- Part of the 2024 Pacific typhoon season

Typhoon Kong-rey, (Note: The name Kong-rey (Khmer: កង្រី, [kɑŋ.ˈrəj]) was contributed by Cambodia and refers to a girl from a Khmer legend, as well as a mountain named after that girl in Khmer.) known in the Philippines as Super Typhoon Leon, was a powerful and large tropical cyclone that impacted Taiwan and the Philippines before later affecting East China, South Korea, and Japan in late October and early November 2024. Kong-rey was the first typhoon in Taiwan's history to make landfall after mid-October, the latest typhoon on record in the calendar year to strike Taiwan, and the largest storm to strike since Typhoon Herb in 1996. Additionally, it was the second tropical cyclone in a series to impact the Philippines, following Tropical Storm Trami a few days earlier, and preceding Typhoons Yinxing, Toraji, Usagi, and Man-yi which would impact a few days later.

The twenty-first named storm and the third super typhoon of the annual typhoon season, Kong-rey developed from a weak exposed low-level circulation located west-northwest of Guam. On October 25, the Japan Meteorological Agency (JMA) upgraded the system to a tropical storm, naming it Kong-rey, and on October 28, the Joint Typhoon Warning Center (JTWC) classified it as a minimal typhoon before the JMA followed suit. On October 30, the JTWC reported that the system had peaked as a Category 5-equivalent super typhoon, with one-minute sustained winds of 260 km/h (160 mph). The following day, Kong-rey completed an eyewall replacement cycle and approached Taiwan from the southeast, and passed close to Batanes and the Orchid Island before making landfall in Chenggong, Taitung. It was later reemerged over the Taiwan Strait, then moved along the eastern coast of China as it interacted with a strong frontal system while beginning its extratropical transition. By November 1, the JMA reported that Kong-rey had transitioned into an extratropical low as it moved north-northeastward. The extratropical storm crossed into Japan the next day and then emerged into the Pacific Ocean. Its remnants were last noted by the JMA on November 4 near the International Dateline; however, the Ocean Prediction Center reported that these remnants crossed the Central North Pacific Ocean, and were gradually moving toward the Alaskan coast. On November 7, Kong-rey's remnants were absorbed into another extratropical cyclone just south of Southwest Alaska.

Authorities advised evacuations in Batangas, which was devastated by Tropical Storm Trami the previous week. In Taiwan, classes were suspended in Taitung County, and multiple flights and trips were also canceled. Heavy rain advisories were issued by the Central Weather Administration, with torrential rain warnings in Yilan County and Hualien County. In East China, Kong-rey brought strong winds and heavy rains to the provinces of Zhejiang and Fujian, while on Jeju Island, South Korea, Hallasan recorded up to 268.5 mm (10.57 in) of rain, resulting in flooding that damaged buildings across the island. The JMA reported that warm, moist air from the storm was bringing heavy rainfall and thunderstorms to western Japan. Overall, Kong-rey was responsible for three deaths and 690 injuries, causing approximately $167 million (2024 USD) in damages.

== Meteorological history ==
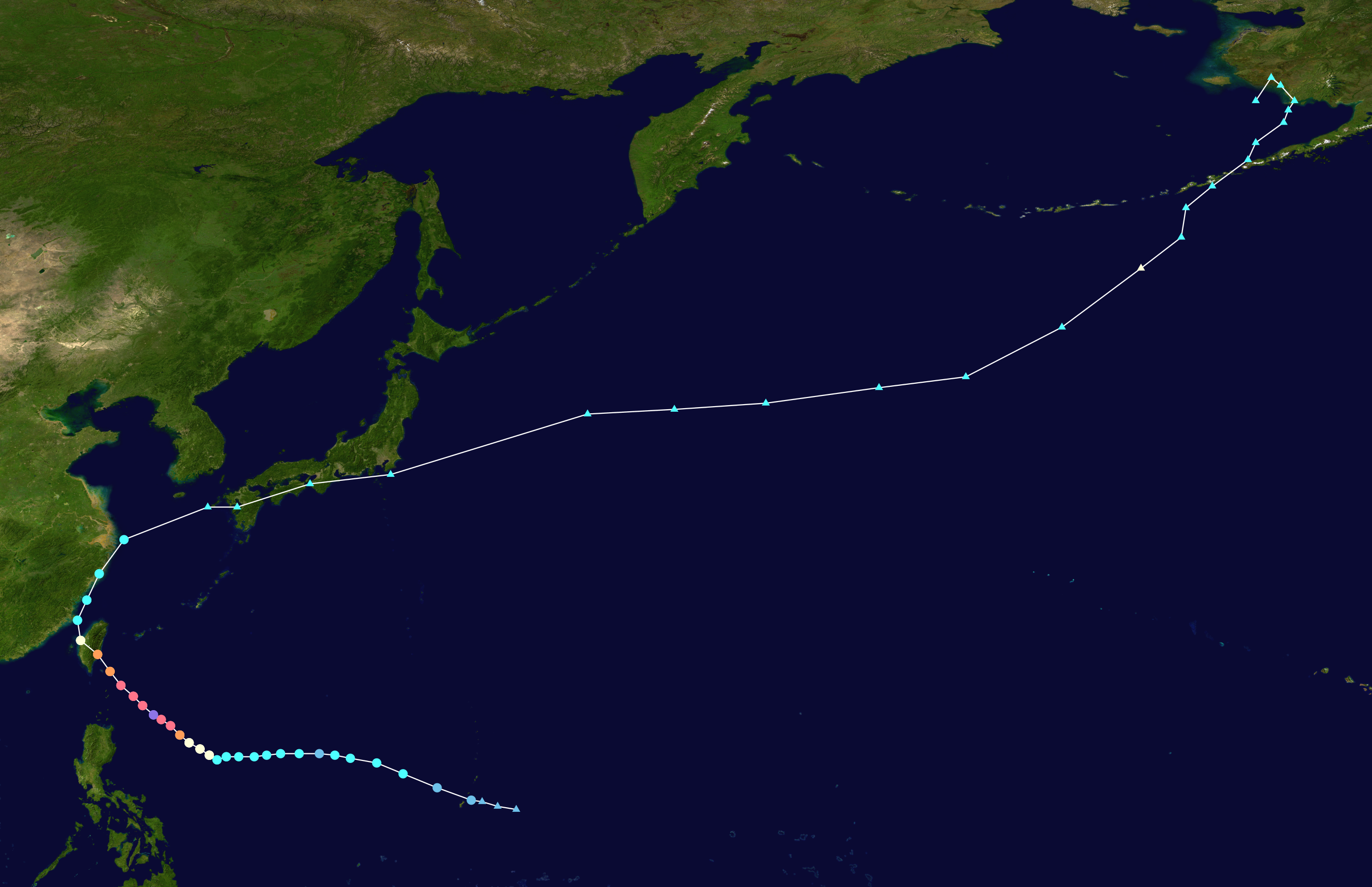
Map plotting the storm's track and intensity, according to the Saffir–Simpson scale Map key Saffir–Simpson scale Tropical depression (≤38 mph, ≤62 km/h) Tropical storm (39–73 mph, 63–118 km/h) Category 1 (74–95 mph, 119–153 km/h) Category 2 (96–110 mph, 154–177 km/h) Category 3 (111–129 mph, 178–208 km/h) Category 4 (130–156 mph, 209–251 km/h) Category 5 (≥157 mph, ≥252 km/h) Unknown Storm type Tropical cyclone Subtropical cyclone Extratropical cyclone, remnant low, tropical disturbance, or monsoon depression

The origins of Typhoon Kong-rey can be traced back to October 22, when the United States Joint Typhoon Warning Center (JTWC) started monitoring a weak exposed low-level circulation at 14.9°N 141.4°E, about 394 km (245 mi) west-northwest of Guam. Satellite imagery revealed limited deep convection primarily in the eastern and northern quadrants, while two disturbances near Invests 97W and 98W interacted within a complex steering environment, with 98W moving poleward and being absorbed by 97W. The Japan Meteorological Agency (JMA) designated the disturbance as a low-pressure area the following day, and on October 24, it was upgraded to a tropical depression. At 03:00 UTC on the same day, the JTWC issued a tropical cyclone formation alert, indicating that the environment was generally favorable for tropical cyclogenesis, with warm sea surface temperatures of 30 °C (86 °F), low vertical wind shear, and good radial outflow.

At 00:00 UTC on October 25, the JMA upgraded the system to a tropical storm named Kong-rey, which the JTWC later designated as 23W, featuring a partially obscured circulation center and a deep band of convection on its eastern and northern sides. Kong-rey exhibited a pronounced asymmetrical circulation with fragmented and disorganized convection as it moved northwestward along the southwestern edge of a mid-level subtropical high, while microwave imaging revealed curved convective bands concentrated in the western semicircle, with shallow bands tightly wrapping around a ragged circulation center. At 19:30 PHT (11:30 UTC) on October 26, Kong-rey entered the Philippine Area of Responsibility and was given the name Leon by PAGASA. Kong-rey exhibited a fully exposed circulation center surrounded by persistent convection in the southwestern quadrant, supported by moderate westward outflow, while spiral bands of deep convection were located to the north; satellite imagery revealed two separate low-level circulation centers rotating around a central point at 16.7°N 132.0°E, which eventually merged into a single, better-organized low-level circulation center characterized by broad banding over the western semicircle. As it moved west-southwestward along the southeastern periphery, the system displayed strong equatorward flow and improving poleward outflow, prompting the JMA to upgrade it to a severe tropical storm at 00:00 UTC on October 27. Early the next day, the JTWC upgraded the storm to a minimal typhoon before the JMA followed suit, which noted an improved structure with convective banding fully wrapping around the circulation and achieving a more symmetric shape; the typhoon also developed a large, ragged eye, characterized by a cloud-filled structure measuring 52 miles (83 km) in diameter.

Six simultaneously active tropical cyclone from October 19, 2024 to November 20, 2024. From left to right: Tropical Storm Trami and Typhoons Kong-rey, Yinxing, Toraji, Usagi, and Man-yi

On October 30, the JTWC reported that the system had peaked as a Category 5-equivalent super typhoon after Kong-rey attained 1-minute sustained winds of 260 km/h (160 mph), while the JMA indicated that Kong-rey reached its peak intensity with 10-minute sustained winds of 185 km/h (115 mph) and a central pressure of 925 hPa (27.32 inHg). Operationally, the JTWC classified Kong-rey as a Category 4-equivalent super typhoon with winds of 240 km/h (150 mph), but a post-cyclone reanalysis later concluded that it reached a peak wind speed of 260 km/h (160 mph).

After reaching its peak intensity, Kong-rey began an eyewall replacement cycle, with satellite imagery revealing a large eye and rapidly rotating features along the inner edge of the eyewall while it moved northwestward along its southwestern edge. The typhoon had a distinct and highly symmetrical eye measuring 46 miles (74 km) in diameter, while microwave imaging reveals a double concentric eyewall structure. Kong-rey completed the eyewall replacement cycle shortly afterward, resulting in a ragged but relatively symmetrical eye feature as the typhoon approached Taiwan from the southeast and passed close to Batanes and the Orchid Island. The following day at 1:40 p.m. local time, Kong-rey made landfall in Chenggong, Taitung in eastern Taiwan. This made Kong-rey the first typhoon in Taiwan's history to make landfall after mid-October, and it was the largest storm to hit since Typhoon Herb in 1996.

After making landfall, the eye quickly became cloud-filled, exhibiting deteriorating convective bands and eyewall structure, while surface observations from Taitung recorded sustained winds of 104 km/h (64 mph). It was later reemerged over the Taiwan Strait with a weakened convective structure, and its rapid movement across Taiwan may be attributed to a lee-side jump. It moved along the eastern coast of China as it interacted with a strong frontal system while beginning its extratropical transition. By 12:00 UTC on November 1, the JMA reported that Kong-rey had transitioned into an extratropical low as it moved north-northeastward along the northwestern periphery of a mid-level subtropical high, quickly developing frontal characteristics with a weak cold front extending south from the center and a warm front extending east-northeastward. At 21:00 UTC on the same day, the JTWC discontinued warnings for the system as it had completed its extratropical transition. The extratropical storm crossed into Japan the next day and emerged into the Pacific Ocean. Its remnants were last noted by the JMA on November 4 near the International Dateline; however, the Ocean Prediction Center reported that these remnants crossed the Central North Pacific Ocean, and were gradually moving toward the Alaskan coast. On November 7, Kong-rey's remnants were absorbed into another extratropical cyclone just south of Southwest Alaska.

== Preparations ==
=== Philippines ===
==== Highest Tropical Cyclone Wind Signal ====
Highest Tropical Cyclone Wind Signal issued by PAGASA for Kong-rey (Leon) in each province. The white line represents the best track.

PAGASA indicated that residents in the northern and northeastern parts of Luzon could expect rain on October 31 and November 1 due to the storm. Early on October 27, PAGASA issued Tropical Cyclone Wind Signal No. 1 to portions of Cagayan, Isabela, and Catanduanes. The next day, PAGASA included the entirety of Batanes, Ilocos Norte, Abra, Apayao, and Kalinga. PAGASA also included the entirety of Cagayan (including Babuyan Islands); Camarines Norte; Ifugao; Isabela; La Union; Mountain Province; Nueva Vizcaya, with portions of Quirino; Aurora; Benguet; Albay; Camarines Sur; Sorsogon; Northern Samar; and Eastern Samar. Later that evening, PAGASA included the entirety of Quirino and Aurora. On October 29, the entirety of Benguet was included. On the same day, PAGASA issued Signal No. 2 to Batanes; Babuyan Islands; and portions of Cagayan and Isabela. PAGASA later included the entirety of Cagayan; Apayao; Ilocos Norte; portions of Kalinga; and Abra, though Eastern and Northern Samar was removed from Signal No. 1, ending signals initiated in Visayas. Signal No. 2 was also granted to Mountain Province. After Kong-rey was upgraded into a super typhoon, Signal No. 3 was raised over Batanes and parts of the Babuyan Islands the next day, and a portion of mainland Cagayan six hours later.

Three hours later, Batanes was placed in Signal No. 4, with more provinces getting placed in Signal No. 1. A few hours later, the northern and eastern parts of Batanes were upgraded to Signal No. 5, the highest warning level. The next day, Batanes was later downgraded to Signal No. 4, with the Babuyan Islands being downgraded from Signal No. 4 to 3. Three hours later, Batanes was downgraded to Signal No. 3, with Babuyan Islands also being downgraded to Signal No. 2. Multiple provinces were removed from Signal No. 1 and 2. Gale warnings were issued for the coasts of northern and central Luzon. Authorities ordered evacuations in Batangas, which was devastated by Tropical Storm Trami (Kristine) the previous week. In Cagayan, more than 8,000 people were evacuated. Several airline and shipping companies cancelled services. The Magat Dam left one of its spillways open as a precaution. The government of Albay also prepared for the possible impacts of Kong-rey. The Office of Civil Defense estimated that between 2.5 million and 5 million people could be impacted by Kong-rey in the Ilocos Region, Cagayan Valley, Cordillera Administrative Region, Central Luzon, Mimaropa, Calabarzon, and the Bicol Region. Some local government units have announced that classes will be canceled on October 31 because of the storm. Telecommunications company Smart prepared emergency supplies and personnel in areas where the storm was expected to approach. According to the Civil Aviation Authority of the Philippines, more than 500 travelers were affected by the canceled flights.

=== Taiwan ===
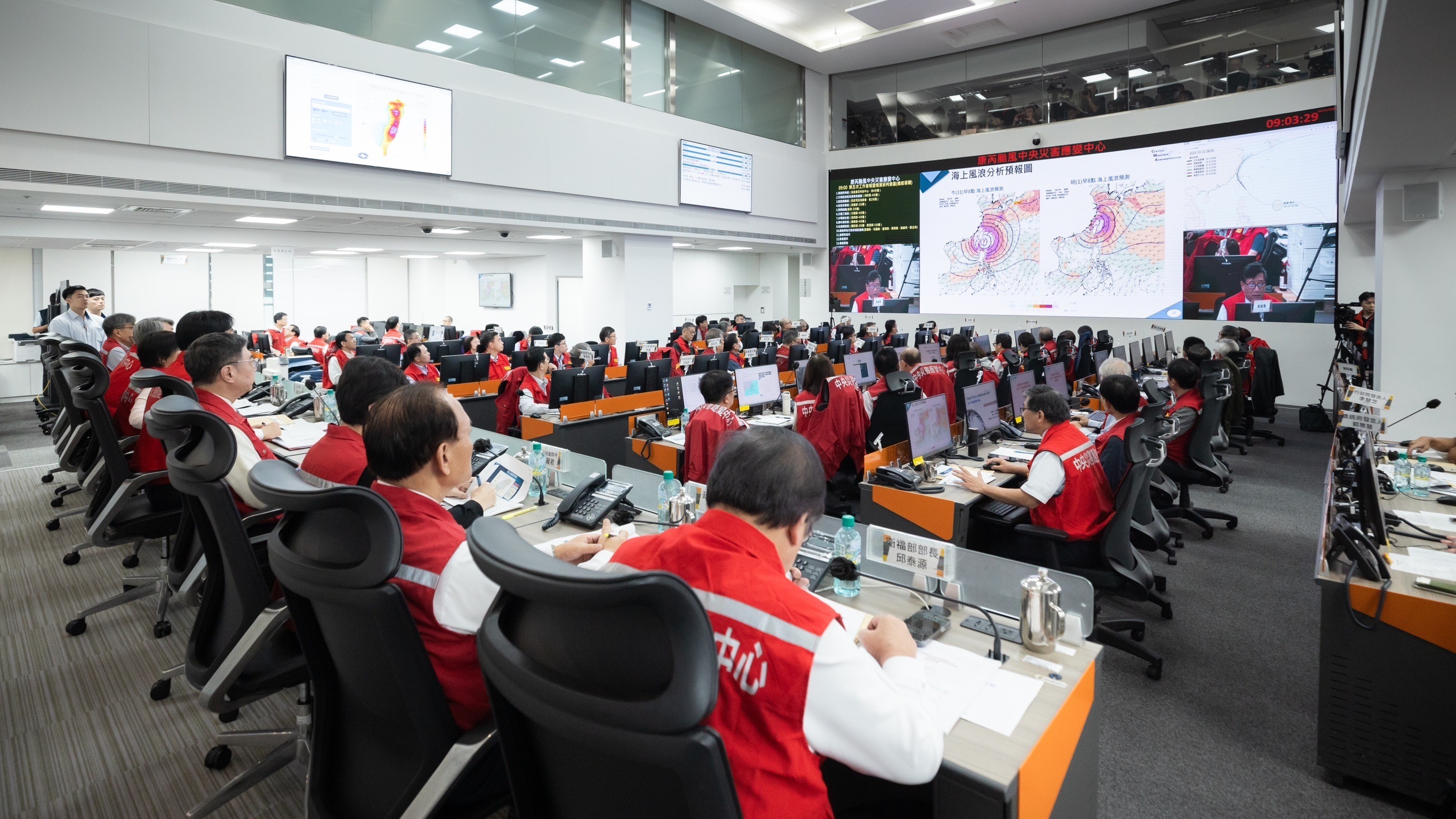
President Lai Ching-te and other central government administrative officials inspected the Central Disaster Response Center

The defence ministry placed 36,000 soldiers on standby for rescue efforts. Some train services were cancelled. Concerts by Mayday and Andy Lau were postponed. The Dominate World Tour concert by Stray Kids, which was scheduled on November 2 at the Kaohsiung National Stadium, was also postponed to November 3. More than 400 flights were cancelled while the entire ferry system was suspended. On October 29, the Central Weather Administration (CWA) released its first sea warning for the storm covering southeastern Taiwan and the Bashi Channel, adding that Kong-rey could generate waves with a height ranging from 16–20 ft (5–6 m) and rain measuring 20–31 in (500–800 mm). Classes were suspended in Taitung County, with multiple flights and trips also cancelled. Local residents stocked up on vegetables, while fishermen gathered their boats. The National Fire Agency predicted trees to topple. Orchid Island and Green Island suspended work and classes. The Soil and Water Conservation Bureau warned against potential threat of landslides, urging residents to be alert. Fishing communities added extra precaution measures. Agencies were prepared against damaged buildings, power lines, and flood rescues. Rescue personnel were also stationed across the country. At least 11,588 people were evacuated.

The CWA later released its first land warning for the storm on October 30, covering Taitung County and the Hengchun Peninsula. The warnings were later expanded that day to cover the entirety of Taiwan. Heavy rain advisories were also issued by the CWA, with extremely torrential rain warnings in Yilan County, Hualien County, Hsinchu County, and Taichung. Torrential rain warnings in Keelung, Taipei, New Taipei City, and Nantou County. Extremely heavy rain warnings in Taoyuan, Miaoli County, Kaohsiung, and Pingtung County, and heavy rain warnings in Yunlin County, Chiayi, Chiayi County, and Tainan. Typhoon warnings were issued all around the country. Multiple large wave warnings and a singular surge warnings were issued, all in the eastern coast of Taiwan. All offices and schools in Taiwan were closed on October 31. A group of 27 visitors at Wuling Farm, Taichung, were told to stay while descending, with the tourists being provided food and water. Another group of 26 tourists were told to stay put in a guesthouse at Mount Li. Another group of 24 tourists were also forced to return to a mountain after trying to leave the mountain. 134 emergency shelters were established, accommodating 2,620 individuals, while trading of publicly listed shares was suspended due to the storm.

=== Elsewhere ===
In anticipation of the storm's effects, railway and maritime authorities in China suspended several train services and canceled 71 coastal passenger ferry routes. The National Meteorological Center of CMA issued an orange alert for the storm, warning that it was expected to bring torrential rains to eastern areas, including Fujian, Zhejiang, Jiangsu provinces, and Shanghai. In Zhejiang, 280,000 people were evacuated while 10,000 emergency shelters were opened. The Ministry of Water Resources initiated a Level-IV emergency response to manage the risk of flooding and the impacts of the storm expected to hit Shanghai. Kong-rey was not predicted to hit the Korean Peninsula, but it was expected to bring significant rainfall to the southern regions due to its moisture. The Jeju Regional Meteorological Administration issued alerts for heavy rain and strong winds across all land areas of Jeju Island. The storm was also predicted to hit Japan. Residents were warned in Okinawa Prefecture against the high winds and rains. Authorities urged people to monitor the storm.

== Impact and aftermath ==
=== Philippines ===
The trough or extension of Kong-rey impacted the Visayas and various regions in Luzon and Mindanao. The Office of Civil Defense reported that Kong-rey caused the most extensive destruction in the island province of Batanes. At least 545 families consisting of approximately 1,575 individuals were evacuated in Batanes following the onslaught of the typhoon. Kong-rey triggered storm surges that flooded several houses in Ilocos Norte, Cagayan, and Batanes, displacing about 100 families and causing significant destruction, including to the historic Itbayat Church, the oldest church in Itbayat, Batanes. Two seaports in the town also sustained damage. Rockslides took place in Ivana and Sabtang, causing nearly 1,500 houses to be destroyed in Batanes. The air assets of the Armed Forces of the Philippines were ready to airlift relief goods and other supplies to areas affected by Kong-rey. At least twelve electric cooperatives were impacted by the damage caused by the storm. The Department of Social Welfare and Development provided 14,000 family food packs to the island province of Batanes.

On November 1, a C-295 transport aircraft of the Philippine Air Force carrying the said aid skidded off the runway of Basco Airport during landing, causing one of its tires to detach and leading to the closure of the airport until November 3. The Philippine Coast Guard vessel BRP Gabriela Silang was dispatched to Batanes to deliver additional aid after it had been forced to shelter due to bad weather in Sual, Pangasinan. The Department of Education announced that it would roll out the Dynamic Learning Program in November to address learning loss caused by class disruptions from Tropical Storm Trami (Kristine) and Kong-rey. During the 11th anniversary of Typhoon Haiyan (Yolanda), President Bongbong Marcos emphasized the importance of avoiding complacency in disaster preparedness, noting that the country was still recovering from Trami and Kong-rey. The South Korean government provided aid valued at ₱30 million (US$609,137.06) through the World Food Programme to assist those affected by Tropical Storm Trami (Kristine) and other recent storms, including Typhoon Kong-rey (Leon), Typhoon Yinxing (Marce), Typhoon Usagi (Ofel), and Typhoon Toraji (Nika). Although the NDRRMC did not provide specific details on the number of deaths caused by Kong-rey, the combined effects of Trami and Kong-rey led to at least 162 fatalities, with many others still unaccounted for.

==== Relation to climate change ====
A study by World Weather Attribution in December 2024 examined the impact of six consecutive typhoons that had affected Luzon between late October and November, including Tropical Storm Trami and Typhoons Kong-rey, Yinxing, Toraji, Usagi, and Man-yi. Using statistical modeling, scientists projected that the frequency of at least three Category 3–5 typhoons hitting the Philippines in a year had decreased to once every 15 years with a 1.3 °C (2.3 °F) rise in sea surface temperatures. Furthermore, this frequency will decrease into once every 12 years if the temperature rose by 2 °C (3.6 °F) compared to pre-industrial temperatures. They concluded that climate change has increased the probability of at least three Category 3–5 typhoons hitting the Philippines in a year.

=== Taiwan ===
Kong-rey making landfall in Chenggong, Taitung in eastern Taiwan on October 31

In Taiwan, two people were killed in Taipei, including one when an electrical pole fell over. A woman also died when a tree fell into her car in Nantou County. At least 690 people were injured, and four who were initially missing were later found and rescued across the island due to the storm. Major precipitation was measured in Hualien, with 119.5 millimetres (4.70 inches) falling in a single hour. 965,342 houses lost power, while 63,016 others lost access to water according to the Central Emergency Operation Center, which also counted 10,831 cases of damage, ten roads blocked and 108 areas flooded. Mudslides and landslides happened across the country, with overflowing rivers, blocked roads, and a destroyed bridge in Fuli Township. In Hualien City and Zhuoxi, more than 300 mm (12 in) of rain fell in a 24-hour period, resulting in mudslides that obstructed roads and damaged infrastructure. The National Fire Agency counted at least 34 mudslides, 162 buildings damaged and 366 fallen trees due to the storm. The estimated loss of agricultural products and private facilities was NT$2.41 billion (US$75.6 million). The cargo vessel Yu Zhou Qi Hang, carrying three cranes and 284 tonnes of fuel, ran aground on the Yehliu Geopark, raising concerns of an oil spill. All 17 crew were rescued. Three passenger aircraft experienced hard landings at Taiwan Taoyuan International Airport and Kaohsiung International Airport during the storm, but did not sustain damage.

Several indigenous communities along the Central Cross-Island Highway in Taroko National Park were isolated by landslides, prompting the National Airborne Service Corps to airdrop humanitarian supplies to those affected. The Silks Place Taroko hotel, the park's only five-star accommodation, was forced to close until 15 January 2025 after its water and electricity supplies were cut. The closure occurred more than a month after the hotel reopened following extensive repairs in the aftermath of the 2024 Hualien earthquake in April.

=== China ===
After making landfall in East China, Kong-rey brought strong winds and heavy rains to the provinces of Zhejiang and Fujian, with Zhejiang recording an average of 70.7 mm (2.78 in) of rainfall. In Putian, solar panels on the roof of a residential building were blown away.

425,000 people in Zhejiang, Fujian, Jiangsu and Shanghai were affected by the typhoon, more than 30 houses collapsed and damaged, 54,800 hectares of crops were affected. Total direct economic losses in China were 650 million yuan (US$91.3 million).

=== Elsewhere ===
On Jeju Island, South Korea, up to 268.5 mm (10.57 in) of rain was recorded in Hallasan, resulting in flooding which caused damage to buildings across the island.

The Japan Meteorological Agency reported that warm, moist air from the storm was bringing heavy rainfall and thunderstorms to western Japan, causing Matsuyama to issue a highest-level alert that called for the evacuation of 189,552 residents. Rains caused a suspension of Shinkansen services between Tokyo and Fukuoka. Overall, flooding damaged 56 structures across the country, and left one person missing in Hiroshima Prefecture.

== Retirement ==
On February 20, 2025, PAGASA retired the name Leon from its rotating naming lists on account of the contributing damages with Tropical Storm Trami and will never be used again as a typhoon name within the Philippine Area of Responsibility (PAR). It will be replaced with Lekep — Maranao word for Fog — for the 2028 season.

At their 57th Session in February 2025, the ESCAP/WMO Typhoon Committee announced that the name Kong-rey, along with eight others, would be retired from the naming lists for the Western Pacific. In the spring of 2026, the name was replaced with Koki.

== See also ==
- Weather of 2024
- Tropical cyclones in 2024
- List of Philippine typhoons (2000–present)
