= Yinxing =

Yinxing may refer to:

- Ginkgo biloba
- Typhoon Yinxing
