= Typhoon Toraji (2024) =

Pacific typhoon in 2024

Typhoon Toraji (Nika)
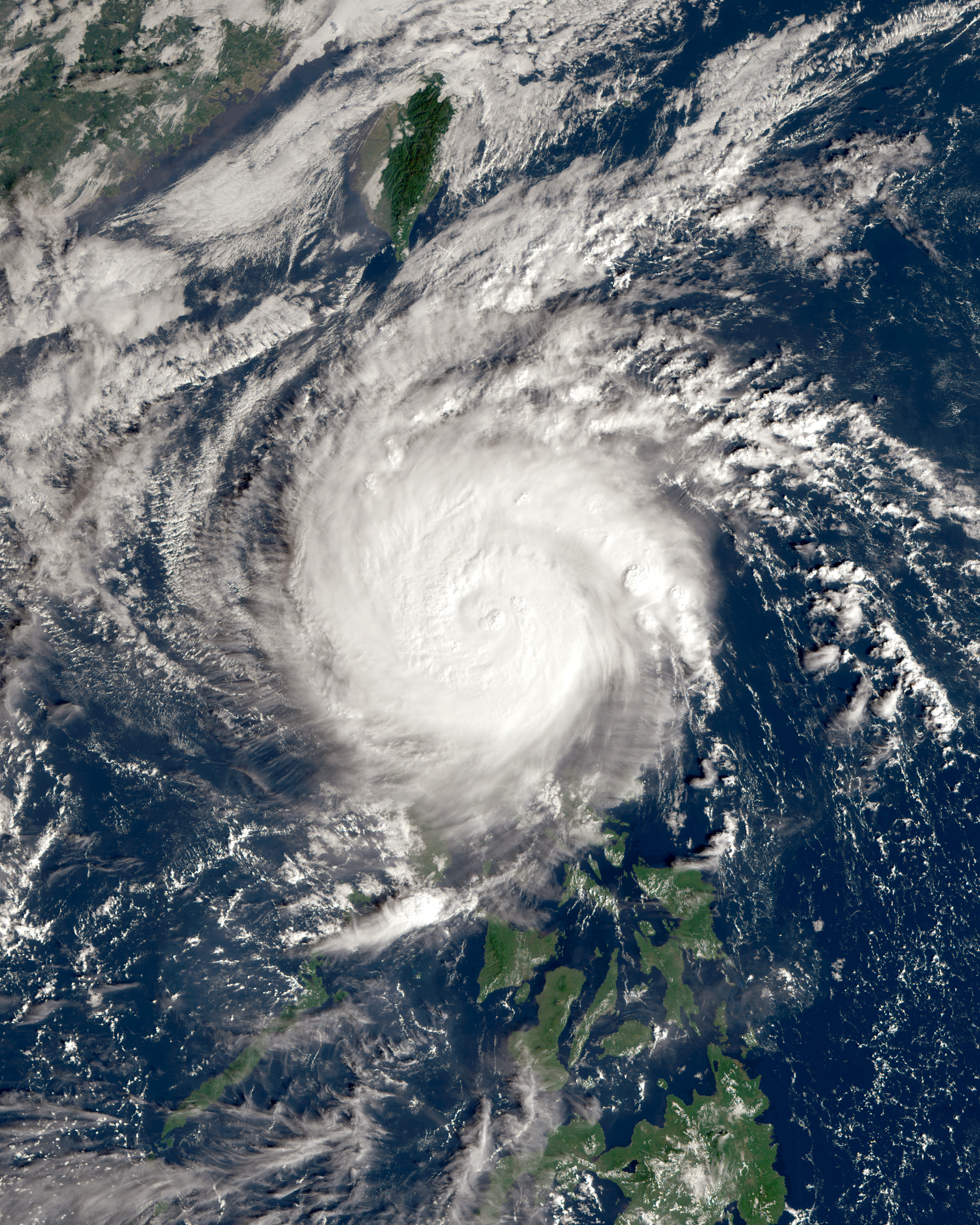
- Typhoon Toraji making landfall over Dilasag, Aurora at its peak intensity on November 11

Meteorological history
- Formed: November 8, 2024
- Dissipated: November 15, 2024

Typhoon
- 10-minute sustained (JMA)
- Highest winds: 130 km/h (80 mph)
- Lowest pressure: 980 hPa (mbar); 28.94 inHg

Category 1-equivalent typhoon
- 1-minute sustained (SSHWS/JTWC)
- Highest winds: 150 km/h (90 mph)
- Lowest pressure: 970 hPa (mbar); 28.64 inHg

Overall effects
- Fatalities: 4
- Injuries: 2
- Damage: $7.76 – 73.78 million (2024 USD)
- Areas affected: Philippines
- IBTrACS
- Part of the 2024 Pacific typhoon season

Typhoon Toraji, (Note: The name Toraji (Korean: 도라지, [to̞ɾa̠d͡ʑi]) was contributed by North Korea and refers to a type of bellflower (Platycodon grandiflorus) in Korean.) known in the Philippines as Typhoon Nika, was a fairly strong tropical cyclone that is the fourth tropical cyclone in a series to impact the Philippines in mid-November 2024, following Tropical Storm Trami and Typhoons Kong-rey, Yinxing, Usagi, and Man-yi which had occurred just a few days earlier. Additionally, it was also part of the four tropical cyclones to simultaneously exist in the Western Pacific during the month of November, the first occurrence since records began in 1951; the other three were Yinxing, Usagi, and Man-yi.

The twenty-third named storm and tenth typhoon of the annual typhoon season, Toraji, developed into a low-pressure area and later into a tropical depression north of Yap on November 8. It moved into the Philippine Area of Responsibility, and PAGASA named the depression Nika the following day. The Japan Meteorological Agency (JMA) then upgraded the system to a tropical storm, naming it Toraji. Satellite imagery shows that Toraji was undergoing rapid intensification, with a small system displaying an elongated, compact central dense overcast feature, measuring around 81–92 miles (130–148 km) in diameter. On November 10, the JMA upgraded the system to a typhoon. The agency reported that by 18:00 UTC, the system had reached its peak intensity, with 10-minute sustained winds of 130 km/h (80 mph) and a central pressure of 975 hPa (28.79 inHg). The Joint Typhoon Warning Center (JTWC) indicated that the system peaked at Category 1-equivalent intensity on the Saffir–Simpson scale, with 1-minute sustained winds of 150 km/h (90 mph). The following day, Toraji made landfall on Dilasag, Aurora, on Luzon Island, before moving inland over mountainous terrain, resulting in significant weakening. Later that evening, Toraji emerged over the South China Sea, with satellite imagery revealing a tightly wrapped low-level circulation and fragmented deep convection beginning to reorganize over the northern semicircle. Satellite imagery showed a weakening of deep convection at the storm's center, with low-level cloud banding around the center and along the southern edge of the circulation, resulting from strong southerly vertical wind shear as it became embedded in the low-level northeasterly flow associated with a cold surge. The JMA continued to monitor the system until it was last noted at 06:00 UTC on November 15.

As the storm approached the northern Philippines, evacuation orders were issued for residents in 2,500 villages. PAGASA raised Tropical Cyclone Wind Signals for several areas, and schools were suspended in various regions due to the storm's effects. A red alert warning was issued for Aurora, while officials in Aurora and Isabela reported fallen trees and power lines as the main impacts, blocking major roads. In Hong Kong, the Hong Kong Observatory raised Storm Signal No. 8 on the latest calendar date ever recorded, surpassing the previous record set by Typhoon Pamela in 1972. At least four people were killed by the storm, while two others were injured. Damages from the storm amounted to US$7.76–73.78 million.

== Meteorological history ==
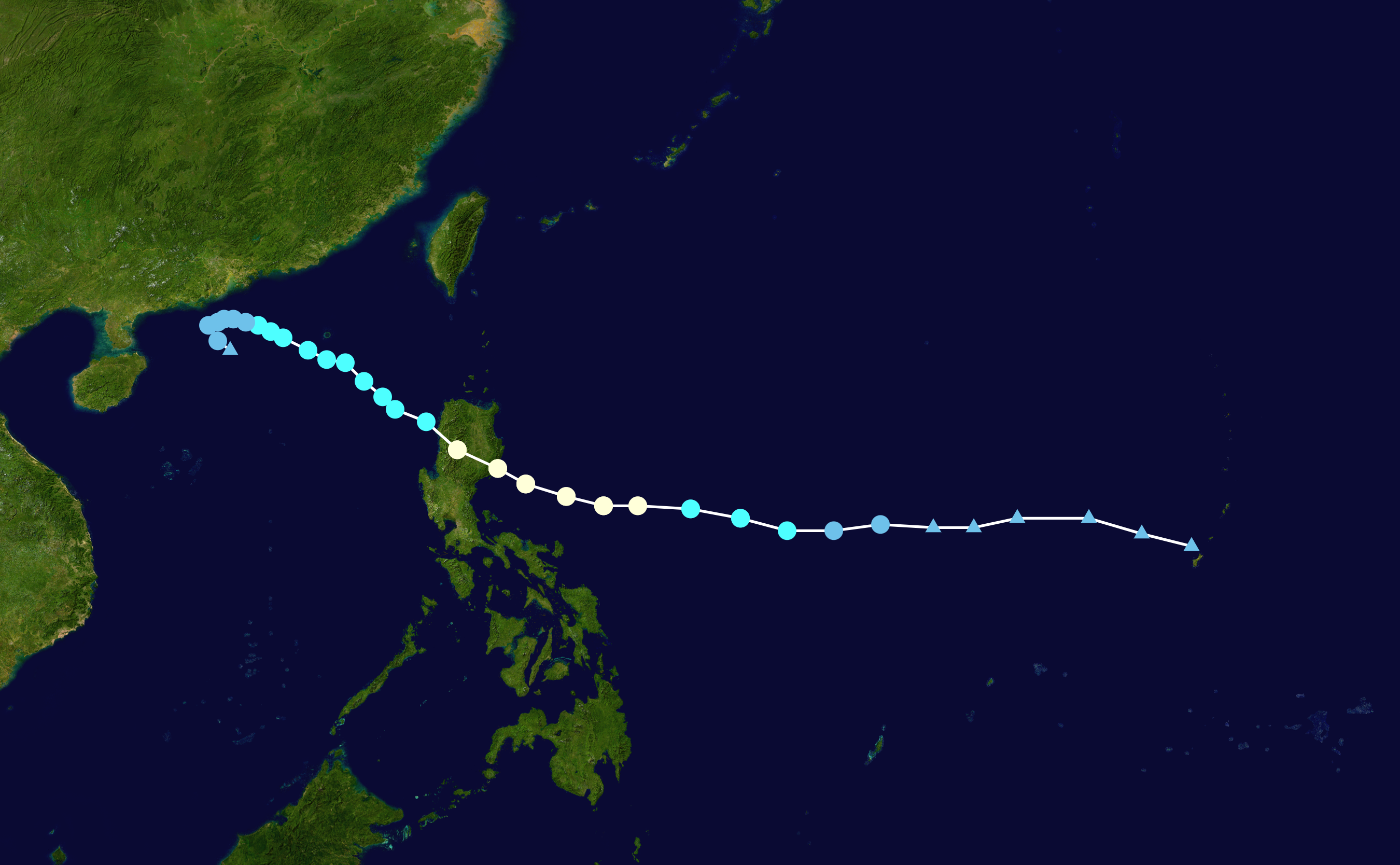
Map plotting the storm's track and intensity, according to the Saffir–Simpson scale Map key Saffir–Simpson scale Tropical depression (≤38 mph, ≤62 km/h) Tropical storm (39–73 mph, 63–118 km/h) Category 1 (74–95 mph, 119–153 km/h) Category 2 (96–110 mph, 154–177 km/h) Category 3 (111–129 mph, 178–208 km/h) Category 4 (130–156 mph, 209–251 km/h) Category 5 (≥157 mph, ≥252 km/h) Unknown Storm type Tropical cyclone Subtropical cyclone Extratropical cyclone, remnant low, tropical disturbance, or monsoon depression

The origins of Typhoon Toraji can be traced back to November 8, when the Japan Meteorological Agency (JMA) reported that a low-pressure area had formed 620 km (386 mi) north of Yap, with satellite imagery showing an organizing low-level circulation center, obscured by flaring convection wrapping around its southern and western peripheries. Environmental analysis indicated a favorable environment for further development, with sea surface temperatures of 30–31 °C (86–88 °F), strong poleward outflow aloft, and low vertical wind shear. At 18:00 UTC on the same day, the JMA classified the system as a tropical depression, and it moved into the Philippine Area of Responsibility, where PAGASA named it Nika the following day. By 02:00 UTC, the United States Joint Typhoon Warning Center (JTWC) issued a tropical cyclone formation alert. At 06:00 UTC the same day, the JMA upgraded the system to a tropical storm named Toraji, which the JTWC later designated as 26W. Satellite imagery shows that Toraji was undergoing rapid intensification, with a small system displaying an elongated, compact central dense overcast (CDO) feature, measuring around 81–92 miles (130–148 km) in diameter. A microwave imaging reveals a complete eyewall surrounding a small microwave eye feature, along with a deep convective band over the southern quadrant.

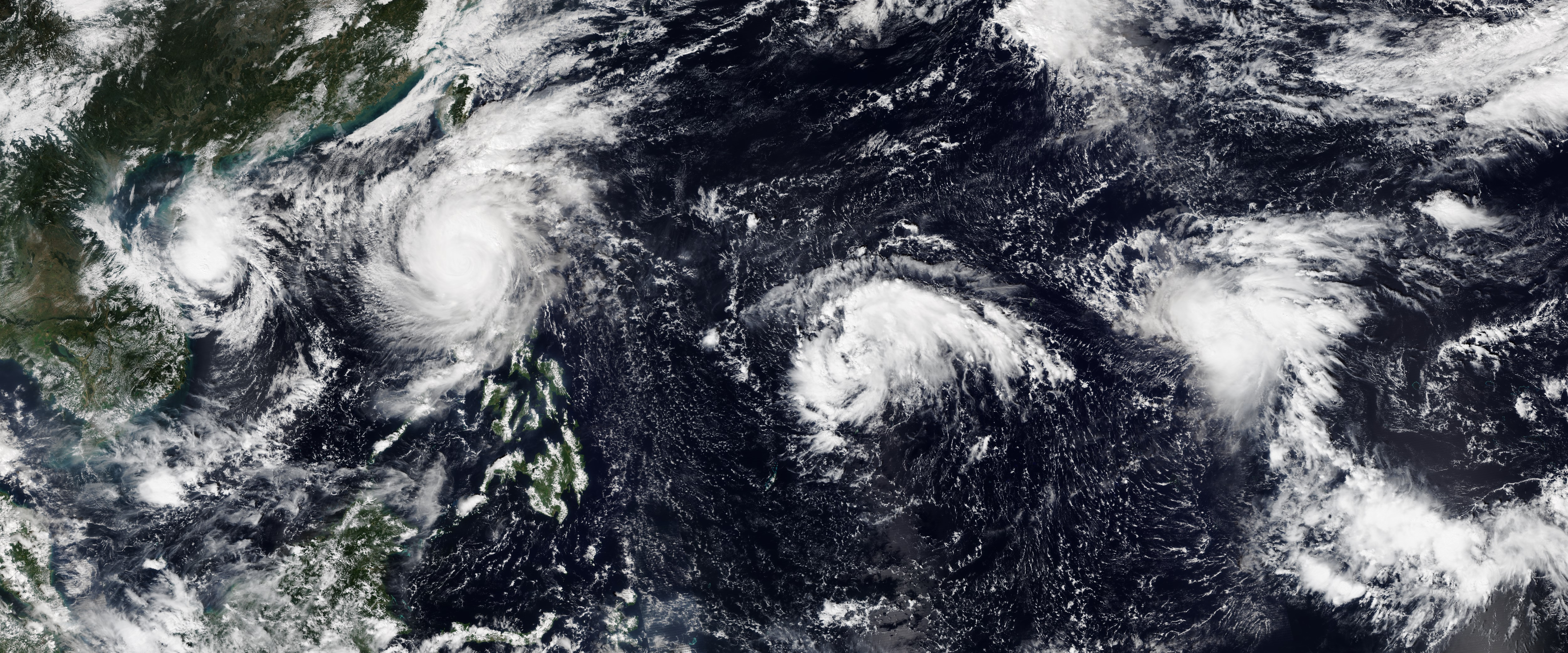
Four simultaneously active tropical cyclones on November 11. From left to right: Yinxing, Toraji, Usagi, and Man-yi, the first occurrence since 1951

Early the next day, the JMA upgraded it to a severe tropical storm as it moved west-northwestward, with formative bands wrapping tighter around the obscured low-level circulation. At 09:00 UTC on that day, the JTWC upgraded the storm to a minimal typhoon, noting a more asymmetric CDO in the eastern quadrant. Satellite imagery reveals a decrease in easterly vertical wind shear, with the CDO becoming more symmetric and building back over the low-level circulation center. At 15:00 UTC on the same day, the JMA upgraded Toraji to a typhoon. The agency reported that by 18:00 UTC, the system had reached its peak intensity, with 10-minute sustained winds of 130 km/h (80 mph) and a central pressure of 975 hPa (28.79 inHg). Toraji eventually peaked at Category 1-equivalent intensity on the Saffir–Simpson scale, with 1-minute sustained winds of 150 km/h (90 mph). On November 11, Toraji made landfall on Dilasag, Aurora, on Luzon Island at around 8:10 AM PHT (00:10 UTC), before moving inland over mountainous terrain, which caused significant weakening. Later that evening, Toraji emerged over the South China Sea off the coast of Magsingal, Ilocos Sur, with satellite imagery showing a tightly wrapped low-level circulation and fragmented deep convection beginning to reorganize over the northern semicircle. As it moved northwestward along the southwestern periphery of a mid-level subtropical high, a small patch of deep convection developed over the northern portion of a partially exposed low-level circulation, resulting in the system weakening into a tropical storm on November 11. Satellite imagery showed a weakening of deep convection at the storm's center, with low-level cloud banding around the center and along the southern edge of the circulation, resulting from strong southerly vertical wind shear as it became embedded in the low-level northeasterly flow associated with a cold surge. As a result of convective decapitation, which led to a fully exposed low-level circulation center, the JTWC issued its final warning on November 14 as it weakened to a tropical depression. The JMA continued to monitor the system until it was last noted at 06:00 UTC on November 15.

== Preparations ==
=== Philippines ===
==== Highest Tropical Cyclone Wind Signal ====
Highest Tropical Cyclone Wind Signal issued by PAGASA for Toraji (Nika) in each province. The white line represents the best track.

TCWS#	Luzon	Visayas	Mindanao
4	Northern and Central Portions of Ilocos Sur, Central and Southern Portions of Isabela, Extreme Northern Portion of Aurora, Central and Southern Portions of Abra, Kalinga, Mountain Province, Northern and Central Portions of Ifugao	None	None
3	Southern Portion of Ilocos Norte, Rest of Ilocos Sur, Northern Portion of Nueva Vizcaya, Northern Portion of Quirino, Southwestern Portion of Cagayan, Northern Portion of Aurora, Northern Portion of Benguet, Rest of Ifugao, Southern Portion of Apayao	None	None
2	Eastern Portion of Pangasinan, La Union, Central Portion of Cagayan, Rest of Nueva Vizcaya, Rest of Quirino, Central Portion of Aurora, Northern Portion of Nueva Ecija, Rest of Benguet	None	None
1	Rest of Pangasinan, Babuyan Islands, Rest of Cagayan, Rest of Nueva Vizcaya, Rest of Quirino, Bulacan, Northern and Central Portions of Zambales, Pampanga, Rest of Aurora, Tarlac, Rest of Benguet, Metro Manila, Eastern Portion of Laguna, Northern and Eastern Portions of Quezon, Polillo Islands, Rizal, Calaguas Islands, Camarines Norte, Camarines Sur, Catanduanes, Northern Portion of Albay	None	None

PAGASA warned of intense to torrential rains in the Cordillera Administrative Region and Cagayan Valley. It also issued Tropical Cyclone Wind Signal No. 1 for the rest of Cagayan, including the Babuyan Islands, Apayao, Abra, Ilocos Norte, Ilocos Sur, the rest of Pangasinan, La Union, the rest of Benguet, the rest of Aurora, Tarlac, the northern and central portions of Zambales, the rest of Nueva Ecija, Pampanga, Bulacan, Metro Manila, Rizal, the eastern portion of Laguna, the eastern portion of Quezon (including Polillo Islands), Camarines Norte, Camarines Sur, Catanduanes, and Albay. Signal No. 2 was upgraded for the northern portion of Aurora, Isabela, Quirino, the southern portion of mainland Cagayan, Nueva Vizcaya, the southern portion of Apayao, Abra, Kalinga, Mountain Province, Ifugao, Benguet, the northern portion of Nueva Ecija, the southern portion of Ilocos Sur, La Union, and the northeastern portion of Pangasinan. After Toraji intensified into a severe tropical storm, PAGASA raised Signal No. 3 for the southeastern portion of Isabela and the northern portion of Aurora, indicating an expected wind speed of 89–117 km/h (55–73 mph) within the next 18 hours. On November 11, the entirety of Kalinga, Mountain Province, the central and southern portion of Abra, Isabela, the northernmost portion of Aurora, northern and central portions of Ilocos Sur, and the northern portion of Ifugao, were upgraded to Signal No. 4, showing an expectation of winds of 89–117 km/h (55–73 mph). A gale warning was also issued for the coasts of eastern and northern Luzon.

With the storm approaching the northern Philippines, evacuation orders were issued for 2,500 villages affecting at least 8,000 people. A red alert warning was issued for Aurora. Classes were suspended in various areas due to the effects of the storm. DILG Secretary Jonvic Remulla ordered all local government units threatened by Toraji to implement mandatory evacuations. The La Union Provincial Disaster Risk Reduction and Management Office began deploying some of the 16 teams prepared for the storm, while President Bongbong Marcos instructed the DPWH and DOTr to assist in positioning trucks and machinery from their private partners in areas along the path of Toraji. The Magat, Ambuklao and Binga Dams opened spillways as a precaution. An alarm was raised in Tuguegarao after water levels along the Cagayan River rose due to heavy rainfall. The Metropolitan Manila Development Authority suspended number coding in Metro Manila as well as the Pasig River Ferry Service on November 11. A total of 32,000 people were evacuated due to the storm. At least 5,220 people were evacuated in Isabela, while 5,244 others were evacuated in Aurora, and 482 in Nueva Vizcaya Around 40,000 people were evacuated in Cagayan. The Philippine Coast Guard's branches in the Ilocos Region and Cagayan Valley were placed on alert.

=== Elsewhere ===
In Hong Kong, the HKO raised the Standby Signal number 1 at 10:20 PM on November 11 followed by a Signal 3 at 2:40 PM on November 13 then a Signal 8 at 11:10 PM that same day lasting until 10:20 AM on November 14, the latest calendar date for a Signal 8 issuance ever on record, beating Typhoon Pamela in 1972. It was then lowered to Signal 3 at that time, then lowered to a 1 by 10:20 PM before all the signals were cancelled by 1:20 AM on November 15. The public was urged to avoid the shoreline and refrain from participating in water sports. In Macau, the SMG at 12:30 AM on November 12 issued Standby Signal 1, followed by a Signal 3 at 7 PM on November 13 before all of them were cancelled at 11 PM on November 14.

== Impact and aftermath ==
=== Philippines ===
Typhoon Toraji making landfall in Dilasag, Aurora on November 11

Officials in Aurora and Isabela reported that the main impact appeared to be fallen trees and power lines, which blocked major roads and at least 22 bridges. The mayor of Dilasag said that damage to agriculture in the town had reached "80 to 90 percent". Several bridges and roads in Cagayan and Quirino were also closed, along with 17 sections of road in the Cordillera Administrative Region. A rice field in Cordon, Isabela, was submerged by floodwaters caused by the storm. In Romblon, the roll-on/roll-off passenger vessel MV Maria Oliva ran aground, and 156 people were rescued. Nearly 700 people were stranded in ports directly affected by the typhoon. Two people drowned after being carried away by strong currents in Amulung, while two people died after being electrocuted in separate incidents in Echague and Santa Ana, Cagayan.

Four houses in Baggao were destroyed, while other areas in Cagayan were flooded after water levels along the Cagayan River reached 11.2 m (37 ft), about 4 m (13 ft) above normal. Knee-deep flooding also occurred in Santiago, Isabela. Extensive power outages occurred in Isabela. Officials in Ilagan estimated that agricultural damage in the city reached ₱9.75 million (US$197,957.36) affecting 336 ha (830 acres) of crops. Infrastructure damage in Cagayan Valley reached ₱50.82 million (US$1.03 million). The DSWD used aircraft from the Philippine Air Force to deliver aid to the Babuyan Islands. The South Korean government provided aid valued at ₱30 million (US$609,137.06) through the World Food Programme to assist those affected by Tropical Storm Trami (Kristine) and other recent storms, including Typhoon Kong-rey (Leon), Typhoon Yinxing (Marce), Typhoon Usagi (Ofel), and Toraji (Nika). The Taipei Economic and Cultural Office donated disaster relief supplies worth over ₱5 million (US$101,522.84) to the Philippines.

The National Disaster Risk Reduction and Management Council (NDRRMC) reported on November 15, 2024 that 419,923 people in five regions were affected, with 46,495 displaced from their homes. 2,922 houses were damaged while 292 others were destroyed, with most of the affected housing located in Cagayan Valley. Infrastructure damage in Central Luzon was valued at ₱320.66 million (US$6.51 million), while agricultural damage in the region reached ₱855,326 (US$17,367.03). A total of 164 road sections and 94 bridges were affected, while 21 seaports were closed. Power outages affected 71 cities and municipalities. Two people were injured related to Typhoon Toraji (Nika) and Usagi (Ofel). A state of calamity was declared in Dilasag, and in Paracelis, Mountain Province and in Cabagan, Isabela. However, in the NDRRMC's report on November 24, the damage of three typhoons Toraji (Nika), Usagi (Ofel) and Man-yi (Pepito) could reached ₱784.68 million (US$15.93 million) in agriculture, while infrastructure damage reached ₱2.85 billion (US$57.84 million) for a total of ₱3.63 billion (US$73.78 million). Additionally, 232 cities experienced power outages, and 123,441 houses were damaged. Flooding continued to impact at least 360 areas across the country.

==== Relation to climate change ====
A study by World Weather Attribution in December 2024 examined the impact of six consecutive typhoons that had affected Luzon between late October and November, including Tropical Storm Trami and Typhoons Kong-rey, Yinxing, Toraji, Usagi and Man-yi. Using statistical modeling, scientists projected that a 1.3 °C (34.3 °F) rise in sea surface temperatures would cause such an event to occur once every 15 years, with the likelihood increasing to every 12 years. They concluded that climate change has increased the probability of at least three Category 3–5 typhoons hitting the Philippines in a year.

== Retirement ==
On February 20, 2025, PAGASA retired the name Nika from the rotating naming lists on account of the contributing typhoons that carved a path of destruction in the country in November 2024, and it will never be used again as a typhoon name within the Philippine Area of Responsibility. It will be replaced with Nanolay — Gaddang creator and culture hero —for the 2028 season.

At their 57th Session in February 2025, the ESCAP/WMO Typhoon Committee announced that the name Toraji, along with eight others, would be retired from the naming lists for the Western Pacific. In 2026, the name replaced with Gaeguri, which means "frog" in Korean language.

== See also ==
- Weather of 2024
- Tropical cyclones in 2024
- List of Philippine typhoons (2000–present)
