= Typhoon Man-yi =

Pacific typhoon in 2024

Typhoon Man-yi (Pepito)
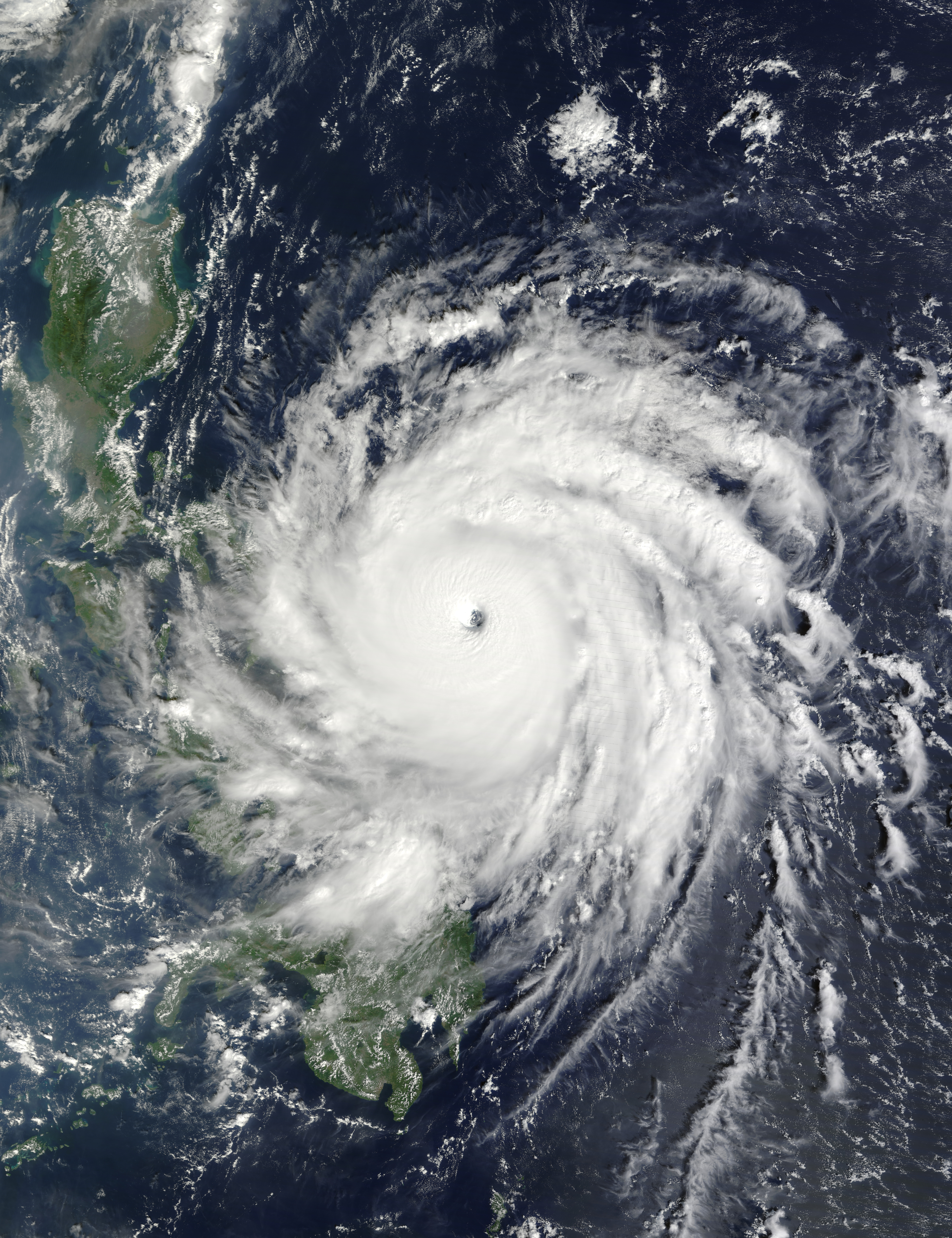
- Man-yi approaching east of the Philippines at peak intensity on November 16

Meteorological history
- Formed: November 7, 2024
- Dissipated: November 20, 2024

Violent typhoon
- 10-minute sustained (JMA)
- Highest winds: 195 km/h (120 mph)
- Lowest pressure: 920 hPa (mbar); 27.17 inHg

Category 5-equivalent super typhoon
- 1-minute sustained (SSHWS/JTWC)
- Highest winds: 260 km/h (160 mph)
- Lowest pressure: 924 hPa (mbar); 27.29 inHg

Overall effects
- Fatalities: 14
- Injuries: 15
- Missing: 2
- Damage: $65 million (2024 USD)
- Areas affected: Mariana Islands; Philippines
- IBTrACS
- Part of the 2024 Pacific typhoon season

Typhoon Man-yi, (Note: The name Man-yi (Cantonese: 萬宜, [maːn˨ jiː˨˩]) was contributed by Hong Kong and refers to High Island Reservoir in Cantonese.) known in the Philippines as Super Typhoon Pepito, was an extremely powerful, long-tracked, and destructive tropical cyclone that impacted the Philippines in mid-November 2024. Closely joining Tropical Storm Trami and Typhoons Kong-rey, Yinxing, Toraji and Usagi, Man-yi became the sixth and final consecutive tropical system to affect the country in less than a month. It was also part of the four tropical cyclones to simultaneously exist in the Western Pacific during the month of November, the first occurrence since records began in 1951; the other three were Yinxing, Toraji, and Usagi.

The twenty-fourth named storm, the third violent typhoon of the season, and the sixth super typhoon of the annual typhoon season, Man-yi originated from an area of convection 220 km (140 mi) east of Kwajalein Atoll on November 8. Satellite imagery showed a more organized low-level circulation center and persistent deep convection on the southwestern periphery. As the system moved northwestward, the Japan Meteorological Agency (JMA) upgraded it to a tropical storm, naming it Man-yi, as the system passed Guam on November 13. After spending several days as a tropical storm, the JMA upgraded it to a minimal typhoon on November 15, with the Joint Typhoon Warning Center (JTWC) following shortly thereafter. Early the next day, the JMA reported that the storm reached its peak intensity with ten-minute sustained winds of 195 km/h (120 mph) and a central pressure of 920 hPa (27.17 inHg). It subsequently peaked as a Category 5-equivalent super typhoon on the Saffir-Simpson scale, with one-minute sustained winds of 260 km/h (160 mph). As it moved west-northwestward, Man-yi made its first landfall in Panganiban, Catanduanes, later the same day. After making landfall in Catanduanes, the system slightly degraded in appearance, with the western half becoming less organized as it passed north of the Calaguas Islands. The eye of the typhoon had become more distinct, and its structure seemed to have recovered, with the development of a secondary eyewall, suggesting that the system was undergoing an eyewall replacement cycle, although the cycle could not be completed. The following day, Man-yi made its second landfall in Dipaculao, Aurora, on Luzon Island. The typhoon accelerated northwestward over the South China Sea, with its low-level circulation center partially exposed and fragmented convective bands occurring along the southern and eastern edges of the system. However, the storm rapidly deteriorated as it encountered a low-level northeasterly cold surge across the northern South China Sea and experienced increased vertical wind shear. The JMA continued to monitor it until it was last noted on November 20.

A tropical storm watch was issued for the Mariana Islands, prompting Guam to declare a state of emergency in preparation for the storm's arrival. A flood watch was also issued for parts of Guam and the Northern Marianas. In the Philippines, PAGASA raised Tropical Cyclone Wind Signals in several areas, while PHIVOLCS issued warnings about potential lahar flows from the Taal, Pinatubo, and Mayon volcanoes. Man-yi dumped 124 mm (4.9 in) of rain on northern Luzon within 24 hours, prompting the National Irrigation Administration to open six gates of the Magat Dam after recording a water inflow of 8,700 cubic meters (310,000 cu ft) per second — higher than the 7,100 cubic meters (250,000 cu ft) recorded during Typhoon Vamco (Ulysses) in 2020.

Due to the extensive damage and loss of life, PAGASA retired the name Pepito from its rotating naming lists. It will be replaced with Puwok — the Ifugao deity of typhoons — for the 2028 season. In February 2025, the ESCAP/WMO Typhoon Committee also announced the retirement of the name Man-yi from the naming lists for the Western Pacific. In March 2026, it was replaced with Dim-sum — a large range of small Chinese dishes — for future seasons. Overall, Man-yi was responsible for 14 deaths and approximately US$65 million in damages, particularly in Catanduanes and Nueva Vizcaya.

== Meteorological history ==
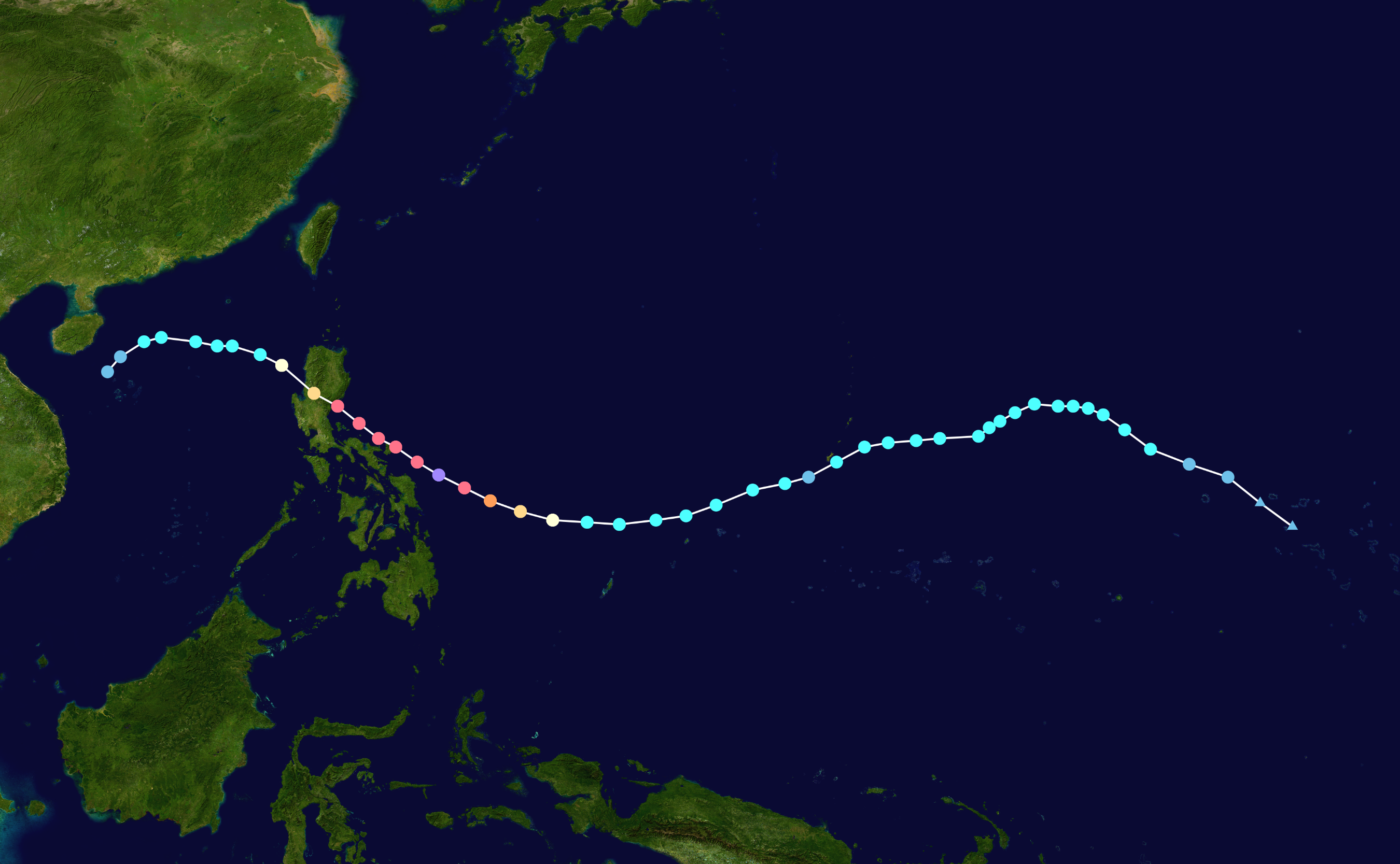
Map plotting the storm's track and intensity, according to the Saffir–Simpson scale Map key Saffir–Simpson scale Tropical depression (≤38 mph, ≤62 km/h) Tropical storm (39–73 mph, 63–118 km/h) Category 1 (74–95 mph, 119–153 km/h) Category 2 (96–110 mph, 154–177 km/h) Category 3 (111–129 mph, 178–208 km/h) Category 4 (130–156 mph, 209–251 km/h) Category 5 (≥157 mph, ≥252 km/h) Unknown Storm type Tropical cyclone Subtropical cyclone Extratropical cyclone, remnant low, tropical disturbance, or monsoon depression

Typhoon Man-yi emerged from an area of convection 220 km (140 mi) east of Kwajalein Atoll, with satellite imagery showing a more organized low-level circulation center and a persistent area of deep convection on the southwestern periphery on November 8. By 09:00 UTC, the United States Joint Typhoon Warning Center (JTWC) issued a tropical cyclone formation alert for the disturbance, noting a favorable environment for development due to low to moderate vertical wind shear, good divergence aloft, and warm sea surface temperatures of 29–30 °C (84–86 °F). The Japan Meteorological Agency (JMA) designated the disturbance as a low-pressure area on the same day, and the next day, it was upgraded to a tropical depression. Later that same day, the JTWC assigned the system the designation 25W, noting that it was a consolidating system with formative bands wrapping in from the north and a deepening cold central core that was obscuring the low-level circulation.

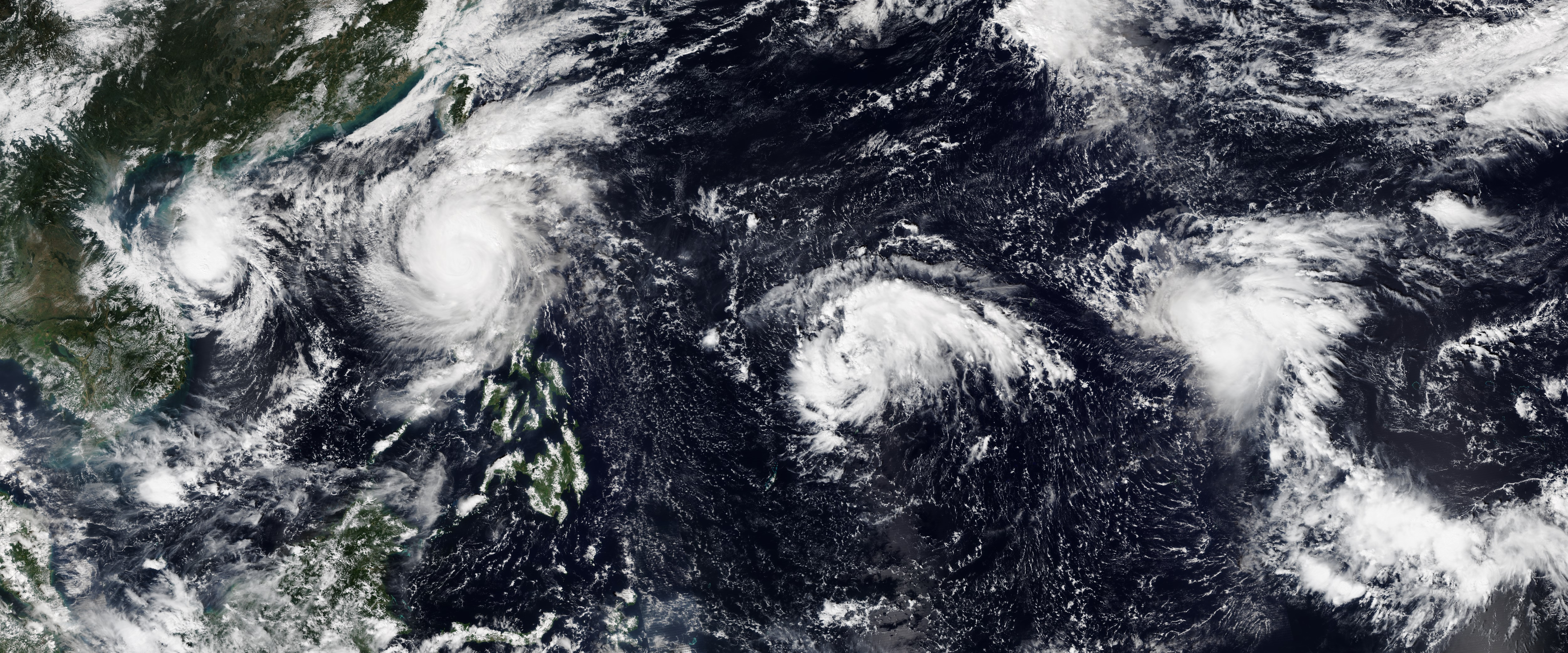
Four simultaneously active tropical cyclones on November 11. From left to right: Yinxing, Toraji, Usagi, and Man-yi, the first occurrence since records began 1951

As the system moved northwestward along the southern edge of a mid-level subtropical high, the JMA upgraded the system to a tropical storm named Man-yi at 06:00 UTC on the same day, with satellite imagery revealing a very compact system and the low-level circulation center partially exposed on the northwestern edge of a small central dense overcast (CDO). Man-yi wrapped around the northern and eastern quadrants of the circulation center, growing more intense as the vertical structure continued to align. The system became disorganized, with convection displaced to the southeast, but it eventually coalesced, as evidenced by cooling cloud tops in the central cold cover and a tightening wrap of the feeder band around the obscured circulation center as the system passed Guam on November 13. Early the next day, the JMA upgraded it to a severe tropical storm, citing Dvorak technique—a method of determining a tropical cyclone's intensity based on satellite appearance. It later moved into the Philippine Area of Responsibility, where PAGASA named it as Pepito. The storm displayed cooling cloud tops in its central cold region, with rain bands becoming more defined and tightening around the formation of a developing eye. On November 15, the JMA and the JTWC upgraded the storm to a minimal typhoon, with satellite imagery revealing a symmetric eyewall surrounding an oblong eye and spiral banding extending over the eastern semicircle.

Radar imagery of Typhoon Man-yi nearing landfall in Dipaculao, Aurora on November 17.

Early the next day, the JTWC upgraded the system to super typhoon status, with estimated 1-minute maximum sustained winds of 260 km/h (160 mph), making it a Category 5-equivalent super typhoon. Meanwhile, the JMA upgraded Man-yi to a violent typhoon, estimating its peak intensity with a minimum central pressure of 920 hPa (27.17 inHg) and 10-minute maximum sustained winds of 195 km/h (120 mph). The typhoon was characterized by a nearly symmetrical CDO extending 157–185 kilometres (98–115 mi), with the coldest cloud tops around −72 °C (−98 °F). As it moved west-northwestward, Man-yi made its first landfall in Panganiban, Catanduanes, on November 16 at around 9:40 PM PHT (13:40 UTC). After making landfall in Catanduanes, the system slightly degraded in appearance, with the western semicircle becoming less organized and the cloud tops warming as it passed north of the Calaguas Islands. Soon after, the typhoon's eye became more defined, with its structure appearing to have recovered. A secondary eyewall also began to develop, indicating that the system was in the process of an eyewall replacement cycle, though the cycle was unable to complete. The following day, Man-yi made its second landfall in Dipaculao, Aurora, on Luzon Island at around 3:20 PM PHT (07:20 UTC) and quickly moved inland.

Man-yi accelerated northwestward over the South China Sea, with its low-level circulation center partially exposed and fragmented convective bands occurring along the southern and eastern edges of the system. Satellite imagery revealed a rapidly weakening system, with the low-level circulation center partially exposed to the south of intense deep convection, leading the JMA to report that the storm had weakened into a severe tropical storm at 12:00 UTC on November 18. The deep convection associated with Man-yi was able to wrap around, fueled by localized outflow from the convective activity as it moved west-northwestward along the southwestern edge of a mid-level subtropical high. Man-yi rapidly deteriorated as the storm encountered a low-level northeasterly cold surge across the northern South China Sea and experienced increased vertical wind shear. The storm became mostly exposed and embedded in the stratocumulus field associated with the northeasterly cold surge, resulting in the JMA reporting that it weakened into a tropical storm on November 19. The system became fully exposed, with the central convection completely eroded. The JTWC issued its final warning on the same day as the system weakened to a tropical depression, while the JMA continued to monitor it until it was last noted at 06:00 UTC on November 20.

Typhoon Man-yi was part of the four tropical cyclones to simultaneously exist in the Western Pacific during the month of November, the first occurrence since records by the JMA began in 1951; the other three were Yinxing, Toraji, and Usagi. The appearance of four tropical cyclones at the same time was also the first time that happened in any month since seven years.

=== Relation to climate change ===
A study by World Weather Attribution in December 2024 examined the impact of six consecutive typhoons that had affected Luzon between late October and November, including Tropical Storm Trami and Typhoons Kong-rey, Yinxing, Toraji and Usagi, Man-yi. Using statistical modeling, scientists projected that a 1.3 °C (2.3 °F) rise in sea surface temperatures would cause such an event to occur once every 15 years, with the likelihood increasing to every 12 years. They concluded that climate change has increased the probability of at least three Category 3–5 typhoons hitting the Philippines in a year.

== Preparations ==
=== Philippines ===
==== Highest Tropical Cyclone Wind Signal ====
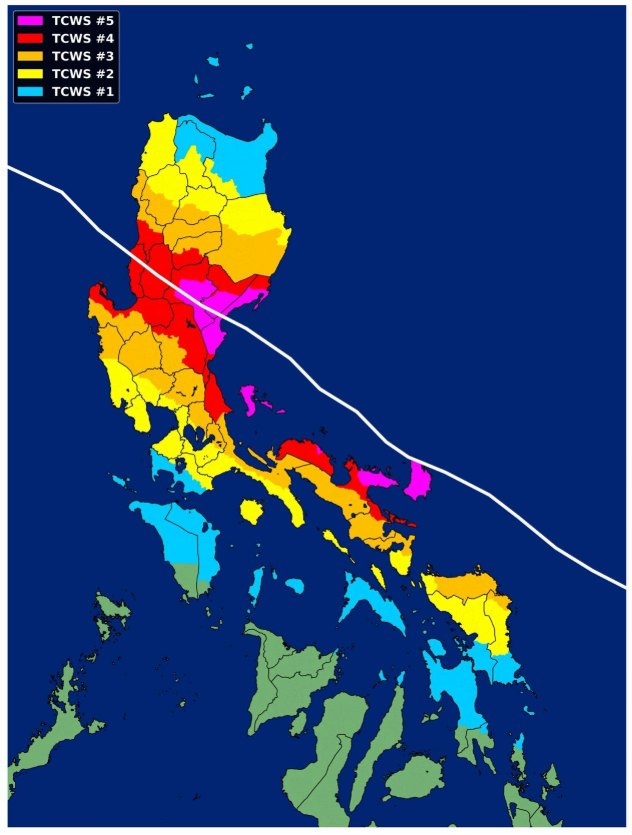
Highest Tropical Cyclone Wind Signal issued by PAGASA for Man-yi (Pepito) in each province. The white line represents the best track.

TCWS#	Luzon	Visayas	Mindanao
5	Southern Portion of Nueva Vizcaya, Southern Portion of Quirino, Central Portion of Aurora, Polillo Islands, Catanduanes, Calaguas Islands, Northern Portion of Camarines Sur	None	None
4	La Union, Northern and Central Portions of Pangasinan, Southern Portion of Ilocos Sur, Rest of Nueva Vizcaya, Rest of Quirino, Northern and Eastern Portions of Nueva Ecija, Rest of Aurora, Southern Portion of Ifugao, Benguet, Northern Portion of Quezon, Camarines Norte, Central Portion of Camarines Sur, Northern Portion of Albay	None	None
3	Rest of Ilocos Sur, Rest of Pangasinan, Southern and Central Portions of Isabela, Eastern and Central Portions of Bulacan, Eastern Portion of Pampanga, Northern Portion of Zambales, Tarlac, Mountain Province, Rest of Ifugao, Southern Portion of Abra, Southern Portion of Kalinga, Central Portion of Quezon, Northern and Central Portions of Rizal, Northern Portion of Laguna, Northern Portion of Sorsogon, Rest of Camarines Sur, Rest of Albay	Eastern and Central Portions of Northern Samar, Northern Portion of Eastern Samar	None
2	Ilocos Norte, Southwestern Portion of Cagayan, Rest of Isabela, Rest of Zambales, Bataan, Rest of Bulacan, Rest of Pampanga, Rest of Abra, Rest of Kalinga, Southern Portion of Apayao, Metro Manila, Cavite, Northern Portion of Batangas, Northern Portion of Laguna, Rest of Rizal, Rest of Laguna, Rest of Quezon, Marinduque, Burias Island, Rest of Sorsogon, Ticao Island	Rest of Northern Samar, Central Portion of Eastern Samar, Northern and Central Portions of Samar	None
1	Babuyan Islands, Rest of Cagayan, Rest of Apayao, Rest of Batangas, Lubang Island, Northern and Central Portions of Occidental Mindoro, Northern and Central Portions of Oriental Mindoro, Romblon, Masbate	Bantayan Islands, Extreme Northern Portion of Cebu, Northern and Central Portions of Leyte, Northeastern Portion of Southern Leyte, Biliran	Northern Portion of Dinagat Islands

Beginning November 14, PAGASA issued Tropical Cyclone Wind Signal No. 1 for Catanduanes and Northern Samar as well as parts of Camarines Sur, Albay, Sorsogon, Samar and Eastern Samar. Over the succeeding days, this was expanded to include an area stretching from Ilocos Norte in northern Luzon to the Dinagat Islands in northeastern Mindanao. The agency issued Signal No. 5, its highest warning level, for the whole province of Catanduanes, stating that winds of up to 185 km/h or higher were expected in 12 hours. PAGASA issued gale warnings for the eastern and southern seaboards of Luzon and eastern Visayas and also warned of storm surges with a height of up to 14 m (46 ft) affecting Cagayan Valley, Central Luzon, Calabarzon, Mimaropa, the Bicol Region and Eastern Visayas. PHIVOLCS warned of possible lahar flows from the Taal, Pinatubo, and Mayon volcanoes. After Man-yi made landfall in Catanduanes, PAGASA declared Signal No. 5 for parts of Polillo Islands and Calaguas Islands as it moved over the eastern section of Southern Luzon. As the storm approached Central Luzon, Signal No. 5 was raised over parts of Aurora, Nueva Vizcaya and Quirino.

President Bongbong Marcos warned officials to prepare for a "worst-case scenario" for the storm. The Land Transportation Franchising and Regulatory Board ordered the suspension of overland commercial passenger and cargo traffic passing through the port of Matnog, which connects Luzon with Visayas and Mindanao. It later extended the suspension to include bus journeys to the Bicol Region and advised against non-essential travel to Bicol, Central Luzon, Metro Manila, and Calabarzon. More than 1.2 million people were evacuated nationwide. Pre-emptive evacuations were announced in Quezon City, while forced evacuations were ordered in vulnerable areas of Nueva Ecija, Northern Samar, Camarines Norte, Camarines Sur, Calabarzon, Sorsogon, Eastern Samar and Catanduanes. At least 54 flights were cancelled along with several ferries.

The Philippine Coast Guard closed 55 seaports, stranding 3,912 people. 28 airports were also closed. The Ambuklao, Binga, San Roque and Magat Dams opened their gates as a precaution. The second day of the Grand Biniverse concert by Bini, which was scheduled on November 17 at the Araneta Coliseum in Quezon City, was instead moved to November 19, while three fun runs scheduled in Metro Manila on November 17 were also postponed along with games of the UAAP Season 87. Panic-buying occurred in Tacloban, Ligao and Nabua, while in Virac, Catanduanes, queues formed around a hardware store giving out free plywood and other materials to barricade against strong winds. A code white alert ordering public health personnel on standby for typhoonn relief was raised by the Department of Health, while the Armed Forces of the Philippines placed some of its units on red alert for disaster response mobilization. The Philippine National Police deployed nearly 13,000 personnel to assist in disaster response. A curfew was imposed in Naga, Camarines Sur, while electricity was preemptively turned off in Catanduanes. A red alert status was declared in Malabon and Baguio to fully activate emergency response plans, while authorities advised against non-essential travel to Baguio and Benguet. Vehicle number coding was suspended in Baguio. The Villa Verde Road connecting Pangasinan with Nueva Vizcaya was closed due to risks of landslides.

=== Elsewhere ===
A tropical storm watch was in effect for the Mariana Islands on November 12, with the Condition of Readiness at level 3 (COR 3), as Man-yi was located approximately 530 km (330 mi) east of Guam. The Guam Department of Education canceled classes, and government agencies began preparing for the storm as Man-yi approached. A state of emergency was declared as Guam prepared for the arrival of the storm. A flood watch was issued for parts of Guam and the Northern Marianas. Several ferry services were cancelled as Man-yi approached southern China.

== Impact ==
=== Philippines ===
Animated satellite loop of Typhoon Man-yi making landfall in Panganiban, Catanduanes on November 16 at the time of its peak intensity.

According to the National Disaster Risk Reduction and Management Council (NDRRMC) and PAGASA, Man-yi killed 14 people, 15 injuries, and left two others missing; nine died in the Cagayan Valley while five more were killed in the Bicol Region. The typhoon destroyed 16,433 homes and damaged 60,898 others in its path. An estimated 4,240,764 people were affected, with 163,065 displaced from their homes. Agricultural damage in the Philippines amounted to ₱12.89 million (US$261,775.96), while infrastructure damage reached ₱2.85 billion (US$57.95 million) for a total of ₱2.87 billion (US$58.21 million). However, as reported by the NDRRMC, the agricultural damage of the three successive typhoons (Toraji (Nika), Usagi (Ofel) and Man-yi) stood at ₱784.68 million (US$15.93 million), while infrastructure damage already reached ₱2.96 billion (US$60.11 million), for a total of ₱3.75 billion (US$76.05 million). Additionally, 232 cities experienced power outages. However, in Nueva Vizcaya, officials estimated that agricultural damage in the province reached ₱2 billion (US$40.61 million), while infrastructure damage reached ₱200 million (US$4.06 million).

Man-yi generated 124 mm (4.9 in) of rain in northern Luzon over a 24-hour period, prompting the National Irrigation Administration to open six gates of the Magat Dam after it recorded a water inflow of 8,700 cubic meters (310,000 cu ft) per second, which was higher than the 7,100 cubic meters (250,000 cu ft) recorded during Typhoon Vamco (Ulysses) in 2020. This, combined with heavy rains, caused extensive flooding in Cagayan Valley that reached 4 metres (14 ft). Water levels at the Buntun Bridge reached 11.5 m (38 ft), exceeding its critical level by 0.5 m (1 ft 8 in). Officials in Isabela said that flooding was mitigated by dredging on the Cagayan River in the wake of Vamco. The Office of Civil Defense reported that several areas in the Bicol Region were experiencing storm surges as Man-yi approached, with some buildings being flooded. It also reported "extensive" damage in Catanduanes, with a provincial official adding that six towns in the northern part of the island were "severely damaged". In the provincial capital Virac, the roof of the emergency operations center was damaged. Storm surges also occurred in the Polillo Islands and La Union. Some trees were toppled, and several houses were damaged in San Andres, Catanduanes, as Man-yi passed through the area. A few houses were damaged in coastal areas of Albay. Several houses and boats were destroyed in the Calaguas Islands.

They have not recovered from the previous storms when the [super] typhoon hit. It's been one calamity after another.

— Camille Gianan, Provincial Information Officer of Catanduanes, to Associated Press.

A tornado destroyed at least 12 houses and a chapel in Aparri and Pamplona, Cagayan. A flooded house in Santo Tomas, Isabela also caught fire. Heavy rainfall in Albay triggered a landslide in Polangui, blocking several roads. In Tiwi, Albay another landslide rendered the roads impassable to four-wheeled vehicles. Landslides also blocked roads in Mountain Province and Benguet. The Philippine Coast Guard (PCG) stated that 4,784 people were stranded in ports across the country. Albay and parts of Isabela, Aurora and Nueva Ecija were without power due to the onslaught of Man-yi. In Isabela, electric poles that had been restored after being toppled by Typhoon Toraji (Nika) were again toppled by Man-yi. Thirteen roads in Quirino were flooded, while several bridges were damaged. Knee-deep flooding occurred in Nueva Ecija. Heavy rains and strong winds were experienced in Palayan and Cabanatuan due to the storm. Some areas in Quirino also experienced power outages due to Typhoon Man-yi. In Ilagan, Isabela, strong gusts of wind were felt due to the storm. Extensive damage occurred in Nueva Vizcaya after the Magat River overflowed. A total of 77 road sections and 32 bridges were affected in the province. A 40 m (130 ft)-section of a dike burst along the Talavera River in Aliaga, Nueva Ecija, inundating 200 ha (490 acres) of farmland. Power outages in Catanduanes were expected to last for months. One person was reported dead after figuring in a vehicular accident caused by fallen internet wires in Daet and two people were reported injured in separate incidents in Aurora. Seven people were killed in a landslide in Ambaguio, Nueva Vizcaya that injured three others. One person was also reported missing in Nueva Vizcaya. Three people also went missing after their shanty was swept away by strong river currents in Nueva Ecija. Two people were killed in a landslide in Ifugao. A boulder destroyed a house in Dipaculao, burying three people alive. At least 8,000 homes were damaged or destroyed, and more than 100 cities and towns suffered power outages due to toppled electric poles.

== Aftermath ==
=== Philippines ===
President Bongbong Marcos during an aerial inspection of areas affected by Man-yi in Nueva Vizcaya on November 22

The government of Albay pledged ₱1 million (US$20,304.57) in financial assistance and provided mental health and psychosocial support to the citizens of Catanduanes. Catanduanes governor Joseph Cua said that the Sorsogon provincial government would provide construction materials and a medical team to Catanduanes following the landfall of Man-yi. The Philippine Air Force has deployed several units and placed others on standby to provide humanitarian assistance and disaster response in the wake of Man-yi. A state of calamity was declared in the provinces of Aurora, Isabela and Nueva Vizcaya as well as in the city of Tabuk, Kalinga. The Philippine Coast Guard opened a donation drive for those affected by the storm. The Department of Education mandated the immediate implementation of Alternative Delivery Modes in areas affected by Man-yi. The Philippine Navy vessel BRP Apolinario Mabini assisted in delivering essential relief supplies to the communities affected in Catanduanes. Two Lockheed C-130 Hercules aircraft of the Philippine Air Force were also deployed to Catanduanes to carry out relief missions for the typhoon victims.

The Department of Human Settlements and Urban Development allotted ₱15 million (US$304,568.53) for an emergency shelter response fund to support families whose homes were destroyed by the storm. The Department of Social Welfare and Development reported that it has delivered over ₱79 million (US$1.6 million) in humanitarian aid to families impacted by the storm. President Bongbong Marcos subsequently visited affected areas of Catanduanes and delivered ₱50 million (US$1.02 million) in aid to the province. He also urged government offices not to hold lavish Christmas parties in solidarity with victims on Man-yi and previous storms and to donate funds for the events to disaster relief instead. Marcos also delivered ₱50 million (US$1.02 million) in aid during his visit to affected areas of Bambang, Nueva Vizcaya. The Taipei Economic and Cultural Office donated disaster relief supplies valued at over ₱5 million (US$101,522.84) to the Philippines, while the United States announced the allocation of an additional US$1 million in funding to support humanitarian efforts in the country.

== Retirement ==
On February 20, 2025, PAGASA retired the name Pepito from the rotating naming lists on account of the contributing typhoons in the country in November 2024, as well as for this storm causing over ₱1 billion pesos in damage. It will be replaced with Puwok — Ifugao deity of typhoons — for the 2028 season.

At their 57th Session in February 2025, the ESCAP/WMO Typhoon Committee announced that the name Man-yi, along with eight others, were retired from the naming lists for the Western Pacific. In the spring of 2026, the name was replaced with Dim-sum, which means a large range of small Chinese dishes.

== See also ==
- Weather of 2024
- Tropical cyclones in 2024
- List of violent typhoons
- List of Philippine typhoons (2000–present)
