= Typhoon Yinxing =

Pacific typhoon in 2024

Typhoon Yinxing (Marce)
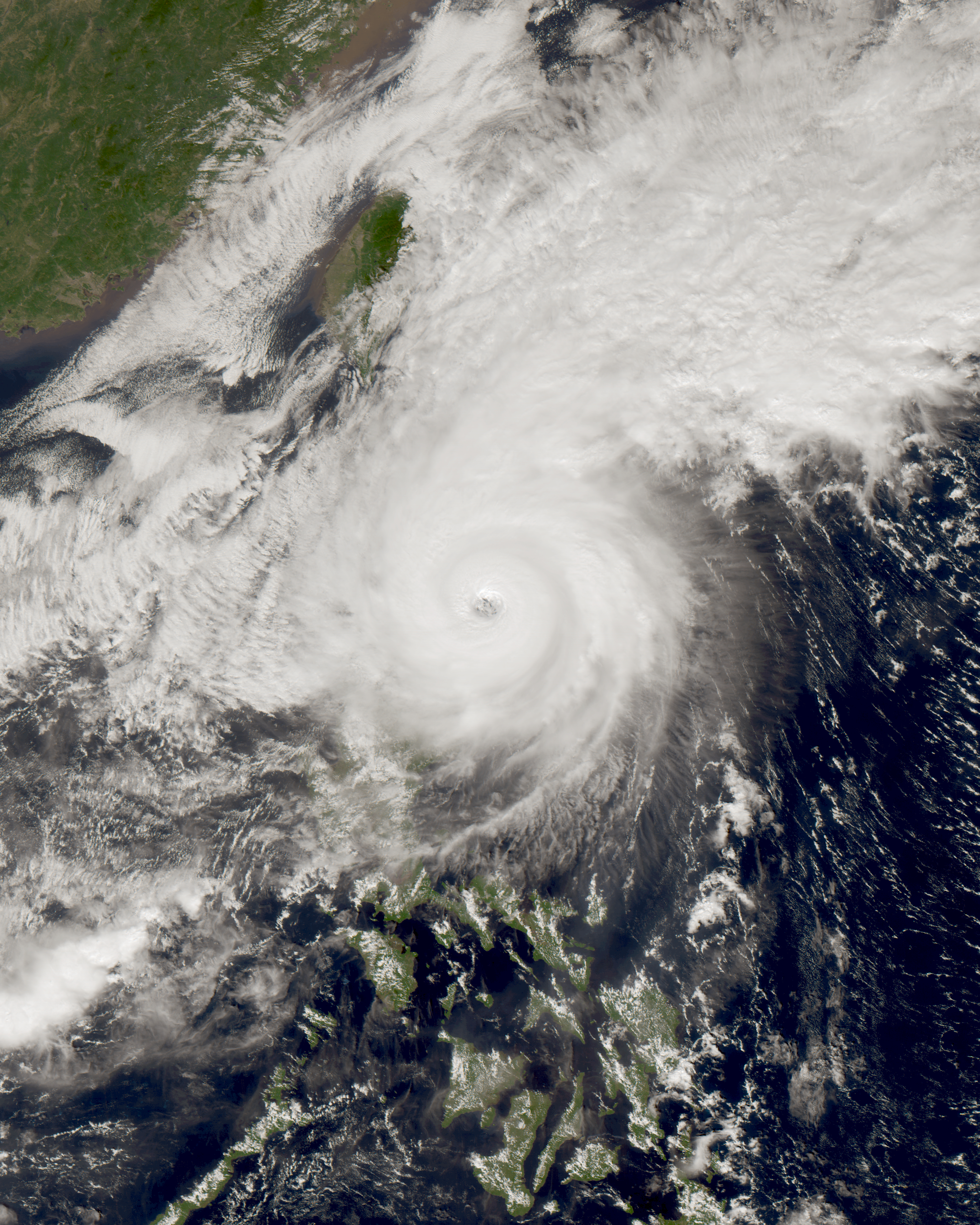
- Yinxing at near peak intensity shortly before landfall on November 7

Meteorological history
- Formed: November 2, 2024
- Dissipated: November 12, 2024

Very strong typhoon
- 10-minute sustained (JMA)
- Highest winds: 185 km/h (115 mph)
- Lowest pressure: 945 hPa (mbar); 27.91 inHg

Category 4-equivalent super typhoon
- 1-minute sustained (SSHWS/JTWC)
- Highest winds: 240 km/h (150 mph)
- Lowest pressure: 931 hPa (mbar); 27.49 inHg

Overall effects
- Fatalities: 1
- Injuries: 1
- Missing: 1
- Damage: >$9.63 million (2024 USD)
- Areas affected: Philippines, Vietnam
- IBTrACS
- Part of the 2024 Pacific typhoon season

Typhoon Yinxing, (Note: The name Yinxing (Mandarin: 银杏, [in˧˥ ɕiŋ˥˩]) was contributed by China and means ginkgo (Ginkgo biloba) in Mandarin.) known in the Philippines as Typhoon Marce, was a powerful tropical cyclone that impacted the Philippines before later affecting Vietnam in early November 2024. It was the third tropical cyclone in a series to impact the Philippines, following Tropical Storm Trami and Typhoon Kong-rey a few days earlier, and Typhoons Toraji, Usagi, and Man-yi only a few days after. Additionally, it was also part of the four tropical cyclones to simultaneously exist in the Western Pacific during the month of November, the first occurrence since records began in 1951; the other three were Toraji, Usagi and Man-yi.

The twenty-second named storm, tenth typhoon, and fourth super typhoon of the 2024 Pacific typhoon season, Yinxing developed from an area of convection 494 km (307 mi) east of Yap. On November 3, the Japan Meteorological Agency (JMA) upgraded the system to a tropical storm, as it exhibited improved convective banding tightly wrapping around the obscured low-level circulation center. As it moved slowly west-northwestward, the typhoon's eye became more circular in shape as it approached northeastern Cagayan. On November 7, the JTWC reported that the system had peaked at Category 4-equivalent super typhoon on the Saffir–Simpson scale, with one-minute sustained winds of 240 km/h (150 mph). The JMA noted that Yinxing reached its maximum strength with ten-minute sustained winds of 175 km/h (110 mph) and a central pressure of 940 hPa (27.76 inHg). On November 7, Yinxing made two landfalls in northern Luzon, first on Santa Ana, Cagayan, and after crossing the Babuyan Channel, on Sanchez Mira, Cagayan.

As the typhoon accelerated westward over the South China Sea, it weakened due to interactions with the terrain, while the spiral bands of convection continued to tightly wrap around the center and deep convection became organized into well-defined bands. At 07:00 UTC on November 12, it made landfall just north of Quy Nhon, Vietnam, and quickly moved inland. The JMA continued to track the system until it dissipated on the same day.

A red alert warning has been issued for Cagayan and Batanes as PAGASA cautioned of heavy rains, strong winds, and storm surges impacting northern Luzon. Additionally, more than 200 passengers have been affected by flight cancellations. Overall, Yinxing was responsible for one person reported dead, another injured, and one more reported missing, causing approximately US$9.63 million in damages.

== Meteorological history ==
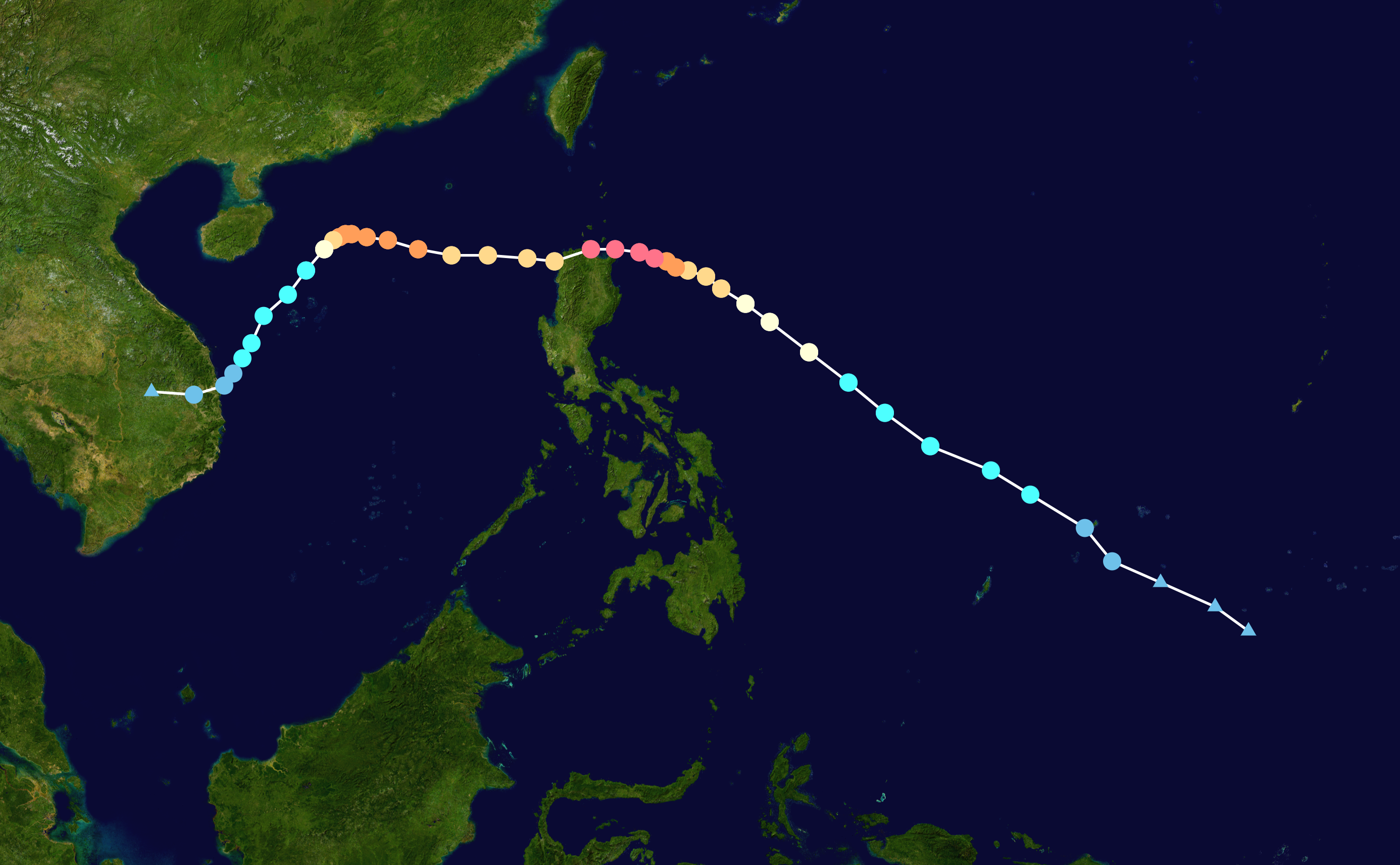
Map plotting the storm's track and intensity, according to the Saffir–Simpson scale Map key Saffir–Simpson scale Tropical depression (≤38 mph, ≤62 km/h) Tropical storm (39–73 mph, 63–118 km/h) Category 1 (74–95 mph, 119–153 km/h) Category 2 (96–110 mph, 154–177 km/h) Category 3 (111–129 mph, 178–208 km/h) Category 4 (130–156 mph, 209–251 km/h) Category 5 (≥157 mph, ≥252 km/h) Unknown Storm type Tropical cyclone Subtropical cyclone Extratropical cyclone, remnant low, tropical disturbance, or monsoon depression

Yinxing originated from an area of convection 494 km (307 mi) east of Yap, with satellite imagery showing the lower-level winds beginning to consolidate as the convective banding wraps around the low-level circulation center on November 2. At 00:00 UTC the following day, the Japan Meteorological Agency (JMA) classified the system as a tropical depression, and by 03:00 UTC, the United States Joint Typhoon Warning Center (JTWC) issued a Tropical Cyclone Formation Alert for the disturbance, citing a favorable environment for development characterized by low to moderate vertical wind shear, good divergence aloft, and warm sea surface temperatures of 29–30 °C (84–86 °F). Later that same day, the JTWC designated the system as 24W, due to its compact structure and a small burst of deep convection occurring near the circulation center, which revealed a nearly symmetrical and compact central dense overcast (CDO) with extremely cold cloud tops of −70 °C (−94 °F). At 18:00 UTC that same day, the JMA upgraded the system to a tropical storm named Yinxing, as it exhibited improved convective banding tightly wrapping around the obscured low-level circulation center.

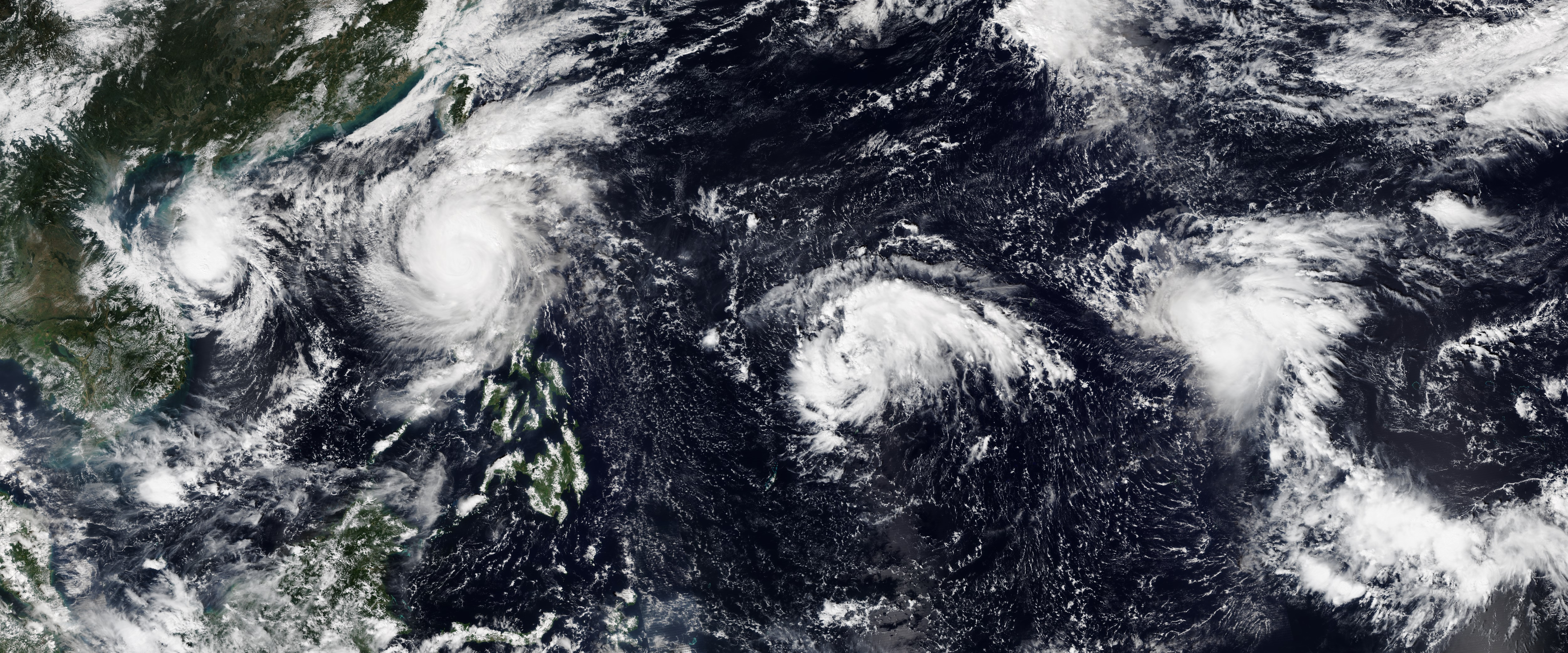
Four simultaneously active tropical cyclones on November 11. From left to right: Yinxing, Toraji, Usagi, and Man-yi, the first occurrence since 1951

At 05:00 PHT on November 4 (21:00 UTC on November 3), Yinxing moved into the Philippine Area of Responsibility, where PAGASA named it Marce. Microwave imaging revealed the development of a nascent microwave eye as Yinxing moved west-northwestward along the southwestern edge of a mid-level subtropical high, with the system being very compact and displaying a symmetrical and persistent CDO that obscured the circulation center. Early the next day, both the JMA upgraded it to a severe tropical storm, and the JTWC classified it as a minimal typhoon. Yinxing continued to slowly intensify in the Philippine Sea, with feeder bands wrapping more tightly into a symmetrical CDO and producing overshooting cloud tops. A pinhole eye also began to form, prompting the JMA to upgrade it to a typhoon at 00:00 UTC on November 5. The typhoon was slowly consolidating, featuring a 100-nautical-mile-wide (120 mi; 190 km) CDO and a developing, ragged eye, while microwave imagery revealed a strong northeasterly surge through the Luzon and Taiwan Straits, with deep convection continuing to prevail despite the moderate southwesterly vertical wind shear. As it moved slowly west-northwestward, the typhoon's 23-mile-wide (37 km) eye became more circular in shape as it approached northeastern Cagayan.

Typhoon Yinxing at the second peak on november 9.

On November 7, the JTWC reported that Yinxing had reached its peak intensity as a Category 4-equivalent super typhoon after reaching one-minute sustained winds of 240 km/h (150 mph), while the JMA indicated that Yinxing reached its peak intensity with 10-minute sustained winds of 175 km/h (110 mph) and a central minimum pressure of 940 hPa (27.76 inHg). Later that day, Yinxing made landfall on Santa Ana, Cagayan on Luzon island, around 15:40 PHT (07:40 UTC). After crossing the Babuyan Channel, Yinxing made its second landfall in Sanchez Mira, Cagayan, also on Luzon, at 21:00 PHT (13:00 UTC). As the typhoon accelerated westward over the South China Sea, it weakened due to interactions with the terrain. Yinxing's 25-nautical-mile-wide (29 mi; 46 km) cloud-filled eye became filled, while the spiral bands of convection continued to tightly wrap around the center. Deep convection started to beginning to organize into well-defined bands. The typhoon managed to overcome the dry air intrusion, leading to the redevelopment of a ragged CDO. It later developed into a more compact cold central cover with deepening overshooting cloud tops and a 19-nautical-mile-wide (22 mi; 35 km) eye that became increasingly symmetrical and sharply defined. Yinxing restrengthened, featuring a 22 miles (35 km) oblong eye and an eye temperature of 11.8 °C (53.2 °F). As a result, the JTWC assessed the storm's winds to have reached 205 km/h (125 mph) on November 9.

The next day, it was steadily weakening, with the CDO becoming more asymmetric due to cooler sea surface temperatures around 26 °C (79 °F) and increasing vertical wind shear. Moving southwestward between two mid-level subtropical high, the system's cold central cloud cover was quickly disrupted by strong southwestward vertical wind shear, which partially exposed the low-level circulation. As a result, the JMA reported that the storm weakened into a tropical storm at 00:00 UTC on November 11, with a broad, exposed low-level circulation and disorganized convection flaring over the northern quadrant. The system had a compact circulation center just offshore of the southern coast of Vietnam, with an eye-like feature surrounded by weak to moderate convective activity. At 07:00 UTC on November 12, the storm made landfall just north of Quy Nhon, Vietnam, and quickly moved inland, prompting the JTWC to issue its final warning. Afterwards, the JMA continued to track the system until it dissipated at 18:00 UTC on the same day.

== Preparations ==
=== Philippines ===
Yinxing approaching the Philippines on November 4

PAGASA warned of heavy rains, strong winds, and storm surges affecting northern Luzon. On the evening of November 4, PAGASA issued Tropical Cyclone Wind Signal No. 1 for Batanes, the northern and eastern portions of Cagayan including the Babuyan Islands, the eastern portion of Isabela, and the northern portion of Ilocos Norte. By November 5, Signal No. 2 was raised over Batanes, Apayao, the northern portions of Kalinga, Abra, Ilocos Norte, and Ilocos Sur. On November 6, Signal No. 3 was issued for parts of the northern and central portions of mainland Cagayan, including the Babuyan Islands, and the eastern portion of Apayao. The following day, PAGASA escalated the warning to Signal No. 4 for the northeastern portion of mainland Cagayan and the southeastern portion of the Babuyan Islands.

The Department of National Defense ordered local authorities to forcibly evacuate residents of isolated areas. Classes in various regions of Luzon have been canceled due to Yinxing, while more than 200 passengers have been affected by flight cancellations. The Armed Forces of the Philippines announced that it has prepositioned 305 search, rescue, and retrieval teams in anticipation for the effects of Yinxing. The Office of Civil Defense estimated that up to 24 million people could be impacted by Yinxing. Telecommunications company Globe Telecom prepared emergency supplies and personnel in areas where the storm was expected to hit. Flights and shipping from Calayan, Cagayan were suspended. At least 30,271 people were evacuated in Cagayan, with officials noting that Yinxing was the fourth storm to hit the province within the previous month. The National Irrigation Administration guaranteed that water would be released in a controlled manner from dams prior to Yinxing.

=== Elsewhere ===
In Taiwan, the Central Weather Administration warned that Yinxing could bring heavy rains in the east of the island, as well as in Keelung and Yilan County from November 7 to 9. In Hong Kong, the Hong Kong Observatory raised Typhoon Signal 1 at 4:40 UTC on November 8, and Signal 3 on November 9 at 7:40 UTC. The cross harbour swimming race in Victoria Harbour scheduled for November 10 was cancelled. In Macau, typhoon signal 1 was raised on November 8 on 3:00 UTC followed by Signal 3 on November 9 at 15:00 UTC.

== Impact and aftermath ==
=== Philippines ===
Directorate-General for European Civil Protection and Humanitarian Aid Operations (DG ECHO) daily situation map for the Philippines on November 8

Yinxing generated 242.6 mm (9.55 in) of rain in Cagayan over a 24-hour period. It also generated strong winds and flooding in Cagayan that damaged the market of Santa Ana, as well as houses, fishponds and schools in Buguey and closed bridges in Baggao and Peñablanca. Several bridges in Isabela were also closed due to rising water levels, while 64 sections of road in the Cordillera Administrative Region were also closed. Flooding also inundated all 13 barangays of Santa Teresita, Cagayan. Power outages occurred in Cagayan and Apayao. In Batanes, two airports and several seaports were damaged. More than 50 people were stranded in the province. According to the Philippine Ports Authority, the MV Aries and Panphil 8 ran aground on the shores of Currimao, Ilocos Norte, due to the typhoon. Parts of a seawall in Pagudpud were damaged. Parts of Adams were isolated due to damaged roads. President Bongbong Marcos provided more than ₱70 million (US$1.42 million) in livelihood and financial aid to thousands of residents impacted by Yinxing in Ilocos Norte. He also visited Cagayan, where he also gave out financial aid to affected residents. The DSWD used aircraft from the Philippine Air Force to deliver aid to the Babuyan Islands.

As of November 15, the National Disaster Risk Reduction and Management Council (NDRRMC) reported that 387,514 people in the Ilocos Region, Cordillera Administrative Region, and Cagayan Valley were affected, with 265 displaced from their homes. Additionally, 60 cities experienced power outages, and 28,940 houses were damaged. At least one person was reported dead, another was injured, and one more was reported missing. The fatality was found inside a damaged house in Claveria, Cagayan, while the missing and injured were on board a raft that capsized in Bantay, Ilocos Sur. The estimated damage to the agricultural sector was ₱16.25 million (US$329,905.19), with even higher losses in infrastructure, exceeding ₱176.48 million (US$3.58 million). Overall damage was ₱192.73 million (US$3.91 million). This differs from the ₱298 million (US$6.05 million) in agricultural damage recorded by the Department of Agriculture in Cagayan Valley alone. Telecommunications outages were reported in nine municipalities, and 76 sections of road and 27 bridges were rendered impassable. According to the NDRRMC, a state of calamity has been declared in the municipalities of Pagudpud in Ilocos Norte and Buguey in Cagayan due to the severe impact of the storm. The storm also damaged 26,901 houses and destroyed 1,136 others. The South Korean government provided aid valued at ₱30 million (US$609,137.06) through the World Food Programme to assist those affected by Tropical Storm Trami (Kristine) and other recent storms, including Typhoon Kong-rey (Leon), Typhoon Yinxing (Marce), Typhoon Usagi (Ofel), and Typhoon Toraji (Nika). The Taipei Economic and Cultural Office donated disaster relief supplies worth over ₱5 million (US$101,522.84) to the Philippines.

President Bongbong Marcos ordered all government agencies to be on high alert and cancelled his attendance at the APEC Peru 2024 summit scheduled on November 10 to 16 to focus on disaster response.

==== Relation to climate change ====
A study by World Weather Attribution in December 2024 examined the impact of six consecutive typhoons that had affected Luzon between late October and November, including Tropical Storm Trami and Typhoons Kong-rey, Yinxing, Toraji, Usagi, and Man-yi. Using statistical modeling, scientists projected that a 1.3 °C (34.3 °F) rise in sea surface temperatures would cause such an event to occur once every 15 years, with the likelihood increasing to every 12 years. They concluded that climate change has increased the probability of at least three typhoons reaching Category 3 status or higher hitting the Philippines in a year.

== See also ==
- Weather of 2024
- Tropical cyclones in 2024
- Timeline of the 2024 Pacific typhoon season
