= Tropical cyclones and climate change =

Impact of climate change on tropical cyclones

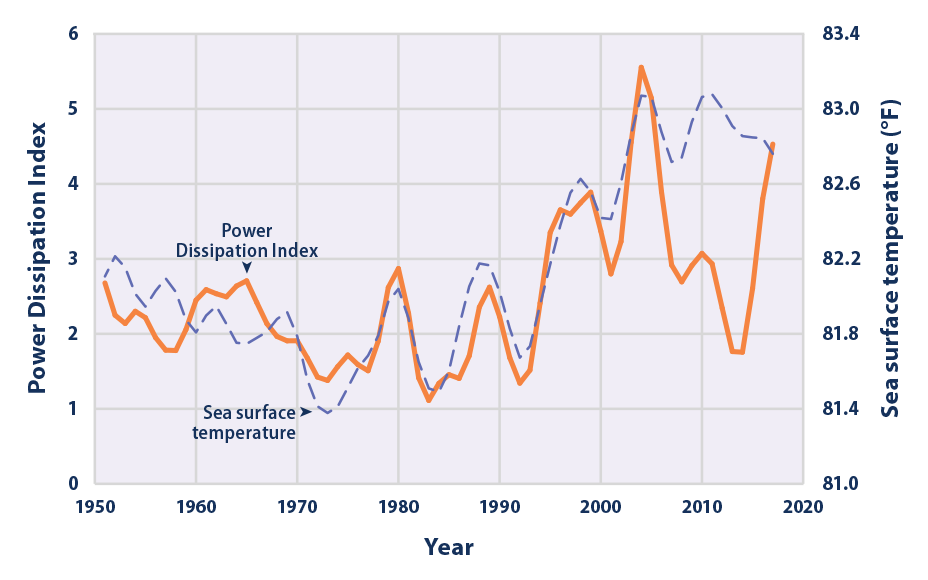
North Atlantic tropical cyclone activity according to the Power Dissipation Index, 1949–2015. Sea surface temperature has been plotted alongside the PDI to show how they compare. The lines have been smoothed using a five-year weighted average, plotted at the middle year.

Climate change affects tropical cyclones in a variety of ways: an intensification of rainfall and wind speed, an increase in the frequency of very intense storms and a poleward extension of where the cyclones reach maximum intensity are among the consequences of human-induced climate change. Tropical cyclones use warm, moist air as their source of energy or fuel. As climate change is warming ocean temperatures, there is potentially more of this fuel available.

Between 1979 and 2017, there was a global increase in the proportion of tropical cyclones of Category 3 and higher on the Saffir–Simpson scale. The trend was most clear in the north Indian Ocean, North Atlantic and in the Southern Indian Ocean. In the north Indian Ocean, particularly the Arabian Sea, the frequency, duration, and intensity of cyclones have increased significantly. There has been a 52% increase in the number of cyclones in the Arabian Sea, while the number of very severe cyclones have increased by 150%, during 1982–2019. Meanwhile, the total duration of cyclones in the Arabian Sea has increased by 80% while that of very severe cyclones has increased by 260%. In the North Pacific, tropical cyclones have been moving poleward into colder waters and there was no increase in intensity over this period. With 2 °C (3.6 °F) warming, a greater percentage (+13%) of tropical cyclones are expected to reach Category 4 and 5 strength. A 2019 study indicates that climate change has been driving the observed trend of rapid intensification of tropical cyclones in the Atlantic basin. Rapidly intensifying cyclones are hard to forecast and therefore pose additional risk to coastal communities.

Warmer air can hold more water vapor: the theoretical maximum water vapor content is given by the Clausius–Clapeyron relation, which yields ≈7% increase in water vapor in the atmosphere per 1 °C (1.8 °F) warming. All models that were assessed in a 2019 review paper show a future increase of rainfall rates. Additional sea level rise will increase storm surge levels. It is plausible that extreme wind waves see an increase as a consequence of changes in tropical cyclones, further exacerbating storm surge dangers to coastal communities. The compounding effects from floods, storm surge, and terrestrial flooding (rivers) are projected to increase due to global warming.

There is currently no consensus on how climate change will affect the overall frequency of tropical cyclones. A majority of climate models show a decreased frequency in future projections. For instance, a 2020 paper comparing nine high-resolution climate models found robust decreases in frequency in the Southern Indian Ocean and the Southern Hemisphere more generally, while finding mixed signals for Northern Hemisphere tropical cyclones. Observations have shown little change in the overall frequency of tropical cyclones worldwide, with increased frequency in the North Atlantic and central Pacific, and significant decreases in the southern Indian Ocean and western North Pacific. There has been a poleward expansion of the latitude at which the maximum intensity of tropical cyclones occurs, which may be associated with climate change. In the North Pacific, there may also have been an eastward expansion. Between 1949 and 2016, there was a slowdown in tropical cyclone translation speeds. It is unclear still to what extent this can be attributed to climate change: climate models do not all show this feature.

== Background ==
A tropical cyclone is a rapidly rotating storm system characterized by a low-pressure center, a closed low-level atmospheric circulation, strong winds and a spiral arrangement of thunderstorms that produce heavy rain or squalls. The majority of these systems form each year in one of seven tropical cyclone basins, which are monitored by a variety of meteorological services and warning centres.

The factors that determine tropical cyclone activity are relatively well understood: warmer sea levels are favourable to tropical cyclones, as well as an unstable and moist mid-troposphere, while vertical wind shear suppresses them. All of these factors will change under climate change, but is not always clear which factor dominates.

Tropical cyclones are known as hurricanes in the Atlantic Ocean and the northeastern Pacific Ocean, typhoons in the northwestern Pacific Ocean, and cyclones in the southern Pacific or the Indian Ocean. Fundamentally, they are all the same type of storm.

== Data and models ==
=== Measurement ===
Heat from oceans contributes to the intensity of tropical cyclones, and there has been an increase in ocean heat content during recent decades as the oceans absorb over 90% of the heat from global warming.

Based on satellite imagery, the Dvorak technique is the primary technique used to estimate globally the tropical cyclone intensity.

The Potential Intensity (PI) of tropical cyclones can be computed from observed data, primarily derived from vertical profiles of temperature, humidity and sea surface temperatures (SSTs). The convective available potential energy (CAPE), was computed from radiosonde stations in parts of the tropics from 1958 to 1997, but is considered to be of poor quality. The Power Dissipation Index (PDI) represents the total power dissipation for the North Atlantic and western North Pacific, and is strongly correlated with tropical SSTs. Various tropical cyclone scales exist to classify a system.

=== Historical record ===
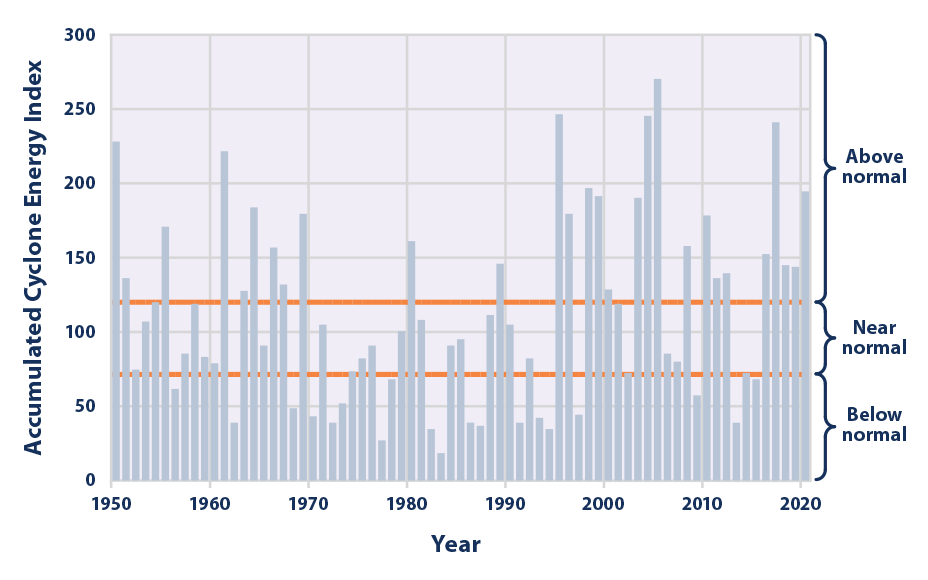
Tropical cyclone activity in the North Atlantic Ocean from 1950 to 2020 according to the Accumulated Cyclone Energy Index.

Since the satellite era, which began around 1970, trends are considered to be robust enough in regards to the connection of storms and sea surface temperatures. Agreement exists that there were active storm periods in the more distant past, but the sea surface temperature related Power Dissipation Index was not as high. Paleotempestology is the science of past tropical cyclone activity by means of geological proxies (flood sediment), or historical documentary records, such as shipwrecks or tree ring anomalies. As of 2019, paleoclimate studies are not yet sufficiently consistent to draw conclusions for wider regions, but they do provide some useful information about specific locations.

=== Modelling tropical cyclones ===
Climate models are used to study expected future changes in cyclonic activity. Lower-resolution climate models cannot represent convection directly, and instead use parametrizations to approximate the smaller scale processes. This poses difficulties for tropical cyclones, as convection is an essential part of tropical cyclone physics.

Higher-resolution global models and regional climate models may be more computer-intensive to run, making it difficult to simulate enough tropical cyclones for robust statistical analysis. However, with growing advancements in technology, climate models have improved simulation abilities for tropical cyclone frequency and intensity.

One challenge that scientists face when modeling is determining whether the recent changes in tropical cyclones are associated with anthropogenic forcing, or if these changes are still within their natural variability. This is most apparent when examining tropical cyclones at longer temporal resolutions. One study found a decreasing trend in tropical storms along the eastern Australian coast over a century-long historical record.

== Changes in tropical cyclones ==
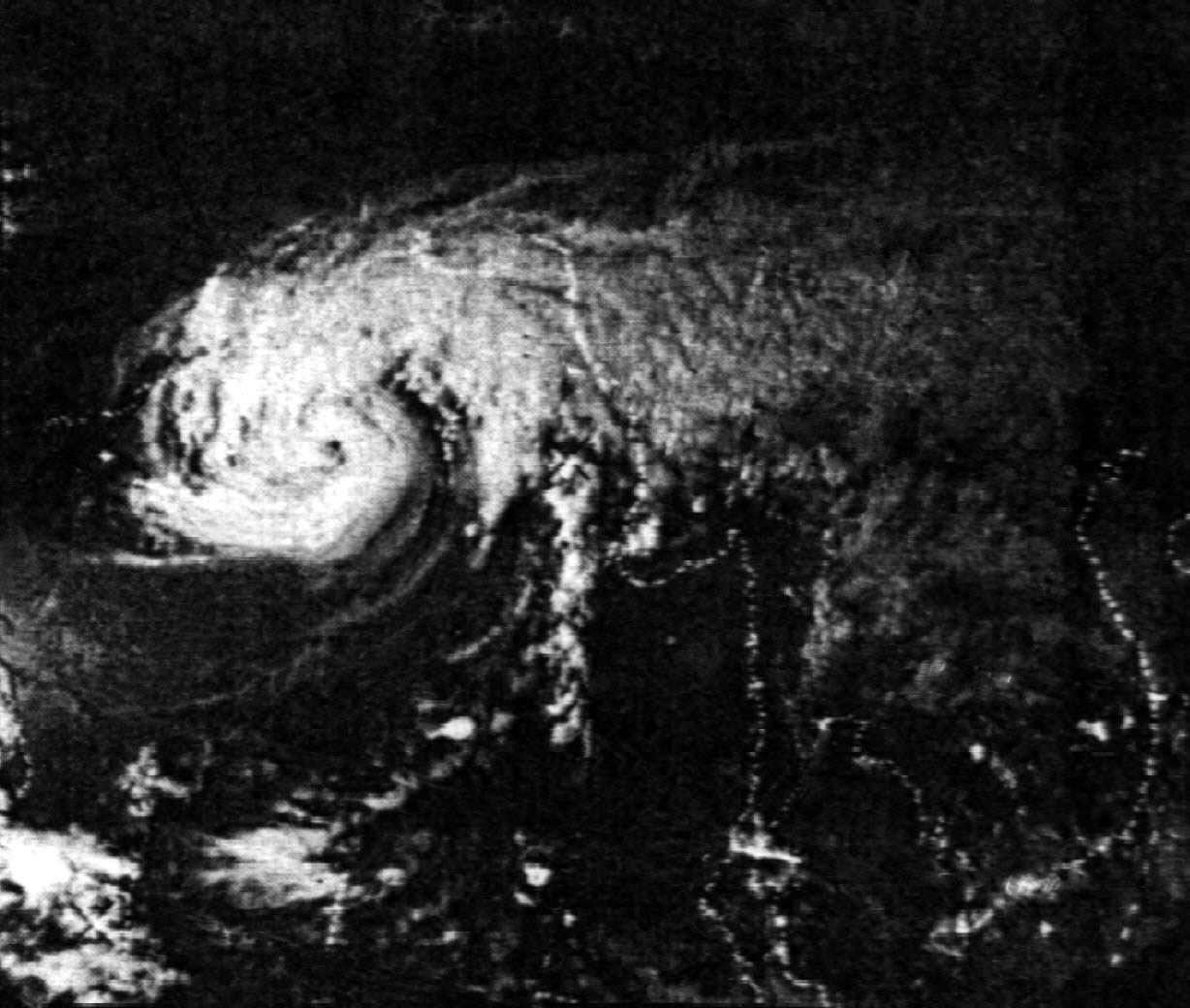
1970 Bhola cyclone before landfall. It became the deadliest tropical cyclone ever recorded with more than 300,000 casualties.

Climate change may affect tropical cyclones in a variety of ways: an intensification of rainfall and wind speed, a decrease in overall frequency, an increase in frequency of very intense storms and a poleward extension of where the cyclones reach maximum intensity are among the possible consequences of human-induced climate change.

=== Rainfall ===
Warmer air can hold more water vapor: the theoretical maximum water vapor content is given by the Clausius–Clapeyron relation, which yields ≈7% increase in water vapor in the atmosphere per 1 °C warming. All models that were assessed in a 2019 review paper show a future increase of rainfall rates, which is the rain that falls per hour. The World Meteorological Organization stated in 2017 that the quantity of rainfall from Hurricane Harvey had very likely been increased by climate change.

A tropical cyclone's rainfall area (in contrast to rate) is primarily controlled by its environmental sea surface temperature (SST) – relative to the tropical mean SST, called the relative sea surface temperature. Rainfall will expand outwards as the relative SST increases, associated with an expansion of a storm wind field. The largest tropical cyclones are observed in the western North Pacific tropics, where the largest values of relative SST and mid-tropospheric relative humidity are located. Assuming that ocean temperatures rise uniformly, a warming climate is not likely to impact rainfall area.

=== Intensity ===
Worldwide, the average annual number of Category 5 storms has doubled since 1982.

Category 5 hurricanes have become much more common in recent decades.

Applying the principles of extreme event attribution, it was found that climate change's increase of water temperatures intensified peak wind speeds in all eleven 2024 Atlantic hurricanes.

Wind damage varies exponentially with wind speed, so that small increases in wind strength can dramatically increase damage. Damages rise by about a factor of four for every category increase in the Saffir–Simpson scale.

Tropical cyclones use warm, moist air as their source of energy or "fuel". As climate change is warming ocean temperatures, there is potentially more of this fuel available. A study published in 2012 suggests that SSTs may be valuable as a proxy to measure potential intensity (PI) of tropical cyclones, as cyclones are sensitive to ocean basin temperatures. Between 1979 and 2017, there was a global increase in the proportion of tropical cyclones of Category 3 and higher on the Saffir–Simpson scale, which are cyclones with wind speeds over 178 km (111 mi) per hour. The trend was most clear in the North Atlantic and in the Southern Indian Ocean. In the North Pacific, tropical cyclones have been moving poleward into colder waters and there was no increase in intensity over this period. With 2 °C warming, a greater percentage (+13%) of tropical cyclones are expected to reach Category 4 and 5 strength. A study of 2020's storms of at least tropical storm-strength concluded that human-induced climate change increased extreme 3-hourly storm rainfall rates by 10%, and extreme 3-day accumulated rainfall amounts by 5%, and for hurricane-strength storms the figures increased to 11% and 8%.

Climate change has likely been driving the observed trend of rapid intensification of tropical cyclones in the Atlantic basin, with the proportion of storms undergoing intensification nearly doubling over the years 1982 to 2009. Rapidly intensifying cyclones are hard to forecast and pose additional risk to coastal communities. Storms have also begun to decay more slowly once they make landfall, threatening areas further inland than in the past. The 2020 Atlantic hurricane season was exceptionally active and broke numerous records for frequency and intensity of storms.

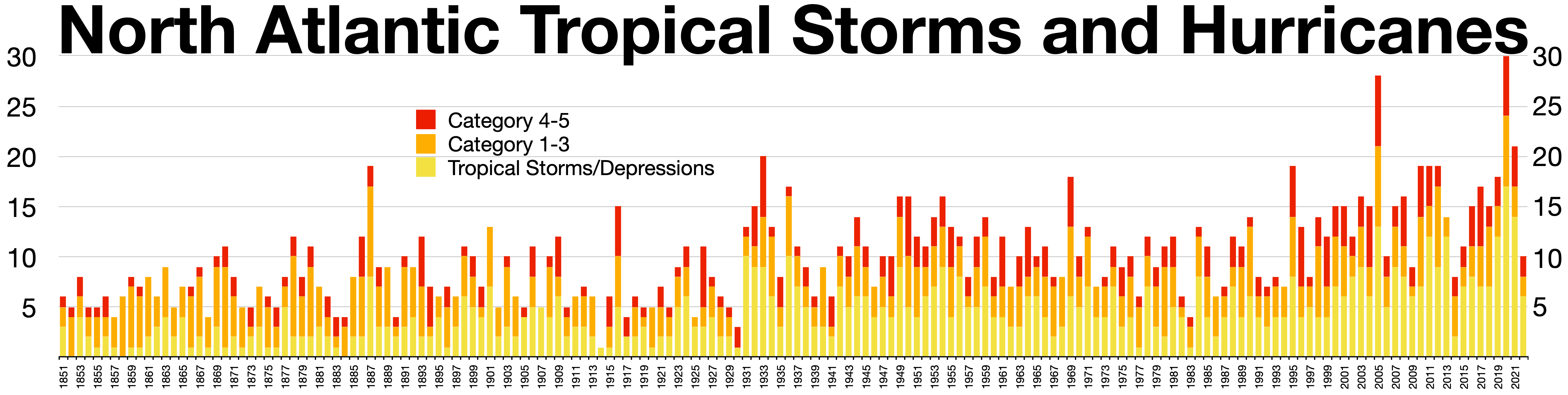
North Atlantic tropical storms and hurricanes Hurricane category 4–5 Hurricane category 1–3 Tropical storm or Tropical depression

=== Frequency ===
There is no consensus on how climate change will affect the overall frequency of tropical cyclones. A majority of climate models show a decreased frequency in future projections. For instance, a 2020 paper comparing nine high-resolution climate models found robust decreases in frequency in the Southern Indian Ocean and the Southern Hemisphere more generally, while finding mixed signals for Northern Hemisphere tropical cyclones. Observations have shown little change in the overall frequency of tropical cyclones worldwide.

A study published in 2015 concluded that there would be more tropical cyclones in a cooler climate, and that tropical cyclone genesis is possible with sea surface temperatures below 26 °C (79 °F). With warmer sea surface temperatures, especially in the Southern Hemisphere, in tandem with increased levels of carbon dioxide, it is likely tropical cyclone frequency will be reduced in the future.

Research conducted by Murakami et al. following the 2015 hurricane season in the eastern and central Pacific Ocean where a record number of tropical cyclones and three simultaneous category 4 hurricanes occurred, concludes that greenhouse gas forcing enhances subtropical Pacific warming which they project will increase the frequency of extremely active tropical cyclones in this area.

=== Storm tracks ===
There has been a poleward expansion of the latitude at which the maximum intensity of tropical cyclones occurs, which may be associated with climate change. In the North Pacific, there may also be an eastward expansion. Between 1949 and 2016, there was a slowdown in tropical cyclone translation speeds. It is unclear still to what extent this can be attributed to climate change: climate models do not all show this feature.

=== Storm surges and flood hazards ===
Additional sea level rise will increase storm surge levels. It is plausible that extreme wind waves see an increase as a consequence of changes in tropical cyclones, further exacerbating storm surge dangers to coastal communities. Between 1923 and 2008, storm surge incidents along the US Atlantic coast showed a positive trend. A 2017 study looked at compounding effects from floods, storm surge, and terrestrial flooding (rivers), and projects an increase due to climate change. However, scientists are still uncertain whether recent increases of storm surges are a response to anthropogenic climate change.

== Tropical cyclones in different basins ==
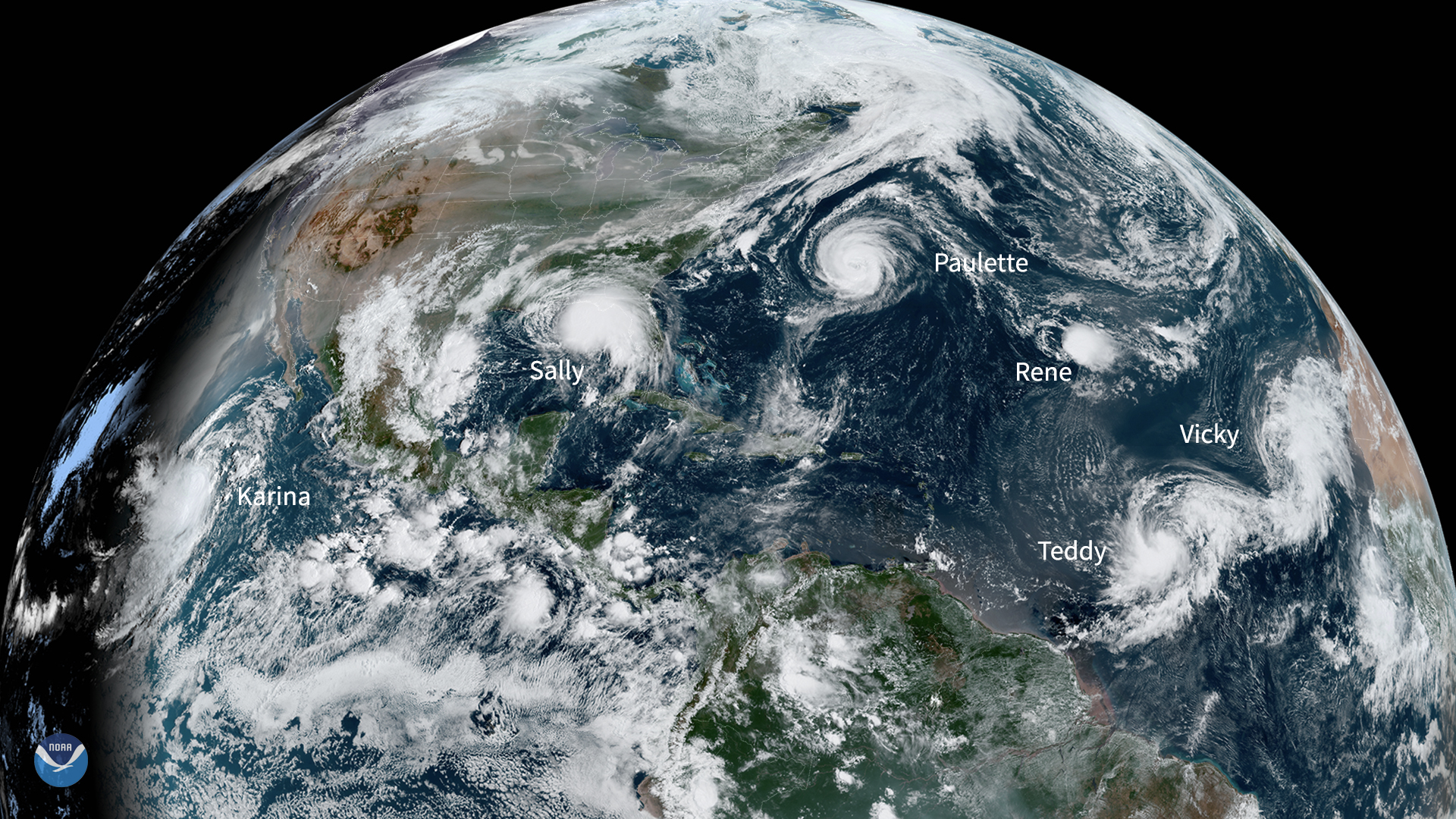
Six tropical cyclones swirl over two basins on September 16, 2020.

=== Hurricanes ===
Studies conducted in 2008 and 2016 looked at the duration of the Atlantic hurricane season, and found it may be getting longer, particular south of 30°N and east of 75°W, or the tendency toward more early- and late-season storms, correlated to warming sea surface temperatures. However, uncertainty is still high, and one study found no trend, another mixed results.

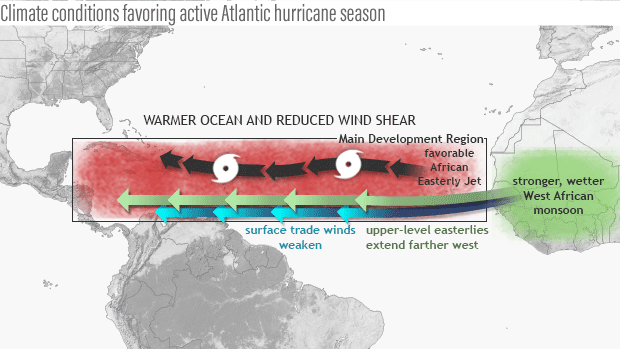
Map showing what seasonal climate patterns would be that would be associated with active Atlantic Hurricane Seasons

A 2011 study linked increased activity of intense hurricanes in the North Atlantic with a northward shift and amplification of convective activities from the African easterly waves (AEWs). In addition to cyclone intensity, both size and translation speed have been shown to be substantial contributors to the impacts resulting from hurricane passage. A 2014 study investigated the response of AEWs to high emissions scenarios, and found increases in regional temperature gradients, convergence and uplift along the Intertropical Front of Africa, resulting in strengthening of the African easterly waves, affecting the climate over West Africa and the larger Atlantic basin.

A 2017 study concluded that the 2015 highly active hurricane season could not be attributed solely to a strong El Niño event. Instead, subtropical warming was an important factor as well, a feature more common as a consequence of climate change. A 2019 study found that increasing evaporation and the larger capability of the atmosphere to hold water vapor linked to climate change, already increased the amount of rainfall from hurricanes Katrina, Irma and Maria by 4 to 9 percent. Future increases of up to 30% were projected.

A 2018 study found no significant trends in landfalling hurricane frequency nor intensity for the continental United States since 1900. Furthermore, growth in coastal populations and regional wealth served as the overwhelming drivers of observed increases in hurricane-related damage.

=== Typhoons ===
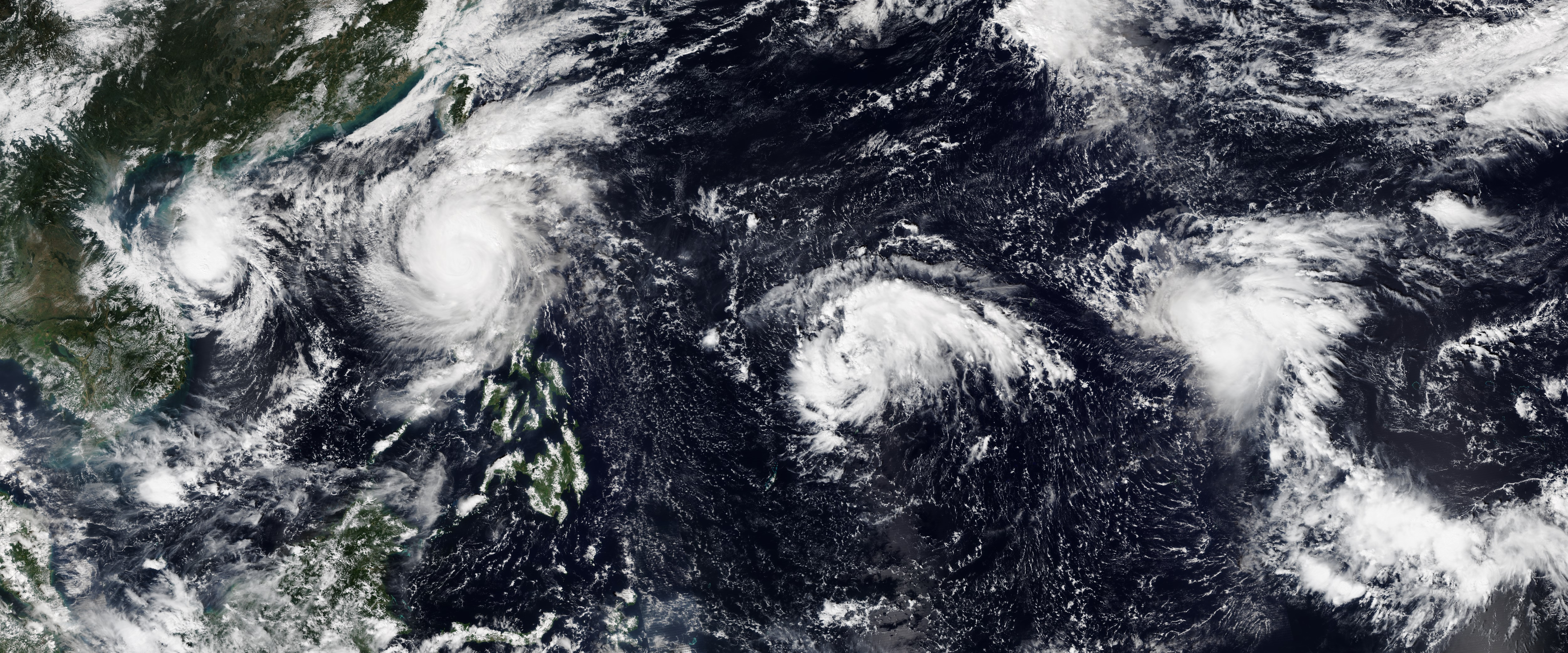
Four simultaneously active tropical cyclones on November 11, 2024. From left to right: Yinxing, Toraji, Usagi, and Man-yi, the first occurrence since 1951

Research based on records from Japan and Hawaii indicate that typhoons in the north-west Pacific intensified by 12–15% on average since 1977. The observed strongest typhoons doubled, or tripled in some regions, the intensity of particular landfalling systems is most pronounced. This uptick in storm intensity affects coastal populations in China, Japan, Korea and the Philippines, and has been attributed to warming ocean waters. According to a 2025 simulation study on typhoon impacts in Japan's Ise Bay, inundation probabilities are projected to doubled by the mid-21st century and could increase up to 20-fold by the late 21st century due to compounding sea-level rise. Furthermore, the worst-affected inundation areas are estimated to expand by 60% to 1360% by the year 2100.>The authors noted that it is not yet clear to what extent global warming caused the increased water temperatures, but observations are consistent with what the IPCC projects for warming of sea surface temperatures. Vertical wind shear has seen decreasing trends in and around China, creating more favourable conditions for intense tropical cyclones. This is mainly in response to the weakening of the East Asian summer monsoon, a consequence of global warming.

== Risk management and adaptation ==
There are several risks associated with the increase of tropical storms, such as it can directly or indirectly cause injuries or death. The most effective strategy to manage risks has been the development of early warning systems. A further policy that would mitigate risks of flooding is reforestation of inland areas in order to strengthen the soil of the communities and reduce coastal inundation. It is also recommended that local schools, churches, and other community infrastructure be permanently equipped to become cyclone shelters. Focusing on applying resources towards immediate relief to those affected may divert attention from more long-term solutions. This is further exacerbated in lower-income communities and countries as they suffer most from the consequences of tropical cyclones.

=== Pacific region ===
Specific national and supranational decisions have already been made and are being implemented. The Framework for Resilient Development in the Pacific (FRDP) has been instituted to strengthen and better coordinate disaster response and climate change adaptation among nations and communities in the region. Specific nations such as Tonga and the Cook Islands in the Southern Pacific under this regime have developed a Joint National Action Plan on Climate Change and Disaster Risk Management (JNAP) to coordinate and execute responses to the rising risk for climate change. These countries have identified the most vulnerable areas of their nations, generated national and supranational policies to be implemented, and provided specific goals and timelines to achieve these goals. These actions to be implemented include reforestation, building of levees and dams, creation of early warning systems, reinforcing existing communication infrastructure, finding new sources of fresh water, promoting and subsidizing the proliferation renewable energy, improving irrigation techniques to promote sustainable agriculture, increase public education efforts on sustainable measures, and lobbying internationally for the increased use of renewable energy sources.

=== United States ===
The number of $1 billion Atlantic hurricanes almost doubled from the 1980s to the 2010s, and inflation-adjusted costs have increased more than elevenfold. The increases have been attributed to climate change and to greater numbers of people moving to coastal areas.

In the United States, there have been several initiatives taken to better prepare for the strengthening of hurricanes, such as preparing local emergency shelters, building sand dunes and levees, and reforestation initiatives. Despite better modeling capabilities of hurricanes, property damage has increased dramatically. The National Flood Insurance Program incentivizes people to re-build houses in flood-prone areas, and thereby hampers adaptation to increased risk from hurricanes and sea level rise. Due to the wind shear and storm surge, a building with a weak building envelope is subject to more damages. Risk assessment using climate models help determine the structural integrity of residential buildings in hurricane-prone areas.

Some ecosystems, such as marshes, mangroves, and coral reefs, can serve as a natural obstacle to coastal erosion, storm surges, and wind damage caused by hurricanes. These natural habitats are seen to be more cost-effective as they serve as a carbon sink and support biodiversity of a region. Although there is substantial evidence of natural habitats being the more beneficial barrier for tropical cyclones, built defenses are often the primary solution for government agencies and decision makers. A study published in 2015, which assessed the feasibility of natural, engineered, and hybrid risk-mitigation to tropical cyclones in Freeport, Texas, found that incorporating natural ecosystems into risk-mitigation plans could reduce flood heights and ease the cost of built defenses in the future.

== Media and public perception ==
The destruction from early 21st century Atlantic Ocean hurricanes, such as Hurricanes Katrina, Wilma, and Sandy, caused a substantial upsurge in interest in the subject of climate change and hurricanes by news media and the wider public, and concerns that global climatic change may have played a significant role in those events. In 2005 and 2017, related polling of populations affected by hurricanes concluded in 2005 that 39 percent of Americans believed climate change helped to fuel the intensity of hurricanes, rising to 55 percent in September 2017.

After Typhoon Meranti in 2016, risk perception in China was not measured to increase. However, there was a clear rise in support for personal and community action against climate change. In Taiwan, people that had lived through a typhoon did not express more anxiety about climate change. The survey did find a positive correlation between anxiety about typhoons and anxiety about climate change.

== See also ==
- Atlantic hurricane reanalysis project
- Effects of global warming on oceans
- Effects of tropical cyclones
- List of Category 5 Atlantic hurricanes
- List of Category 5 Pacific hurricanes
- List of the most intense tropical cyclones
