= Tropical Storm Trami =

Pacific severe tropical storm in 2024

Severe Tropical Storm Trami (Kristine)
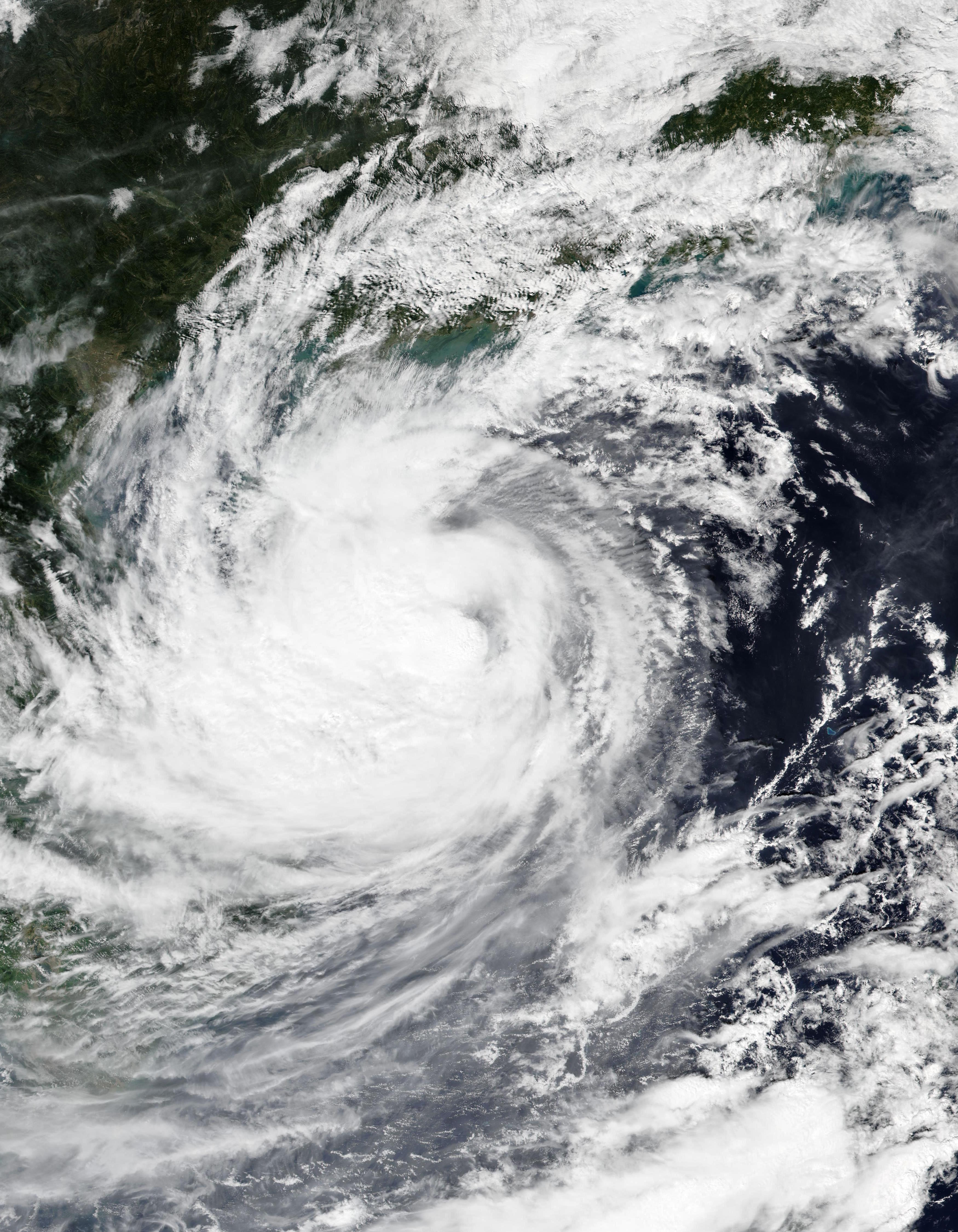
- Trami at its initial peak intensity off the coast of Vietnam on October 26

Meteorological history
- Formed: October 18, 2024
- Dissipated: October 29, 2024

Severe tropical storm
- 10-minute sustained (JMA)
- Highest winds: 110 km/h (70 mph)
- Lowest pressure: 970 hPa (mbar); 28.64 inHg

Category 1-equivalent typhoon
- 1-minute sustained (SSHWS/JTWC)
- Highest winds: 120 km/h (75 mph)
- Lowest pressure: 984 hPa (mbar); 29.06 inHg

Overall effects
- Fatalities: 179
- Injuries: 151
- Missing: 23
- Damage: $405 million (2024 USD)
- Areas affected: Philippines (particularly Luzon); Vietnam; Thailand; China
- IBTrACS
- Part of the 2024 Pacific typhoon season

Severe Tropical Storm Trami, (Note: The name Trami (Vietnamese: trà mi, [t͡ɕaː˨˩ mi˧˧]) was contributed by Vietnam and means camellia in Vietnamese.) known in the Philippines as Severe Tropical Storm Kristine, was a large, slow-moving, and devastating tropical cyclone that caused widespread and disastrous flooding and numerous fatalities across the Philippines and later impacted Vietnam, Thailand, and China in late October 2024. It was also the first tropical cyclone in a consecutive series to impact the Philippines in late 2024, before Typhoons Kong-rey, Yinxing, Toraji, Usagi, and Man-yi. The twentieth named storm of the annual typhoon season, Trami developed into a low-pressure area and later into a tropical depression west of Guam on October 19, moving westward along the southern periphery.

After entering the Philippine Area of Responsibility, PAGASA named the depression Kristine on October 20. Early the next day, the Japan Meteorological Agency (JMA) upgraded the system to a tropical storm, naming it Trami, as spiral bands of deep convection formed around the low-level circulation. By October 23, Trami intensified into a severe tropical storm as it moved west-northwestward and made landfall in Divilacan, Isabela. On October 26, the Joint Typhoon Warning Center (JTWC) reported that the system had peaked as a Category 1-equivalent typhoon after Trami attained 1-minute sustained winds of 120 km/h (75 mph), while the JMA indicated that Trami reached its peak intensity with 10-minute sustained winds of 110 km/h (70 mph) and a central pressure of 970 hPa (28.64 inHg). The storm made landfall the next day in Thua Thien-Hue and Da Nang and moved near the Laos–Vietnam border, where its circulation center became fully exposed before making a U-turn and gradually shifted back toward the coastal regions of Vietnam. The JMA continued to monitor the system, which further weakened into a low-pressure area at 18:00 UTC on October 29.

PAGASA forecast that the wind flow directed towards the storm would bring strong to gale-force winds to several regions in the Philippines, prompting the issuance of Tropical Cyclone Wind Signals for various areas. A red alert warning was issued for the Bicol Region, the Cordillera Administrative Region, and the Ilocos Region, while officials from Batanes and Ilocos Norte had expressed concerns about potential further damage to their provinces, as they were still recovering from Typhoon Krathon earlier in the year. In Daet, Camarines Norte, PAGASA recorded 528.5 mm (20.81 in) of rain from Trami, marking the highest 24-hour rainfall since the 1920s and surpassing the previous record of 507.5 mm (19.98 in) set in December 2000. Coastal areas of Hainan Province in South China issued a red alert, the highest warning level, due to the approaching storm, forcing over 40,000 people to evacuate. Strong winds in Da Nang, toppled trees and billboards, while heavy rainfall in Quang Tri province caused severe flooding, leaving 18,000 people without power. In Thailand, flooding was reported in Bang Sai District, Phra Nakhon Si Ayutthaya province. Overall, Trami was responsible for 179 deaths, with 23 people reported missing and 151 others injured, causing approximately US$405 million in damages. Owing to the damages and deaths, PAGASA retired the name Kristine after the season and was replaced with Kidul for the 2028 season. In February 2025, the name Trami was also retired by the ESCAP/WMO Typhoon Committee and was replaced with Hoaban in 2026.

== Meteorological history ==
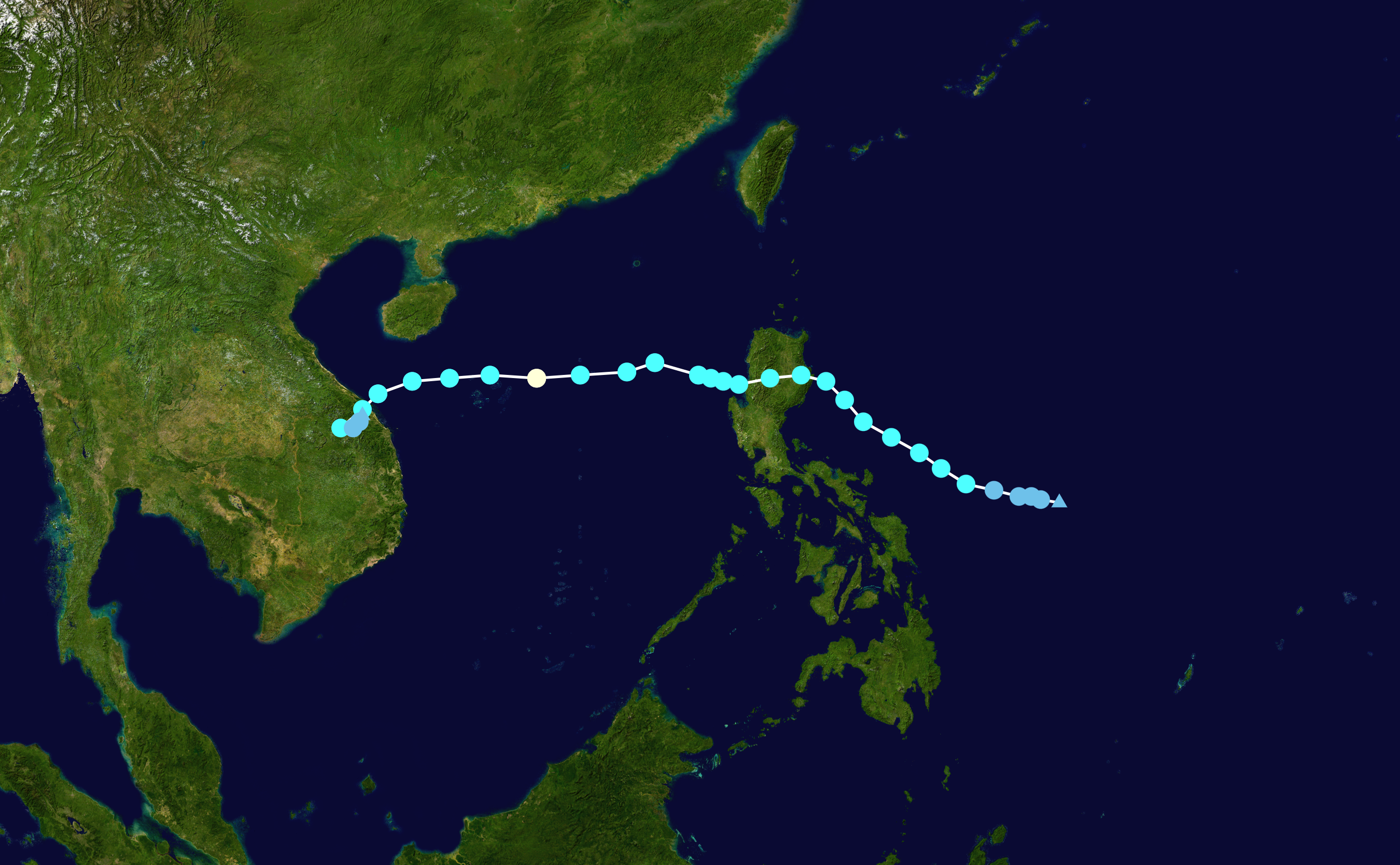
Map plotting the storm's track and intensity, according to the Saffir–Simpson scale Map key Saffir–Simpson scale Tropical depression (≤38 mph, ≤62 km/h) Tropical storm (39–73 mph, 63–118 km/h) Category 1 (74–95 mph, 119–153 km/h) Category 2 (96–110 mph, 154–177 km/h) Category 3 (111–129 mph, 178–208 km/h) Category 4 (130–156 mph, 209–251 km/h) Category 5 (≥157 mph, ≥252 km/h) Unknown Storm type Tropical cyclone Subtropical cyclone Extratropical cyclone, remnant low, tropical disturbance, or monsoon depression

The origins of Severe Tropical Storm Trami could be traced back to October 19, when the Japan Meteorological Agency (JMA) reported a low-pressure area located 633 km (394 mi) west of Guam. The United States Joint Typhoon Warning Center (JTWC) described it as a very weak vortex with light winds wrapping around the circulation, along with deep moisture fields to the southwest that began to encircle the vortex. The low-pressure area later moved westward slowly before it was designated as a tropical depression by the JMA. At 15:00 UTC that day, the JTWC issued a tropical cyclone formation alert, indicating a consolidating low-level circulation center bounded by formative convective banding that wrapped around its northern and southern edges. The depression moved westward along the southern periphery of a mid-level subtropical high, which made conditions favorable for tropical cyclogenesis due to low vertical wind shear, warm sea surface temperatures, and high ocean heat content. The following day, the JTWC designated the system as 22W, as low-level banding wrapped into the circulation center, with a tightly curved convective band wrapping along the eastern edge of the circulation. After entering the Philippine Area of Responsibility, the depression was named Kristine by the PAGASA at 05:00 PHT on October 21 (21:00 UTC on October 20) and was embedded within the larger trough that extended from the Philippines eastward almost to Guam.

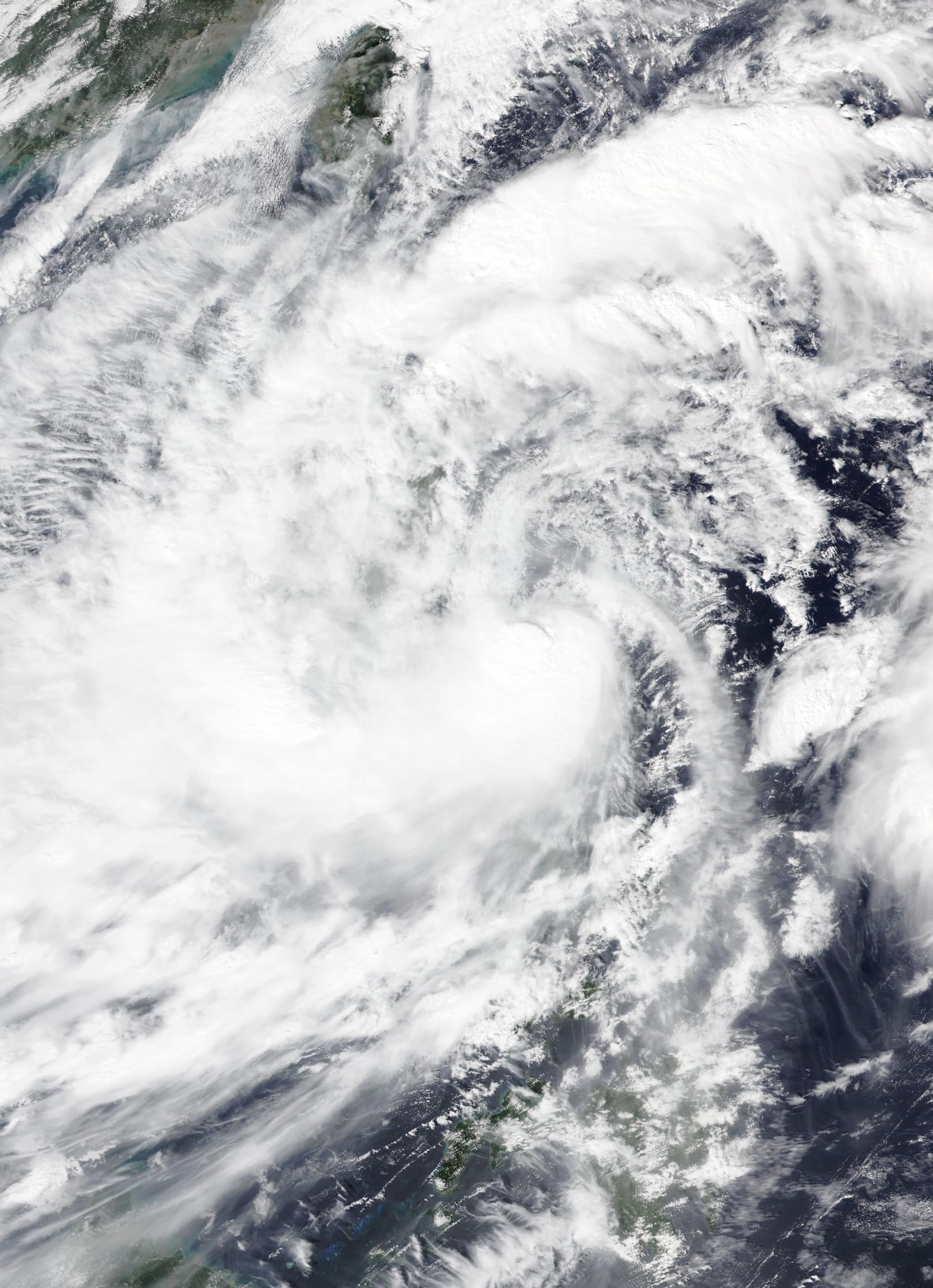
Trami impacting the Philippines on October 22

Early the next day, satellite imagery revealed that the depression had become exposed, featuring elongated circulation and convective bands wrapping around the center. At 18:00 UTC that day, the JMA upgraded the system to a tropical storm and named it Trami, with spiral bands of deep convection starting to wrap around the low-level circulation. Trami moved westward along the southern edge of a mid-level subtropical high, developing spiral bands of deep convection that wrapped around a partly exposed low-level circulation center just east of Luzon Island, while its deep convective banding was displaced over the southwestern quadrant due to northeasterly vertical wind shear. As Trami approached Luzon, its central dense overcast (CDO) became sheared and displaced from its central circulation, featuring moderate upper-level outflow and a partially exposed circulation center located to the northeast of the primary broad central convection. At around 06:00 UTC on October 23, the JMA reported that Trami had intensified into a severe tropical storm as it moved west-northwestward along the southwestern edge of a mid-level subtropical high, with deep convection developing in the southwestern quadrant of a broad, partially exposed low-level circulation. At 12:30 AM PHT on October 24 (16:30 UTC on October 23), the storm made landfall in Divilacan, Isabela, where it exhibited a circular CDO characterized by fragmented convection as it moved across central Luzon. The following day, Trami emerged over the coastal waters of southern Ilocos Sur. Surface observations and radar data revealed that the storm had undergone a lee-side jump, leaving behind the remnants of a circulation center over Northern Luzon. Meanwhile, the mid-level rotation shifted slowly westward into the eastern South China Sea. Later, satellite imagery showed a consolidating CDO, indicating a well-defined circulation with most of the deep convection situated to the south. As it moved westward along the southern periphery, satellite imagery indicated an asymmetric system, featuring minimal significant convection in the northern circulation, while the southern circulation displayed a convective mass with cloud tops colder than −91 °C (−132 °F). On October 26, the JTWC reported that the system had peaked as a Category 1-equivalent typhoon after Trami attained 1-minute sustained winds of 120 km/h (75 mph), while the JMA indicated that Trami reached its peak intensity with 10-minute sustained winds of 110 km/h (70 mph) and a central pressure of 970 hPa (28.64 inHg). Operationally, the JTWC classified Trami as a tropical storm with winds of 110 km/h (70 mph), but a post-cyclone reanalysis later determined that it had reached a peak wind speed of 120 km/h (75 mph).

Trami encountered strong easterly vertical wind shear as it approached the coast of Vietnam, which caused its core convection to become more linear. It made landfall in Thua Thien-Hue and Da Nang at about 10:00 a.m. local time on October 27, before drifting slowly inland while moving southwestward over the next several hours. The storm rapidly weakened as it moved around the Laos–Vietnam border, causing the circulation center to become fully exposed as it weakened into a tropical depression. It then moved southwestward due to weak steering flow before making a U-turn and gradually moving toward the coastal regions of Vietnam.

At 21:00 UTC on October 28, the JTWC discontinued warnings on the system as its mid-level rotation winds were displaced from the center. The JMA continued to monitor the system, which further weakened into a low-pressure area at 18:00 UTC the following day.

== Preparations ==
=== Philippines ===
==== Highest Tropical Cyclone Wind Signal ====
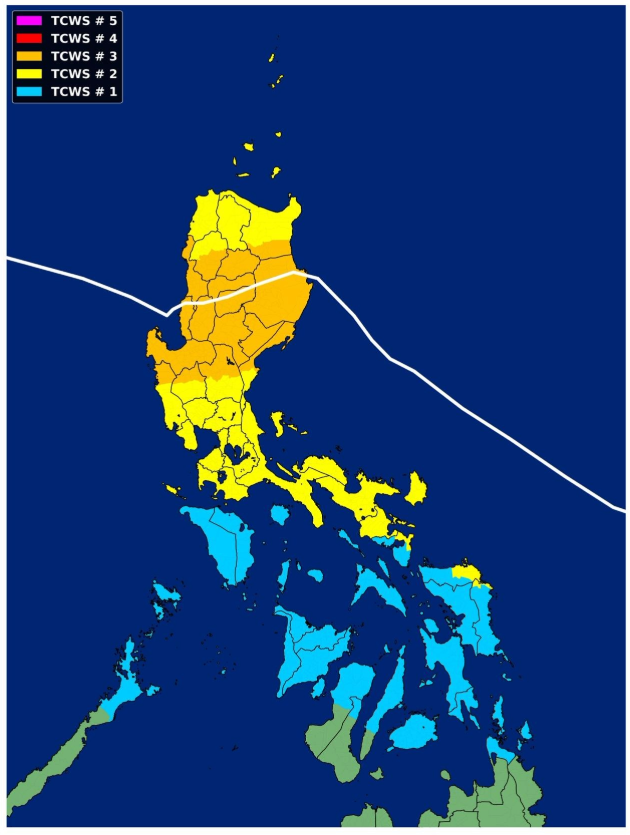
Highest Tropical Cyclone Wind Signal issued by PAGASA for Trami (Kristine) in each province. The white line represents the best track.

TCWS#	Luzon	Visayas	Mindanao
3	Ilocos Sur, La Union, Pangasinan, Isabela, Nueva Vizcaya, Quirino, Southern Portion of Cagayan, Northern and Central Portions of Aurora, Northern Portion of Nueva Ecija, Northern Portion of Tarlac, Northern Portion of Zambales, Benguet, Ifugao, Kalinga, Mountain Province, Southern Portion of Abra	None	None
2	Ilocos Norte, Rest of Cagayan, Bataan, Bulacan, Pampanga, Rest of Aurora, Rest of Nueva Ecija, Rest of Tarlac, Rest of Zambales, Apayao, Babuyan Islands, Batanes, Rest of Abra, Metro Manila, Batangas, Cavite, Laguna, Rizal, Quezon, Lubang Islands, Polillo Island, Albay, Camarines Norte, Camarines Sur, Catanduanes, Northern Portion of Sorsogon	Northeastern Portion of Northern Samar, Northern Portion of Eastern Samar	None
1	Calamian Islands, Cuyo Islands, Marinduque, Northern Portion of Palawan, Occidental Mindoro, Oriental Mindoro, Romblon, Burias Island, Masbate, Rest of Sorsogon, Ticao Island	Aklan, Antique, Capiz, Guimaras, Iloilo, Bantayan Islands, Bohol, Caluya Islands, Northern and Central Portions of Cebu, Northern Portion of Negros Occidental, Northern Portion of Negros Oriental, Biliran, Leyte, Rest of Eastern Samar, Rest of Northern Samar, Samar, Southern Leyte	Bucas Grande Island, Dinagat Islands, Surigao del Sur

PAGASA stated that the wind flow directed towards the circulation of the storm brought strong to gale-force winds to several regions in the Philippines. Shortly after upgrading the storm, PAGASA issued Tropical Cyclone Wind Signal No. 1 for various areas, including Biliran, Batanes, Burias Island, Dinagat Islands, Eastern Samar, Leyte, Masbate, Occidental Mindoro, Oriental Mindoro, Romblon, Sorsogon, Samar, Southern Leyte, Siargao, Surigao del Norte (including Bucas Grande Islands), and Ticao Island. After Trami developed into a tropical storm, PAGASA raised Signal No. 2 for Abra, Albay, Apayao, Babuyan Islands, Bataan, Batangas, Bulacan, Camarines Norte, Camarines Sur, Catanduanes, Cavite, Ilocos Norte, Laguna, Metro Manila, Pampanga, Quezon (including Polillo Islands and Lubang Islands), Rizal, the northern portion of Eastern Samar, as well as the northeastern portion of Northern Samar and Sorsogon.

On October 23, the agency added the whole province of Aklan, Antique (including Caluya Islands), Bohol, Capiz, Cebu (including Bantayan Islands and Camotes Islands), Guimaras, and Iloilo, as well as the northern portion of Negros Occidental; Negros Oriental; and Palawan (including Calamian Islands, Cuyo Islands, and Kalayaan Islands) due to the effects of Trami. After the storm reached the severe tropical storm category, the agency raised Signal No. 3, indicating an expectation of winds of 89–117 km/h (55–73 mph) within the next 18 hours for Benguet, Ifugao, Isabela, Kalinga, La Union, Mountain Province, Nueva Vizcaya, Pangasinan, Quirino, the central portion of Abra, the northern and central portions of Aurora, the northern portion of Nueva Ecija, Tarlac, and Zambales, the southern portion of Cagayan, and the central and southern portions of Ilocos Sur.

PAGASA issued storm surge warnings for portions of Albay, Aurora, Cagayan, Camarines Norte, Catanduanes, Isabela, Quezon, and Camarines Sur.

Tropical Storm Trami approaching the Philippines on October 21

A red alert warning was issued for the Bicol Region, the Cordillera Administrative Region, and the Ilocos Region. The NDRRMC reported that 168,039 people were preemptively evacuated. The Regional Disaster Risk Reduction and Management Council activated all response clusters, urging communities to take necessary precautions in preparation for Trami.

Orange rainfall warnings were issued for Eastern Samar, Samar, Biliran, the northern portion of Leyte, and northern Cebu, with PAGASA cautioning that flooding could occur in low-lying areas.

The Office of Civil Defense anticipated that the storm would affect approximately 30 million individuals across different regions and announced that it had initiated the Charlie protocol—its highest level of emergency readiness—in seven areas due to the anticipated effects.

The Philippine Institute of Volcanology and Seismology also raised lahar advisories for Mayon Volcano. Officials from Batanes and Ilocos Norte expressed concern about the potential for further damage to their provinces due to the storm’s expected impact, especially since these areas were still recovering from Typhoon Krathon (Julian) in 2024. The Magat, Ipo, San Roque, Ambuklao, and Binga Dams opened spillways as a precaution. The Department of Agriculture urged farmers to harvest their rice before the storm.

The Philippine Coast Guard (PCG) banned sea travel in the three provinces of Samar island, with the greatest loss travel going to island communities. Regional offices in Bicol also prepared family food packs in the wake of the storm. The PCG stated that 8,786 people were stranded in ports across the country, including 162 people in Southern Tagalog, 2,450 in Bicol, 2,109 in Eastern Visayas, and 490 in Central Visayas.

In Sorsogon, the Kasanggayahan Festival was canceled, while the National Collegiate Athletic Association and the University Athletic Association of the Philippines postponed sports competitions scheduled on October 23–25. Several airports across the country were disrupted, while at least 51 flight cancellations were reported, stranding more than 1,000 passengers. Schools and non-essential government offices in Luzon were suspended on October 23–25. Multiple trips originating from the Parañaque Integrated Terminal Exchange were cancelled following the storm.

The Metropolitan Manila Development Authority suspended number coding in Metro Manila on October 23–25. The Professional Regulation Commission postponed the Certified Public Accountants Licensure Exam due to the storm's impact on both testing centers and examinees.

=== Elsewhere ===
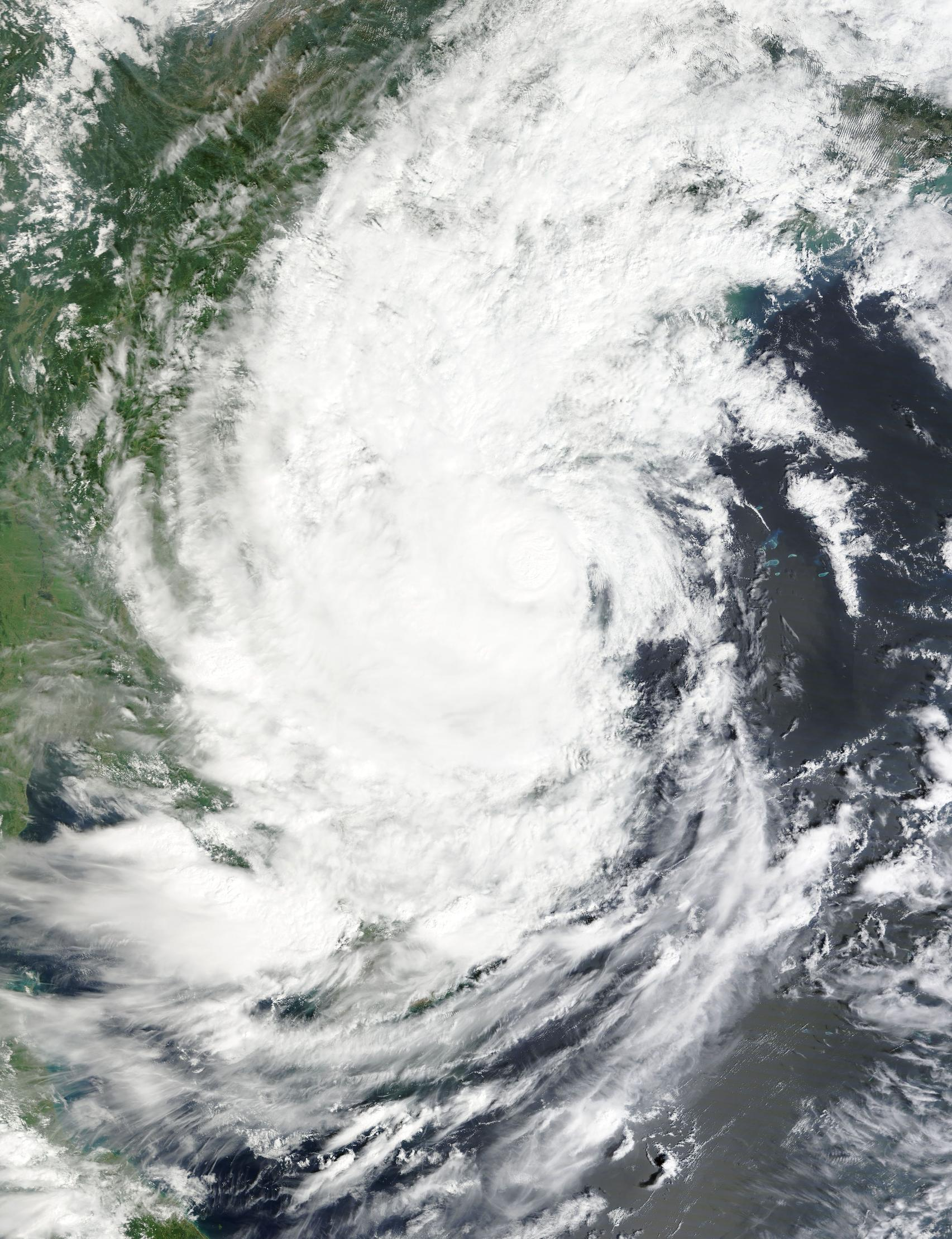
Trami approaching landfall in Vietnam on October 27

Trami was expected to be the sixth typhoon to strike Vietnam according to the National Center for Hydro-Meteorological Forecasting. Deputy Prime Minister Trần Hồng Hà urged relevant government agencies to prepare for Trami's impact. A total of 285,480 soldiers and militia personnel, along with 12,503 military vehicles, were deployed in response to the impending storm. The Civil Aviation Authority of Vietnam reported that four airports in central coast Vietnam, from north to south, included Đồng Hới, Phú Bài, Đà Nẵng, Chu Lai, would suspend operations, while authorities in Quảng Bình announced a ban on all coastal activities starting at midnight on October 27. Quang Nam province has evacuated 4,412 households, totaling 18,306 individuals across 10 localities, while Da Nang has relocated more than 6,200 residents from boarding houses and temporary accommodations to safer areas. The coastal areas of Hainan Province in South China issued a red alert, the highest warning level, due to an approaching storm, which forced over 40,000 people to evacuate.

The leader of the Nam Trà My district announced that the locality prepared an evacuation plan for 1,341 households, totaling 5,832 residents, due to the risk of landslides from heavy rains associated with the storm. The Thai Meteorological Department cautioned that Trami would bring heavy rainfall and strong winds to Thailand. On October 23, the Central Weather Administration issued heavy rain warnings for the Greater Taipei and Yilan–Hualien areas despite Trami not expecting to directly affect Taiwan. The Hong Kong Observatory (HKO) issued a signal number 1 warning for the city on October 25 at 1:40 AM. At 10:40 AM on October 26, the HKO issued a signal number 3 warning, and the following day, at 12:20 AM, they announced the cancellation of all tropical cyclone signals.

== Impact ==
Casualties by country
Country	Deaths	Injuries	Missing	Damage
Philippines	162 (Note: These are casualties that have been reported but are not yet included in the NDRRMC Situation Report.)	137	22	$317 million
China	7	Unknown	1	$32.3 million
Vietnam	9	14	Unknown	$55.3 million
Thailand	1	Unknown	Unknown	Unknown
Total	179	151	23	$405 million

=== Philippines ===
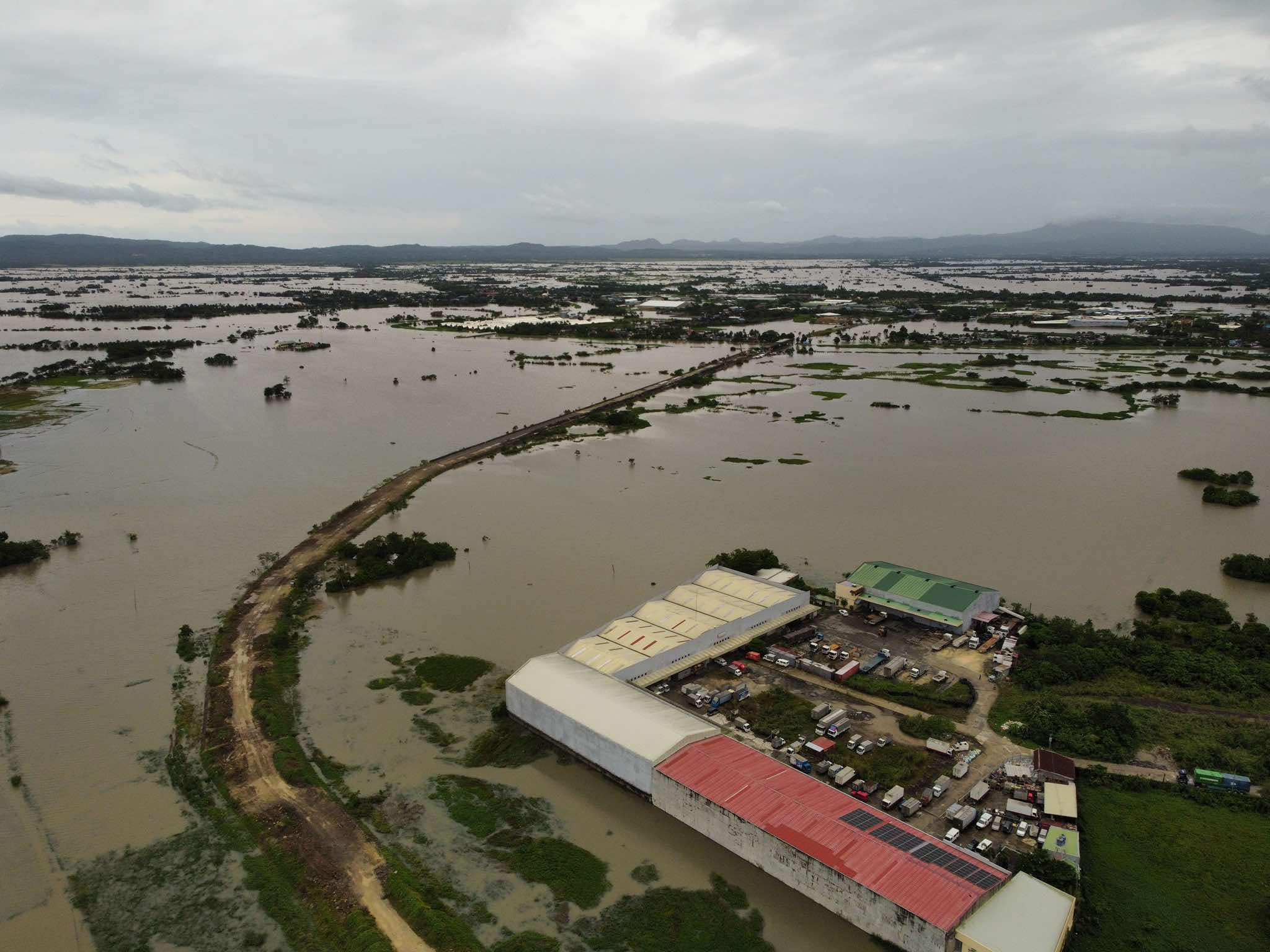
An aerial view of the flooded rice fields in Naga, Camarines Sur after Trami devastated the country.

Despite passing over Northern Luzon, the combination of Trami and the enhanced southwest monsoon caused the heaviest rain to fall in areas farther south of the storm. This ultimately brought massive, devastating flooding to the Bicol Region and Calabarzon, where daily precipitation totals exceeded 300 mm (12 in) between October 22 to October 24.

As a result, landslides were reported in Bato, Catanduanes, and heavy flooding also ensued in Albay, where 413 mm (16.3 in) of rain fell within 17 hours, the highest since Typhoon Durian (Reming) in 2006, and the equivalent of two months of average precipitation. In Daet, Camarines Norte, PAGASA recorded the highest 24-hour rainfall since the 1920s, with Trami dumping 528.5 mm (20.81 in) of rain and surpassing the previous record of 507.5 mm (19.98 in) set in December 2000. Officials in Naga said that around 700 mm (28 in) of rain fell on the city, equivalent to 2.5 months of average precipitation, causing floods from the Bicol River basin that affected 30% of its territory and 70% of its population. Trami brought torrential rainfall over a 24-hour period, leading to what could be considered the worst flooding in the Bicol Region since 1969. Heavy rains were reported in the Visayas, Mindanao, and parts of Luzon due to the storm's trough. In Bacolod, over 281 residents from two barangays were evacuated due to flash floods triggered by heavy rains from the storm, while 316 families were evacuated in Negros Occidental. Trami also caused flooding in Sorsogon, Catanduanes, and Northern Samar. Heavy rains from Trami have caused flash floods in several regions within the provinces of Maguindanao del Sur, Maguindanao del Norte, and Sultan Kudarat. Nearly all of Naga, Camarines Sur was submerged in floodwaters reaching up to 1.8 m (6 ft), leading to forced evacuations after the Naga River reached critical level. A storm surge inundated six barangays in Lingayen, Pangasinan. Trami caused Batangas province to experience precipitation equivalent to "two months' worth of rain," totaling 391.3 mm (15.41 in), on October 24–25. At least 6,034 people were evacuated in the province, while the Batangas Provincial Hospital in Lemery halted patient admissions after floodwaters entered its wards and emergency room, and a landslide occurred in Talisay, resulting in 20 fatalities. Water levels in towns along Taal Lake increased by 3 ft 3 in (1 m), while parts of Bulacan were submerged in up to 4 ft 11 in (1.5 m) of water.

Tropical Storm Trami's casualties in the Philippines
Region	Deaths	Ref.
Calabarzon	74
Bicol Region	66
Central Visayas	5
Zamboanga Peninsula	4
Eastern Visayas	3
Cordillera Region	3
Central Luzon	2
Northern Mindanao	1
Cagayan Valley	1
Total	159

A phenomenon known as a lee-side jump caused the circulation center to shift abruptly to the west, and Trami emerged over the South China Sea on October 24.

Trami affecting the province of Eastern Samar

A person was reported missing after their banca broke down in the waters near Merida, Leyte, while his two companions were rescued in Pilar, Cebu. Another person died in the sinking of a banca in Obando, Bulacan, while nine others were rescued. A portion of the Maharlika Highway linking the Southern Tagalog and Bicol Regions was blocked by floods in Lopez, Quezon. Landslides blocked roads in San Mariano, Isabela and Calanasan, Apayao, while strong winds were experienced in Laoag, Ilocos Norte, and heavy rainfall and flooding were reported in Pili, Camarines Sur. Several power lines in Luzon and the Visayas were disconnected, as determined by the National Grid Corporation of the Philippines. In Dolores, Eastern Samar, strong winds nearly toppled several trees, and schools in Jipapad were flooded. In Guinobatan, Albay, some roads in the area were impassable due to a lahar flow from Mayon Volcano. At least three villages were partially covered by lahar from Mayon Volcano after heavy rainfall from Trami. Fifty houses were destroyed by strong waves in Sibuco, Zamboanga del Norte, while several cottages were also destroyed along the coast of San Juan, La Union. In Surigao City, ten houses were destroyed along with hundreds of cottages by waves with a height of up to 3.0 m (10 ft). Two Bicol University campuses sustained major damage to fields, windows, and other important parts, while Naga Cathedral was submerged in floodwaters reaching waist levels. Multiple places across Bicol sustained chest-high flood waters, with multiple calls for help. In Bula, Camarines Sur, trapped residents accused private rescuers of charging fees of up to ₱5,000 (US$101.52) before they could be evacuated by boat. Globe Telecom reported outages affecting 75% to 92% of customers in Catanduanes, Camarines Sur, Albay, and Camarines Norte.

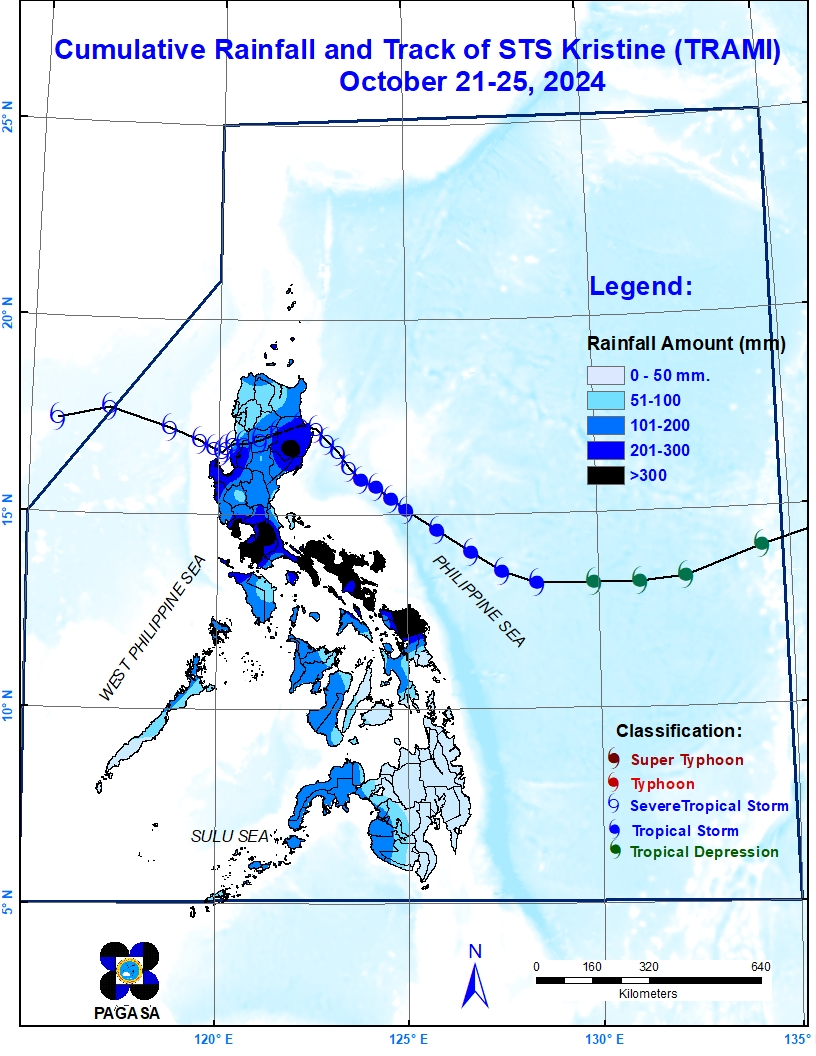
Cumulative Rainfall from Severe Tropical Storm Trami

In Quezon, floods reached a depth of 3.0 m (10 ft). A total of 101,148 people were displaced in Camarines Sur alone, while 17,000 were displaced in Albay and 11,000 in Quezon. Sixty people were evacuated in Palanan, while 316 were evacuated from the coast near Divilacan. More than 3,800 people were evacuated in Cagayan, while 1,438 were evacuated in Ilagan. A landslide partially blocked a section of the Nueva Vizcaya-Benguet road in Kayapa. In Tuguegarao, around 3,230 ha (8,000 acres) of crops were destroyed. Around 1,104 people were evacuated in Rizal. At least seven houses on Apo Island in Dauin, Negros Oriental, were destroyed by strong winds and massive waves. 84 houses in Catanduanes, Masbate and Camarines Norte were destroyed while 857 others were damaged. At least four houses in Sagay, Camiguin and three others in Cagayan de Oro were also destroyed. Some areas in Metro Manila experienced flooding as a result of the storm, resulting in the evacuation of 588 people in Malabon and five families in Marikina. A second alarm warning was raised in the Marikina River after its water level reached 16.8 m (55 ft). Operations at the LRT Line 1 were partially disrupted by a tree that fell into the tracks. In General Luna, Quezon, the mayor described the floods as the worst to hit the town since Typhoon Angela (Rosing) in 1995. Six bridges in Isabela and one in Quirino were rendered impassible due to increased water levels. Two cargo vessels ran aground in the Port of Batangas, while two others ran aground off Minglanilla, Cebu and San Agustin, Romblon respectively. A dredger ran aground off Binmaley, Pangasinan. The cargo vessel MV Sta. Monica-A1, carrying ten crew and more than 100 water buffaloes, went missing while seeking shelter from the storm between Palawan and Occidental Mindoro.

As of December 5, 2024, the National Disaster Risk Reduction and Management Council (NDRRMC) reported that 9,652,607 people were affected, with 617,168 displaced from their homes, resulting from the combined effects of Trami and Kong-rey (Leon) in 2024. Additionally, 370 cities experienced power outages, and 207,876 houses were damaged. Flooding continued to impact at least 839 areas across the country. The estimated damage to the agricultural sector was ₱7.83 billion (US$135 million), with even higher losses in infrastructure, exceeding ₱10.6 billion (US$182 million). Overall damage was ₱18.4 billion (US$317 million). Telecommunications outages were reported in 65 municipalities. More than 162 people died, 137 were injured, and 22 others were reported missing. The Bicol Region was most affected, accounting for 3,200,842 of the affected individuals, followed by Calabarzon with 1,351,515 people and Central Luzon with 1,092,915. Ninety-eight seaports also suspended operations, while 869 sections of road and 113 bridges were rendered impassable. Additionally, 111,898.77 ha (276,507.9 acres) of agricultural land were affected. The Philippine National Railways suspended services between Naga and Legazpi due to damaged inflicted on rolling stock and tracks.

=== Vietnam ===
Trami's strong winds caused trees and billboards to fall in Da Nang, while heavy rainfall in Quang Tri province resulted in severe flooding of several bridges and left 18,000 people without power. In Thua Thien-Hue, storm surges led to flooding in Phu Thuan Commune of Phú Vang district. The storm's heavy rain caused flooding in 326 houses and damaged nearly 1,269 ha (3,140 acres). Rainfall across the country ranged from 200–400 mm (7.9–15.7 in) in Hà Tĩnh, Quảng Ngãi, Binh Dinh, and the Northern Central Highlands, while Da Nang, Quảng Ngãi and Kon Tum received 70–150 mm (2.8–5.9 in). At least eight people died due to the storm's impact in Quảng Bình and Thua Thien-Hue provinces, while 14 others were injured. Total damage in Quảng Bình Province reached 500 billion đồng (US$19.7 million), including 400 billion đồng (US$15.8 million) in Lệ Thủy District. Total damage in Vietnam was estimated at 1.345 trillion dong (US$55.3 million, 2024 USD) in the final report.

=== Elsewhere ===
In Thailand, flooding was reported in Bang Sai District, Phra Nakhon Si Ayutthaya province, where the body of an elderly man was found. In China, at least seven people were reported dead, and one was missing after heavy rainfall from Trami affected many parts of Hainan. In Hainan Province in South China, 93,000 people were affected, 26,000 people were evacuated and 2,000 ha (4,900 acres) of crops were affected, with a direct economic loss of 230 million yuan (US$32.3 million).

== Aftermath ==
=== Philippines ===
Costliest Philippine typhoons
Rank	Storm	Season	Damage		Ref.
Rank	Storm	Season	PHP	USD	Ref.
1	Yolanda (Haiyan)	2013	₱95.5 billion	$2.98 billion	
2	Odette (Rai)	2021	₱51.7 billion	$968 million	
3	Glenda (Rammasun)	2014	₱38.6 billion	$771 million	
4	Pablo (Bopha)	2012	₱36.9 billion	$724 million	
5	Ompong (Mangkhut)	2018	₱33.9 billion	$627 million	
6	Pepeng (Parma)	2009	₱27.3 billion	$591 million	
7	Ulysses (Vamco)	2020	₱20.2 billion	$420 million	
8	Crising (Wipha)	2025	₱18.4 billion	$373 million	
9	Kristine (Trami)	2024	₱18.4 billion	$373 million	
10	Rolly (Goni)	2020	₱17.9 billion	$371 million	

The local government unit of Naga and former Vice President Leni Robredo urgently appealed for trucks, pump boats, and other resources to assist in rescuing flood victims affected by Trami. Robredo mobilized her Angat Buhay Foundation to support the residents of Naga. President Bongbong Marcos announced that the government would extend all support to Naga and other regions in Camarines Sur impacted by Trami. Marcos announced that sites under the Enhanced Defense Cooperation Agreement across the country would be used for relief and rescue efforts in areas affected by Trami. On October 25, Marcos conducted aerial inspections in Metro Manila, Laguna, Batangas and Cavite. House Speaker Martin Romualdez coordinated the request for the immediate release of ₱390 million (US$7.92 million) in cash aid, to be distributed to those affected by the storm. The Office of the Vice President commenced delivering assistance and relief operations to residents severely impacted by Trami. The Department of Social Welfare and Development (DSWD) reported that it delivered over ₱55.2 million (US$1.12 million) in humanitarian aid to families impacted by the storm. According to the NDRRMC, a state of calamity was declared in 256 cities and municipalities due to the severe impact of the storm. A price freeze was issued in areas placed under a state of calamity following the storm, covering important and local goods. The Energy Regulatory Commission also ordered energy firms to suspend the disconnection of customers from the electrical grid and implement flexible bills payment schemes in affected areas until December 2024. The Department of Education announced that it would roll out the Dynamic Learning Program in November to address learning loss caused by class disruptions from Trami. The Metropolitan Manila Development Authority deployed clearing and search-and-rescue teams to assist areas in the Bicol Region affected by heavy rains and floods from Trami, while the Philippine Red Cross prepared to dispatch a water tanker and a food truck to Albay. The Quezon City government committed ₱10 million (US$203,045.69) in aid to assist nine local government units in the Bicol Region that were severely impacted by Trami.

Directorate-General for European Civil Protection and Humanitarian Aid Operations (DG ECHO) daily situation map for the Philippines on October 28

Six simultaneously active tropical cyclones from October 19, 2024 to November 20, 2024. From left to right: Tropical Storm Trami and Typhoons Kong-rey, Yinxing, Toraji, Usagi, and Man-yi.

The Philippine Basketball Association announced that proceeds from the first game of the 2024 PBA Governors' Cup finals, scheduled for October 27, would be donated to help victims of Trami. Additionally, the Pinoy pop music groups Bini and SB19 launched a donation drive to support those affected. Bini announced that ₱1 million (US$20,304.57) from their Grand Biniverse concert ticket sales would be donated to ABS-CBN Foundation's Sagip Kapamilya (Note: lit. 'Family Rescue') program to support relief efforts for the victims of Trami. Toyota Motor Philippines committed ₱5 million (US$101,522.84) to the national government to support relief efforts for Trami victims, while the ACT-CIS Partylist donated 2,000 sacks of rice and ₱1 million (US$20,304.57) in financial assistance to those impacted by the storm. The city government of Bacolod extended the official celebrations for the MassKara Festival to October 31 from its initial conclusion date of October 27 to help businesses recoup losses incurred due to the storm's effects. On October 29, a Philippine Army unit conducting relief operations in Pio Duran, Albay, was ambushed by suspected New People's Army rebels, injuring a soldier. Three vessels from the Philippine Coast Guard—BRP Cabra, BRP Malabrigo, and BRP Malapascua—were deployed to carry roughly 9,000 boxes of relief goods. The National Housing Authority was enforcing a one-month moratorium on housing amortization for borrowers impacted by Trami. On November 2, President Bongbong Marcos declared that November 4 would be a day of national mourning for the victims of Trami. On that day, Marcos personally attended ceremonies for the victims in Talisay, Batangas. During the 11th anniversary of Typhoon Haiyan (Yolanda), Marcos emphasized the importance of avoiding complacency in disaster preparedness, noting that the country is still recovering from Trami. Before Trami struck, the Philippines had already been affected by five other tropical cyclones—Typhoon Kong-rey (Leon), Typhoon Yinxing (Marce), Typhoon Toraji (Nika), Typhoon Usagi (Ofel), and Typhoon Man-yi (Pepito), which occurred in October and November.

==== Relation to climate change ====
A study by World Weather Attribution in December 2024 examined the impact of six consecutive typhoons that had affected Luzon between late October and November, including Tropical Storm Trami and Typhoons Kong-rey, Yinxing, Toraji and Usagi, Man-yi. Using statistical modeling, scientists projected that a 1.3 °C (34.3 °F) rise in sea surface temperatures would cause such an event to occur once every 15 years, with the likelihood increasing to every 12 years. They concluded that climate change has increased the probability of at least three Category 3–5 typhoons hitting the Philippines in a year.

==== Public reactions to government response ====
President Bongbong Marcos during a situation briefing with his Cabinet on the effects of the tropical storm on October 23, 2024

Citizens on social media demanded accountability from President Bongbong Marcos, who expressed feeling "a little helpless" and admitted that the government was unprepared to provide food for stranded passengers. DSWD Secretary Rex Gatchalian stated that the ready-to-eat food boxes for people stuck in seaports during a storm would be launched in November. Anakbayan criticized the Marcos administration, the Department of Environment and Natural Resources, and the provincial government of Albay for their roles in the environmentally harmful practices driven by corporate interests. Congressman Miguel Luis Villafuerte was seen distributing cash to flood victims in Camarines Sur from a boat, prompting mixed reactions from the public and media. He also denied reports of being in Siargao during the storm, stating that he had returned to the province by October 21, when Bicol Region was placed in red alert status, a day before the massive flooding.

==== International aid and assistance ====
A Lockheed C-130 Hercules aircraft from the Republic of Singapore Air Force and a Eurocopter EC725 helicopter from the Royal Malaysian Air Force arrived in the country to aid relief efforts following the storm's impact. The United States Agency for International Development mobilized 50 trucks to deliver family food packs and relief items to 425,000 affected individuals in Bicol, while Australia dispatched an emergency food truck to Camarines Sur to provide hot meals to displaced people. The United States government provided ₱276 million (US$5.6 million) to support the Philippine government's response to Trami. Brunei, through its Ministry of Defence, deployed Royal Brunei Armed Forces personnel using C295MW aircraft and Blackhawk helicopters to support relief efforts in the Philippines and deliver essential supplies to hard-to-reach areas. The European Union approved €1.5 million (US$1.69 million) in humanitarian aid to support those most affected by Trami in the Philippines. The Taipei Economic and Cultural Office announced a donation of ₱150,000 (US$3,045.69) and 2,000 metric tonnes of rice to the Philippine government for those impacted by the storm. The South Korean government provided aid valued at ₱30 million (US$609,137.06) through the World Food Programme to assist those affected by Trami and other recent storms, including Kong-rey, Yinxing, Toraji, and Usagi.

== Retirement ==
On February 20, 2025, PAGASA retired the name Kristine from its rotating naming lists after it caused over ₱1 billion in damage and extensive loss of life. It will never be used again as a typhoon name within the Philippine Area of Responsibility (PAR). It will be replaced with Kidul — Kalinga god of thunder — for the 2028 season.

Due to the extensive damage and high death toll in the Philippines, the ESCAP/WMO Typhoon Committee announced that the name Trami, along with eight others, would be retired from the naming lists for the Western Pacific. In the spring of 2026, the name was replaced with Hoaban.

== See also ==
- Weather of 2024
- Tropical cyclones in 2024
- Timeline of the 2024 Pacific typhoon season
- List of Philippine typhoons (2000–present)
- Tropical Storm Nock-ten (2011)
