= Typhoon Usagi (2024) =

Pacific typhoon in 2024

Typhoon Usagi (Ofel)
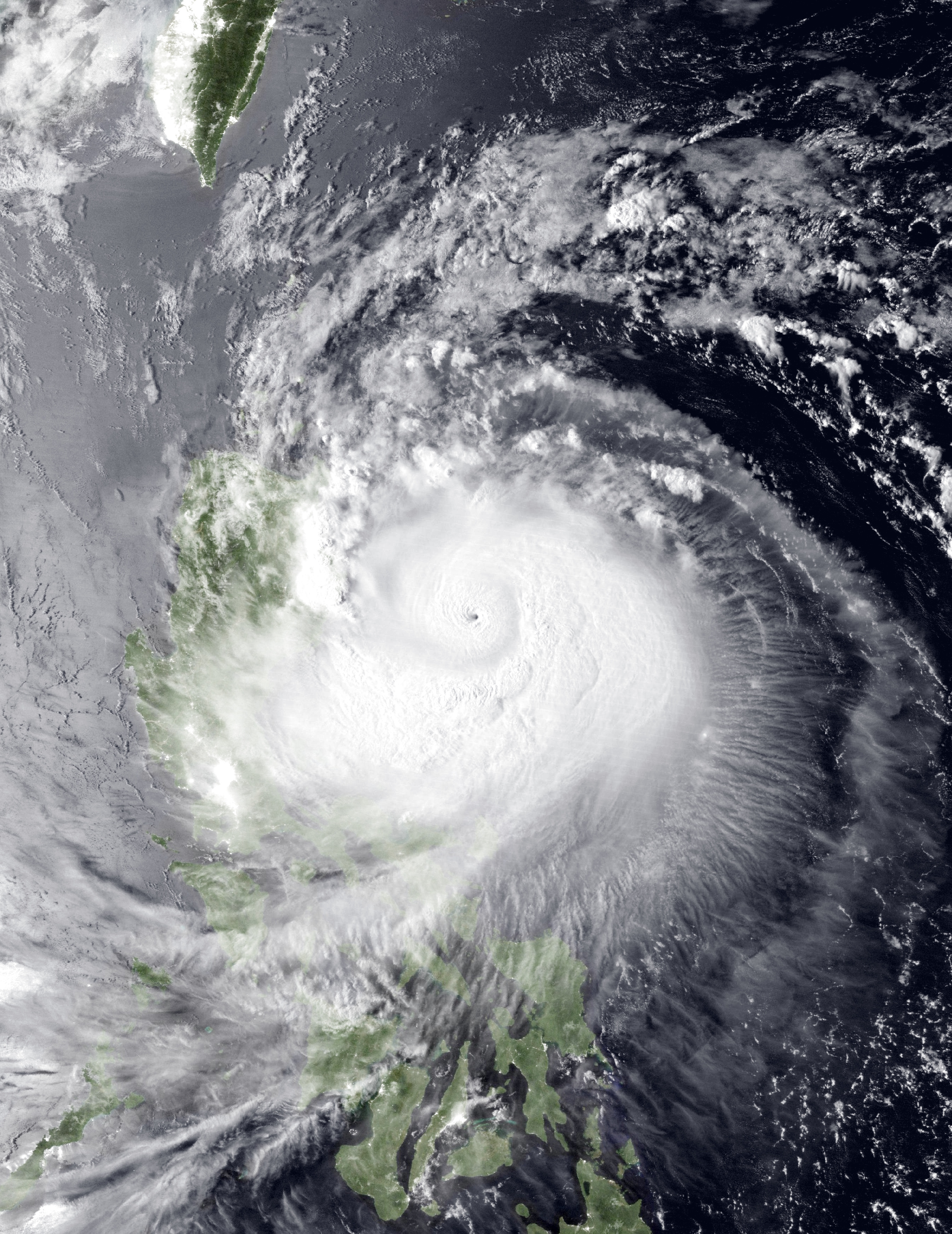
- Typhoon Usagi nearing landfall at peak intensity on November 13

Meteorological history
- Formed: November 9, 2024
- Dissipated: November 16, 2024

Very strong typhoon
- 10-minute sustained (JMA)
- Highest winds: 175 km/h (110 mph)
- Lowest pressure: 940 hPa (mbar); 27.76 inHg

Category 4-equivalent super typhoon
- 1-minute sustained (SSHWS/JTWC)
- Highest winds: 240 km/h (150 mph)
- Lowest pressure: 934 hPa (mbar); 27.58 inHg

Overall effects
- Fatalities: None
- Missing: 1
- Damage: $9.56 – 73.78 million (2024 USD)
- Areas affected: Philippines (specifically Luzon); Taiwan
- IBTrACS
- Part of the 2024 Pacific typhoon season

Typhoon Usagi, (Note: The name Usagi (Japanese: ウサギ, [ɯ̟sa̠ɡʲi]) was contributed by Japan and refers to the constellation Lepus, the hare (rabbit), in Japanese.) known in the Philippines as Super Typhoon Ofel, was a powerful tropical cyclone that impacted the Philippines before later affecting Taiwan in mid-November 2024. Usagi was the fifth of six consecutive tropical cyclones that impacted the Philippines within a span of four weeks, following Tropical Storm Trami and Typhoons Kong-rey, Yinxing, and Toraji, and preceding the stronger Typhoon Man-yi. Additionally, Usagi was also part of the four tropical cyclones to simultaneously exist in the Western Pacific during the month of November, the first time since records began in 1951; the other three were Yinxing, Toraji and Man-yi.

The twenty-fifth named storm and the fifth super typhoon of the annual typhoon season, Usagi, developed from an area of convection located 494 km (307 mi) east of Chuuk. As it moved westward along the southern periphery of a mid-level subtropical high, the system exhibited formative convective banding wrapping cyclonically around the northern and western quadrants, signaling intensification. On November 13, the Joint Typhoon Warning Center (JTWC) reported that the system had peaked as a Category 4-equivalent super typhoon on the Saffir–Simpson scale, with 1-minute sustained winds of 240 km/h (150 mph). The Japan Meteorological Agency (JMA) noted that Usagi reached its maximum strength with 10-minute sustained winds of 175 km/h (110 mph) and a central pressure of 940 hPa (27.76 inHg). Usagi made landfall in Baggao, Cagayan, on November 14. After crossing northern Luzon, Usagi emerged into the Babuyan Channel, passing close to the Babuyan Islands and northern Cagayan. The system weakened significantly due to increasing vertical wind shear just off the coast of southwestern Taiwan. The JMA continued to track it until it dissipated on November 16.

PAGASA issued Tropical Cyclone Wind Signal for various areas, and the DSWD announced it had spent ₱1 billion (US$20.3 million) in response to Usagi. In Taiwan, the Central Weather Administration issued a sea warning for the southern part of the Taiwan Strait on November 14, followed by a land warning for Pingtung County and the Hengchun Peninsula. Usagi caused US$9.56–73.78 million in damages and left one person missing in the Philippines.

== Meteorological history ==
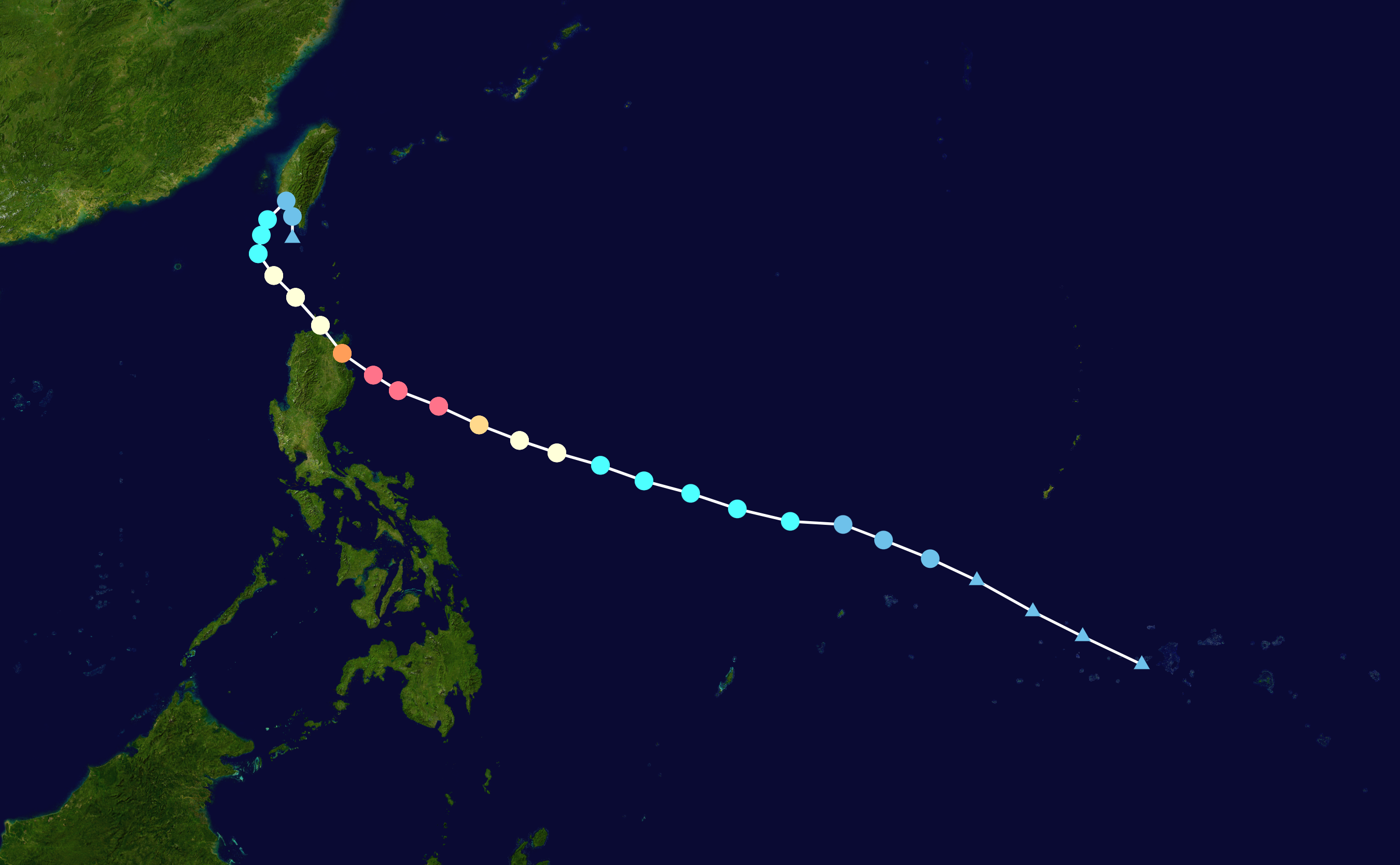
Map plotting the storm's track and intensity, according to the Saffir–Simpson scale Map key Saffir–Simpson scale Tropical depression (≤38 mph, ≤62 km/h) Tropical storm (39–73 mph, 63–118 km/h) Category 1 (74–95 mph, 119–153 km/h) Category 2 (96–110 mph, 154–177 km/h) Category 3 (111–129 mph, 178–208 km/h) Category 4 (130–156 mph, 209–251 km/h) Category 5 (≥157 mph, ≥252 km/h) Unknown Storm type Tropical cyclone Subtropical cyclone Extratropical cyclone, remnant low, tropical disturbance, or monsoon depression

Typhoon Usagi emerged from an area of convection 494 km (307 mi) east of Chuuk, with satellite imagery showing a broad area of persistent convection that began to consolidate on November 8. At 12:00 UTC the following day, the Japan Meteorological Agency (JMA) classified the system as a tropical depression, citing a favorable environment for development, with low to moderate vertical wind shear, moderate divergence aloft, and warm sea surface temperatures. By 13:00 UTC on November 10, the United States Joint Typhoon Warning Center (JTWC) issued a tropical cyclone formation alert, citing increasing curved convective banding around the periphery and convection building over the center of the system, indicating an intensifying tropical system. The next day, the JTWC designated the system as 27W as it developed at the southeast end of an active zone extending from the Philippine Sea off the northeast coast of Luzon. As it moved westward along the southern periphery of a mid-level subtropical high, the system exhibited formative convective banding wrapping cyclonically around the northern and western quadrants, signaling intensification, and at 18:00 UTC on the same day, the JMA upgraded the system to a tropical storm and named it Usagi; it then moved into the Philippine Area of Responsibility, where PAGASA named it Ofel.

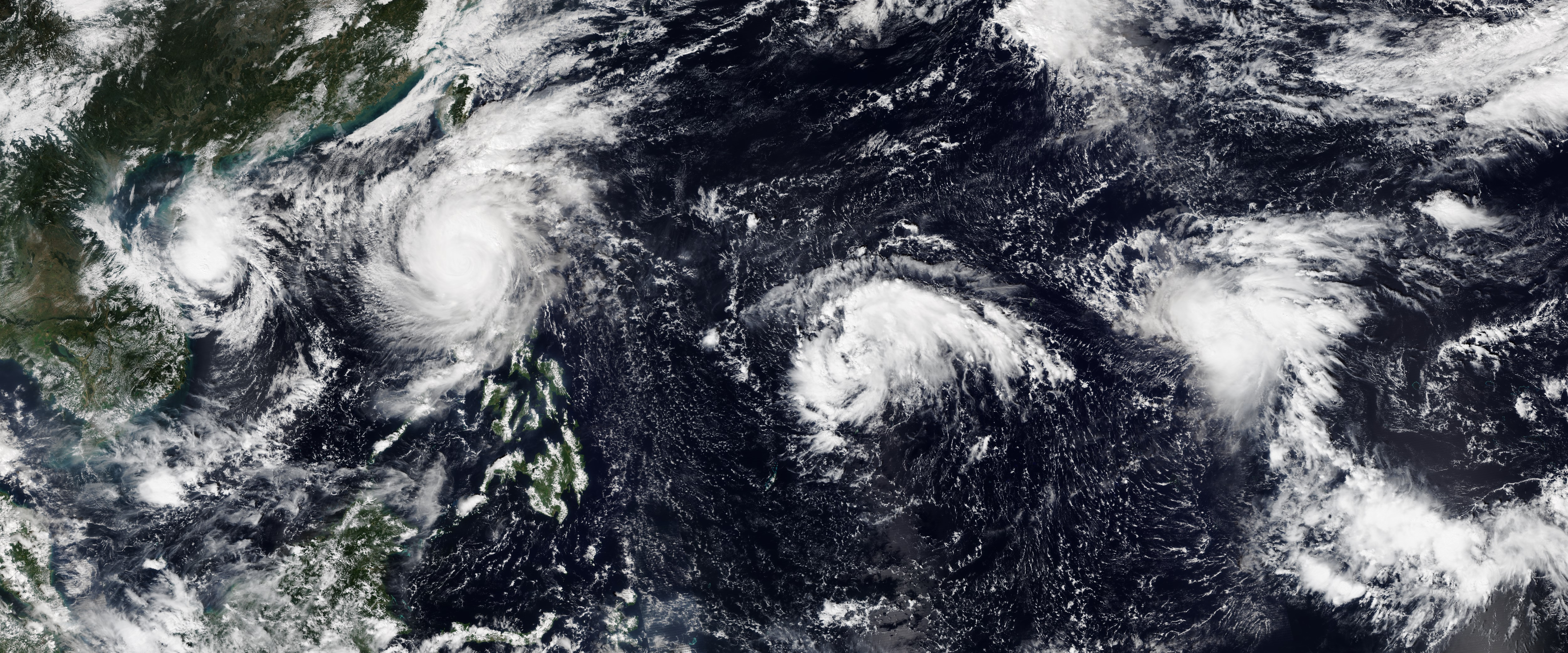
Four simultaneously active tropical cyclones on November 11. From left to right: Yinxing, Toraji, Usagi, and Man-yi, the first occurrence since 1951

Early the next day, the JMA upgraded the system to a severe tropical storm, as improved convective banding wrapped around the western periphery. On November 12, both the JMA and the JTWC upgraded the system to a minimal typhoon, as it exhibited well-defined convective banding tightly wrapping around an obscured low-level circulation center. Satellite imagery revealed that the pinhole eye has contracted even further, indicating extremely rapid intensification. On November 13, the JTWC reported that the system had peaked as a Category 4-equivalent super typhoon after Usagi attained 1-minute sustained winds of 240 km/h (150 mph), while the JMA indicated that Usagi reached its peak intensity with 10-minute sustained winds of 175 km/h (110 mph) and a central pressure of 940 hPa (27.76 inHg). Usagi made landfall in Baggao, Cagayan, on Luzon Island at around 1:30 PM PHT (05:30 UTC) on November 14, as indicated by satellite imagery, with the eye quickly filling and the central dense overcast becoming more asymmetric. After crossing northern Luzon, Usagi emerged into the Babuyan Channel, moving northwestward along the southwestern periphery of a mid-level subtropical high and passing close to the Babuyan Islands and northern Cagayan, leading the JMA to downgrade the system to a severe tropical storm, while satellite imagery showed a rapidly weakening low-level circulation with deep convection flaring to the northeast of a broad, partially exposed center. The system, exhibiting a very ragged appearance just southwest of Taiwan and weakening significantly due to increasing vertical wind shear, exhibited disorganized rotation and slow spinning just offshore of southwestern Taiwan, prompting the JTWC to issue its final warning on November 16 as it weakened into a tropical depression. Afterward, the JMA continued to track the system until it dissipated at 12:00 UTC on the same day.

== Preparations, impact, and aftermath ==
=== Philippines ===
==== Highest Tropical Cyclone Wind Signal ====
Highest Tropical Cyclone Wind Signal issued by PAGASA for Usagi (Ofel) in each province. The white line represents the best track.

Beginning November 12, PAGASA issued Tropical Cyclone Wind Signal No. 1 for Cagayan, the Babuyan Islands and parts of Apayao and Isabela. The next day, Signal No. 2 was raised over Cagayan (including Babuyan Islands) and parts of Isabela and Apayao, while Signal No. 1 was raised in Abra, Batanes, Ifugao, Ilocos Norte, Kalinga, Mountain Province, Quirino and parts of Aurora and Nueva Vizcaya. On November 12, Signal No. 3 was raised in northeastern Cagayan, while Signal No. 1 was extended to parts of Ilocos Sur. PAGASA also warned of storm surges and torrential rainfall affecting northern Luzon and Aurora. On November 14, PAGASA initiated Signal No. 5, its highest wind signal, for the northern portion of Cagayan, while Signal No. 4 was raised for Babuyan Islands and other parts of the province. The DSWD said that it had spent ₱1 billion (US$20.3 million) in funds to respond to Usagi and previous storms Tropical Storm Trami (Kristine), Typhoon Kong-rey (Leon), Yinxing (Marce) and Toraji (Nika). Two spillways in the Magat Dam were left open as a precaution. The DILG advised officials in the Ilocos Region, Cagayan Valley, and Cordillera Administrative Region to prepare resources for the storm. Evacuations were also ordered in Cagayan, where a red alert status was retained. More than 5,000 families were evacuated in the province, while 3,471 individuals were evacuated in Isabela. Usagi destroyed infrastructure in Baggao, where more than 1,000 families were evacuated. In Gonzaga, two houses were swept away, while uprooted trees caused a bridge to collapse in the same town, cutting off access to the neighboring town of Santa Ana, which was in turn affected by floods. A six-year-old boy went missing after falling into a river in Amulung, Cagayan.

Usagi approaching the Philippines on November 12

The Taipei Economic and Cultural Office donated disaster relief supplies worth over ₱5 million (US$101,522.84) to the Philippines. As of November 17, 2024, the National Disaster Risk Reduction and Management Council (NDRRMC) reported that 852,475 people were affected, with 111,658 displaced from their homes. Infrastructure damage in the Philippines amounted to ₱469.8 million (US$9.54 million), while agricultural damage in Central Luzon reached ₱855,326 (US$17,367.03). The Philippine Coast Guard opened a donation drive for those affected by the storm. However, in the NDRRMC's report on November 24, the damage of three typhoons Toraji (Nika), Usagi (Ofel) and Man-yi could reached ₱784.68 million (US$15.93 million) in agriculture, while infrastructure damage reached ₱2.85 billion (US$57.84 million) for a total of ₱3.63 billion (US$73.78 million). Additionally, 232 cities experienced power outages, and 123,441 houses were damaged. Flooding continued to impact at least 360 areas across the country.

==== Relation to climate change ====
A study by World Weather Attribution (WWA) in December 2024 examined the impact of six consecutive typhoons that had affected Luzon between late October and November, including Tropical Storm Trami and Typhoons Kong-rey, Yinxing, Toraji and Usagi, Man-yi. Using statistical modeling, scientists projected that a 1.3 °C (2.3 °F) rise in sea surface temperatures would cause such an event to occur once every 15 years, with the likelihood increasing to every 12 years. They concluded that climate change has increased the probability of at least three Category 3–5 typhoons hitting the Philippines in a year.

=== Taiwan ===
In Taiwan, the Central Weather Administration released a sea warning for the storm covering the southern part of the Taiwan Strait on November 14, followed by a land warning covering Pingtung County and the Hengchun Peninsula later in the day. Several flights, ferries and train services were cancelled.

== Retirement ==
On February 20, 2025, PAGASA retired the name Ofel from the rotating naming lists on account of the contributing typhoons that carved a path of destruction in the country in November 2024, and it will never be used again as a typhoon name within the Philippine Area of Responsibility. It will be replaced with Onos — Bikol god of storms, deluge, and flood waters— for the 2028 season.

At their 57th Session in February 2025, the ESCAP/WMO Typhoon Committee announced that the name Usagi, along with eight others, would be retired from the naming lists for the Western Pacific. In the spring of 2026, the name was replaced by Hebi, which means snake (Serpens) in Japanese.

== See also ==
- Weather of 2024
- Tropical cyclones in 2024
- List of Philippine typhoons (2000–present)
