= Tropical Cyclone Wind Signals =

Wind alert levels in the Philippines

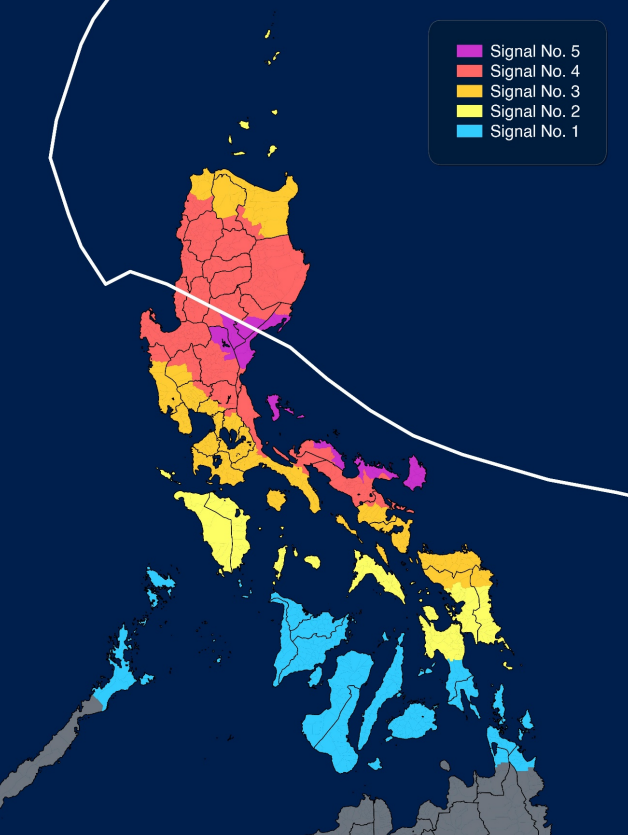
Highest level and maximum extent of hoisted wind signals during the occurrence of Typhoon Fung-wong (Uwan) in 2025. The preliminary best track is shown as a thick white line.

The Tropical Cyclone Wind Signals (TCWS, or simply wind signals or signals; (Note: Formerly known as Tropical Cyclone Warning Signals (2015–2019) or Public Storm Warning Signals (1970s–2015)) Filipino: Mga Babala ng Bagyo) are tropical cyclone alert levels issued by the Philippine Atmospheric, Geophysical, and Astronomical Services Administration (PAGASA) to areas within the Philippines that may be affected by tropical cyclone winds and their associated hazards.

PAGASA's TCWS system is activated when a tropical cyclone is inside or near the Philippine Area of Responsibility (PAR) and is forecast to affect the Philippine archipelago. It is a tiered system with five numbered levels, with higher numbers associated with higher wind speeds and shorter "lead times", which are periods within which an expected range of wind strength is expected to occur. TCWS signals are issued for specific localities at the provincial or city/municipal level. They are escalated, de-escalated or lifted depending on the expected strength of winds and the movement of the tropical cyclone relative to the affected areas.

The TCWS system is the consequence of decades of evolution of early warning systems for tropical cyclones in the Philippines. The first tropical cyclone warning in the country was issued in July 1879. In 1931, the earliest formalized warning system for tropical cyclones was implemented by PAGASA's predecessor, the Philippine Weather Bureau. In the late 20th century, this system gradually became the more familiar four-tiered public storm warning signal system. It was subject to further revisions after the catastrophic onslaught of Typhoon Haiyan (Yolanda) in 2013, which prompted the addition of a fifth warning level to emphasize extreme tropical cyclone winds. The current version of the TCWS was implemented in 2022.

== Levels ==
Note: This table incorporates text from public domain sources authored by PAGASA.

Philippine Tropical Cyclone Wind Signals
Wind Signal No.	Wind speed	Warning lead time (from first issuance)	Potential wind impacts	Corresponding tropical cyclone category
	Strong winds: Beaufort Force 6–7; 39–61 km/h 22–33 kn 10.8–17.1 m/s 25–38 mph	36 hours	Minimal to minor threat to life and property: House of poor construction (e.g., wood frame, bamboo, makeshift), old dilapidated structures, and other structures made of light materials will suffer minimal to minor damage.; Some banana and similar plants are tilted, while twigs of small trees may sway with the wind. Rice crops, especially those in flowering and ripening stages, may suffer some damage.; Minimal disruption to public transportation	Tropical depressions (TD) and stronger
	Gale-force winds: Beaufort Force 8–9; 62–88 km/h 34–47 kn 17.2–24.4 m/s 39–54 mph	24 hours	Minor to moderate threat to life and property: Minor to moderate damage may occur to makeshift or old dilapidated structures, and other structures made of light materials. Houses of poor and average construction (e.g., unreinforced CHB/masonry, mixed timber-CHB) may receive minor roof damage.; Unsecured, exposed lightweight items may become projectiles which may cause additional damage.; Some electrical wires may be blown down, resulting in local power outages.; Minor to moderate disruption to public transportation.; Most banana and similar plants are tilted, with some stooped or downed. Some small trees blow over, with twigs and branches of frail trees broken. Considerable damage is likely to rice and other similar crops, especially those in flowering and ripening stages	Tropical storms (TS) and stronger
	Storm-force winds: Beaufort Force 10–11; 89–117 km/h 48–63 kn 24.5–32.6 m/s 55–72 mph	18 hours	Moderate to significant threat to life and property: Makeshift or old, dilapidated structures, and other structures made of light materials may suffer substantial damage. Houses of poor or average construction will have considerable roof damage, some blown-out windows, and/or partial wall damage. Well-constructed houses (e.g., reinforced/pre-cast CHB, reinforced concrete moment frame) may suffer minimal to minor roof damage.; Warehouses and other buildings in industrial parks may suffer minor to moderate damage.; Unsecured, exposed outdoor items of light to moderate weight may become projectiles, causing additional damage or injuries.; Many areas may suffer power outages with numerous downed power lines and posts. Minimal to minor disruption in telecommunications and potable water supply.; Moderate to significant disruption to public transportation; Some small trees, most banana and similar plants, and a few large trees are downed or broken. Rice and other similar crops, especially those in flowering and ripening stages may suffer heavy damage	Severe tropical storms (STS) and stronger
	Typhoon-force winds: Beaufort Force 12; 118–184 km/h 64–99 kn 32.7–51.2 m/s 73–114 mph	12 hours	Significant to severe threat to life and property: Severe damage will occur to makeshift or old, dilapidated of light structures, and other structures made of light materials. Houses of poor or average construction may receive major damage, including complete roof failure and possible wall collapse; a few may suffer severe damage.; Most well-constructed houses may suffer minor to moderate roof damage, with some houses experiencing major roof failure; blown out windows are also likely.; Failure of aluminum and steel roofs and coverings may occur in buildings at industrial parks.; Some glass in most high-rise office buildings may be blown out; a few of these buildings may have minor to moderate damage and higher proportion of blown-out windows due to swaying.; Considerable airborne debris will be generated and may cause damage, injury, and possible fatalities.; Near total loss of power supply and telecommunications due to numerous downed power lines, poles, and cellular towers. Diminished availability of potable water supply is also likely.; Significant to severe disruption to public transportation.; Significant damage to banana and similar plants. Most small trees and some large trees will be broken, defoliated, or uprooted. Almost total damage to rice and other crops	Typhoons (TY) and stronger
	Extreme typhoon-force winds: Beaufort Force 12 ≥185 km/h ≥100 kn ≥51.3 m/s ≥115 mph	12 hours	Extreme threat to life and property: Severe to catastrophic damage is expected to houses of poor or average construction, makeshift or old, dilapidated structures, and other structures made of light materials. Well-constructed houses may suffer substantial roof and wall failure or damage.; Many industrial buildings will be destroyed, with only few receiving partial roof and wall damage.; Most windows will be blown out in high-rise office buildings; moderate structural damage is possible due to swaying. Most, if not all, billboards and signs will be destroyed.; Extensive damage will be caused by airborne debris. People, pets, and livestock exposed to the wind are at great risk of injury or death.; Electricity, potable water supply, and telecommunications will be unavailable for prolonged periods due to significant disruption in infrastructure.; Prolonged significant to severe disruption to public transportation.; Vast majority of the trees will be broken, defoliated, or unrooted. Banana and similar plants will be extensively damaged. Only few trees, plants, and crops will survive.	Super typhoons (STY)

== Issuance principles and practices ==
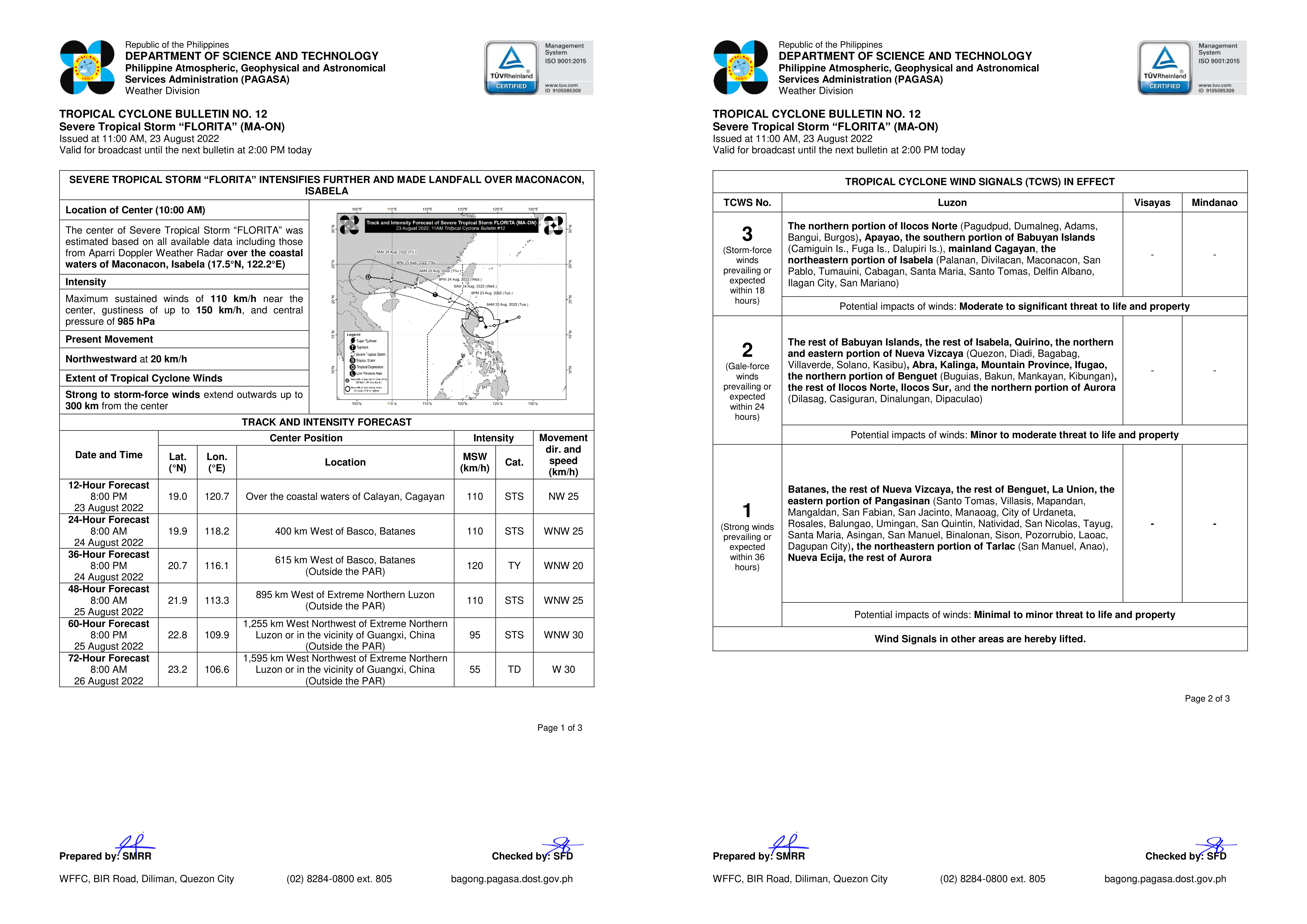
The first two pages of a Tropical Cyclone Bulletin (TCB) issued by PAGASA on August 23, 2022 at 11:00 AM PHT for Severe Tropical Storm Ma-on (Florita). The table on the second page lists down all localities where Tropical Cyclone Wind Signals are in effect at the time of issuance.

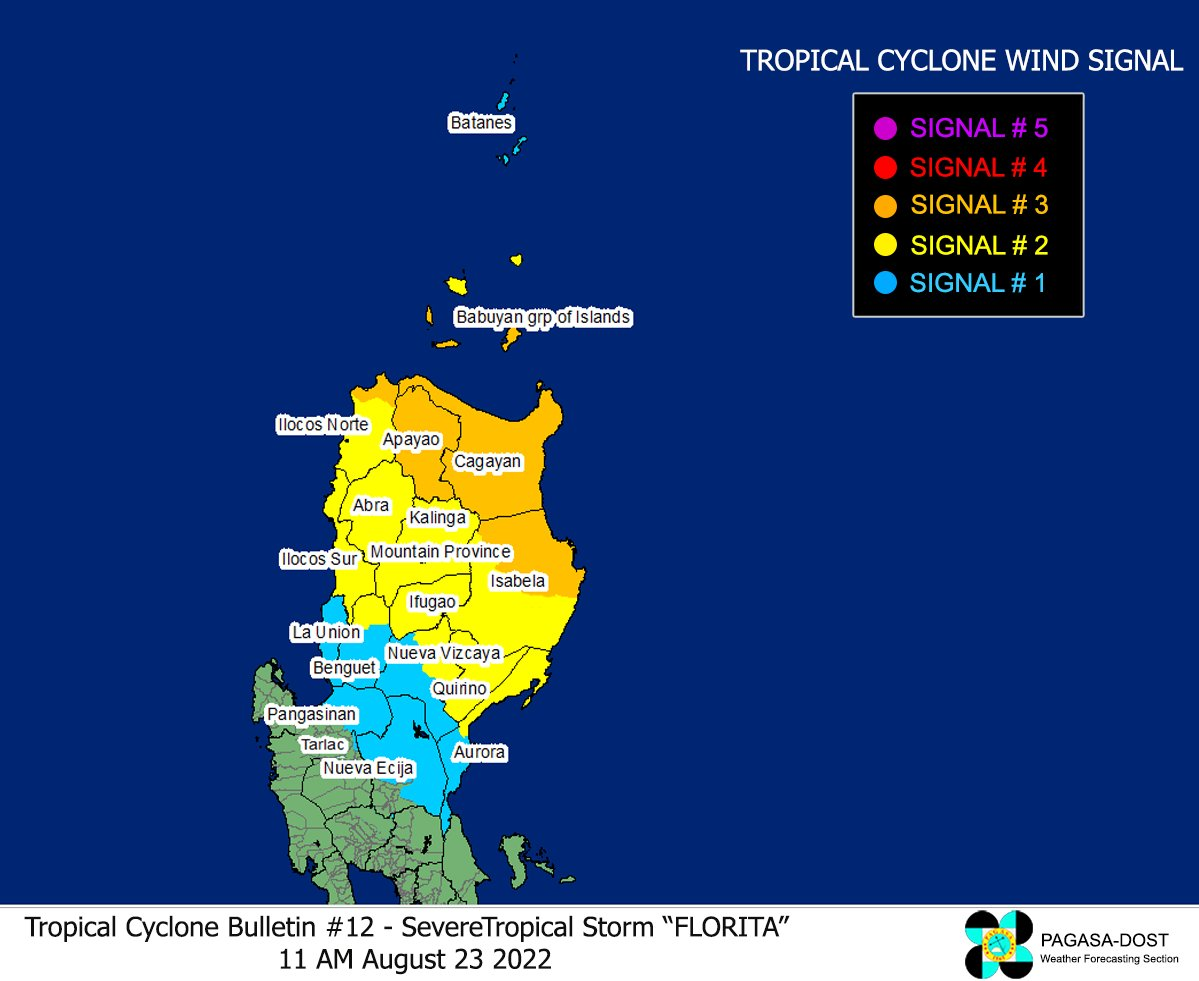
The wind signals enumerated in the same bulletin are visualized in this color-coded map which PAGASA publishes in its official website and social media accounts.

Whenever a tropical cyclone forms inside or enters the Philippine Area of Responsibility (PAR), the Philippine Atmospheric, Geophysical, and Astronomical Services Administration (PAGASA) commences the release of Tropical Cyclone Bulletins (TCB) to inform the general public of the cyclone's location, intensity, movement, circulation radius and its forecast track and intensity for at most 72 hours. The TCB also contains a plain-text discussion of the hazards threatening land and coastal waters and the PAGASA's track and intensity outlook for the cyclone.

PAGASA activates the five-tiered Tropical Cyclone Wind Signal (TCWS) system once it is determined that the tropical cyclone inside the PAR is going to directly affect the Philippines and its outermost cyclonic winds are 36 hours away or less from reaching the nearest Philippine landmass. Wind signals under the TCWS system are hoisted primarily at the city/municipal or province level; an exception is Metro Manila, which is collectively placed under a single wind signal level. All TCWS signal levels in effect in various localities affected or to be affected by tropical cyclone winds are enumerated in each TCB issuance, including the escalation, de-escalation or lifting of such signal levels. Wind signals are hoisted and updated (escalated, de-escalated or lifted) usually in regular time intervals coinciding with the release of a TCB:

- 6-hourly TCB issuance: when TCWS signals levels have been raised as the tropical cyclone approaches the Philippine landmass (5:00 a.m./p.m. and 11:00 a.m./p.m. PHT).
- 3-hourly TCB issuance: when (a) the tropical cyclone is about to make landfall within the next 24 hours; (b) during land crossing and directly after land crossing when the tropical cyclone starts to move over water away from land; (c) the tropical cyclone remains offshore but is significantly close to the landmass, warranting the activation of TCWS signals (2:00 a.m./p.m., 5:00 a.m./p.m., 8:00 a.m./p.m. and 11:00 a.m./p.m. PHT).

TCBs can also be released only twice a day (every 12 hours) when the tropical cyclone is too far away that it does not affect the Philippine landmass (whether or not the tropical cyclone is approaching the landmass), in which case no TCWS signals are raised.

The progression of Tropical Cyclone Wind Signal issuances for Typhoon Noru (Karding) in September 23–26, 2022. Notice how wind signal levels are escalated/downgraded and how the overall area with wind signals expand/contract as the typhoon moved through Luzon Island.

The TCWS system is a tiered system (from TCWS #1 to #5) that allows for the escalation, de-escalation or lifting of wind signals in every TCB issuance depending on the tropical cyclone wind intensity, the extent of tropical cyclone winds (i.e. radius of tropical cyclone wind circulation) and the forecast direction and speed of movement of the tropical cyclone (relative to the Philippine landmass) at the time of TCB issuance. As a tropical cyclone approaches or moves over land, intensifies or becomes wider, a wind signal raised over a particular locality can be escalated to a higher wind signal level; multiple wind signals hoisted over various areas can also be escalated, and the extent or area where there are active wind signals can also be expanded. On the other hand, wind signals are de-escalated to lower wind signal levels, lifted or deactivated, and the area where wind signals are active becomes smaller when the tropical cyclone moves away from land, weakens or scales down in width. The TCWS system also allows for the skipping of wind signal levels, especially when there is a rapid change in the state of the tropical cyclone.

An important feature of the TCWS system is the lead time, which is the period within which a locality should expect the arrival of a range of tropical cyclone wind intensity, i.e. the number of hours from the first time a wind signal is hoisted until the expected range of tropical cyclone wind intensity starts impacting a particular locality. This makes the TCWS an early warning system, wherein the initial issuance of a specific signal level over a locality does not mean that the inclement weather conditions indicated for the given signal level are already prevailing. The lead time is used to raise awareness of the approximate remaining time for the public to prepare against impending tropical cyclone winds. Lead times in the TCWS system are valid only for the first issuance of a particular wind signal; higher wind signal levels correspond to higher wind speeds and shorter lead times.

For example, winds of 39–61 km/h are expected to occur within the next 36 hours when a specific locality is initially placed under TCWS #1 due to an approaching tropical cyclone; thus, that locality has at least 36 hours to prepare before such winds arrive or start to occur. When the wind signal in the same locality is escalated to #2, the public has at least 24 hours left to prepare or brace themselves before their locality is struck by winds of 62–88 km/h.

Contrary to common misconception and as implied by its name, the purpose of the TCWS system is to warn the public of the threat of tropical cyclone winds, including its associated hazards and/or impacts on land areas. As detailed in the table above, PAGASA devised the TCWS system such that each of the five warning signals stands for specific levels of severity of the impacts of tropical cyclone winds (increasing from minimal/minor impacts in TCWS #1 up to catastrophic impacts in TCWS #5), especially on damages to infrastructure and agriculture due to high winds and the risk of injury or death due to building failure or airborne debris. The scope of the TCWS system does not include rainfall (and its associated hazards, such as flooding and landslides) induced by tropical cyclones. PAGASA already has other warning systems for rainfall, such as Rainfall Advisories for light to moderate rainfall and the Heavy Rainfall Warning System (HR-WS) for heavy and/or continuous rainfall during rain-intensive weather events, including tropical cyclones.

The TCWS system is often the basis for suspension of work, classes and transportation in the Philippines due to tropical cyclones. However, this is not explicitly stated since it is outside PAGASA's purview. The currently applied protocol by the country's Department of Education (DepEd) indicates that classes (from kindergarten to Grade 12) and work are automatically suspended in all public elementary and secondary schools located in localities where the TCWS system (regardless of the warning level) is in effect due to a tropical cyclone. However, current protocols implemented by the Commission on Higher Education (CHED) stipulate that state universities and colleges are allowed to suspend classes and work due to tropical cyclones only in the following three cases: (1) if the institution's locality has been placed under Wind Signal #3, (2) if the local chief executive, i.e. municipal or city mayor, declares the suspension of work and classes in all levels, (3) if the institution's head, i.e. president, headmaster or dean, declares the suspension of work and classes. On the other hand, the country's Coast Guard decrees that generally, all vessels are prohibited from venturing out to sea when the TCWS (also regardless of the warning level) is in effect along its route and points of departure and destination, with strict exemptions applied only to few vessel types.

== History ==
=== Pre-Haiyan (1879–2015) ===
The earliest issuance of a tropical cyclone warning in the Philippines happened on July 7, 1879, during the Spanish colonization era, when Federico Faura of the Observatorio Meteorológico del Ateneo Municipal de Manila (now known as the Manila Observatory) warned of a typhoon moving across Northern Luzon based on barometric readings. The primitive methods of meteorological observation and the lack of telegraph communications made it hard for the Observatorio, a Jesuit scientific institution established in 1865, to warn areas outside Manila promptly. In 1884, the institution was formalized by royal decree as the Observatorio Meteorológico de Manila, leading to major improvements in their tropical cyclone monitoring and warning. In 1901, during the American colonization period, the Observatorio was reorganized as the Philippine Weather Bureau and was the predecessor to the now-independent Philippine state weather bureau PAGASA.

It was during the American period when the earliest formalized system of tropical cyclone warning, with levels/tiers of increasing severity, was used in the Philippines as a result of a 1930 conference of meteorological institutions in the Far East, of which the Philippine Weather Bureau's then Director Miguel Selga was a participant. First implemented by the Bureau in 1931, this tropical cyclone warning system was a revised version of the seven-tiered numbered Public Storm Warning Signals (PSWS) introduced by the Hong Kong Observatory (HKO) in 1917. The 1930 revision extended the seven warning levels to ten (from PSWS #1 to #10), and it had symbols and meanings retained in the HKO's current (1973–present) version of their tropical cyclone warning system.

After World War II, the Bureau's ten-tiered tropical cyclone warning system was revised in the 1970s to include only three levels corresponding to the three basic tropical cyclone classifications by the World Meteorological Organization (WMO) for the Northwest Pacific basin: PSWS #1 for cyclones at tropical depression strength, with 10-minute maximum sustained wind speed of no more than 63 km/h (≤39 mph; ≤34 kn); PSWS #2 for cyclones at tropical storm strength, with winds reaching 64–117 km/h (40–72 mph; 35–63 kn); and PSWS #3 for cyclones attaining typhoon-force winds, i.e. at least 118 km/h (≥73 mph; ≥64 kn).

Philippine Public Storm Warning Signals (1970s)
Signal No.	Meaning
PSWS #1	winds of 63 km/h or less (≤39 mph; ≤34 kn)
PSWS #2	winds of 64–117 km/h (40–72 mph; 35–63 kn)
PSWS #3	winds of 118 km/h or greater (≥73 mph; ≥64 kn)

A fourth signal level was added in 1997 to accommodate stronger typhoons, and in this amendment, the concept of "lead time" was first introduced. Each signal level has a corresponding lead time, which indicates the period within which a locality should expect the arrival of a range of tropical cyclone wind strength, thus informing the public as early as possible of the approximate remaining time for preparations against impending tropical cyclone winds. Lead times remain used in succeeding versions of PAGASA's tropical cyclone signal systems, with higher signal levels corresponding to stronger wind speeds and shorter lead times.

PAGASA later expanded this to include details on the impacts of such wind intensities (particularly the potential scale of damage to agriculture and infrastructure) and the precautionary measures to be taken. This four-tiered Public Storm Warning Signal system was in place for nearly two decades until amendments were made in 2015, two years after the disaster brought by Typhoon Haiyan.

Philippine Public Storm Warning Signals (1997–2015)
Signal No.	Meaning
PSWS #1	winds of 30–60 km/h (19–37 mph; 16–32 kn) expected in at least 36 hours
PSWS #2	winds of 61–100 km/h (38–62 mph; 33–54 kn) expected in at least 24 hours
PSWS #3	winds of 101–185 km/h (63–115 mph; 55–100 kn) expected in at least 18 hours
PSWS #4	winds greater than 185 km/h (>115 mph; >100 kn) expected in at least 12 hours

=== Post-Haiyan (2015–2022) ===
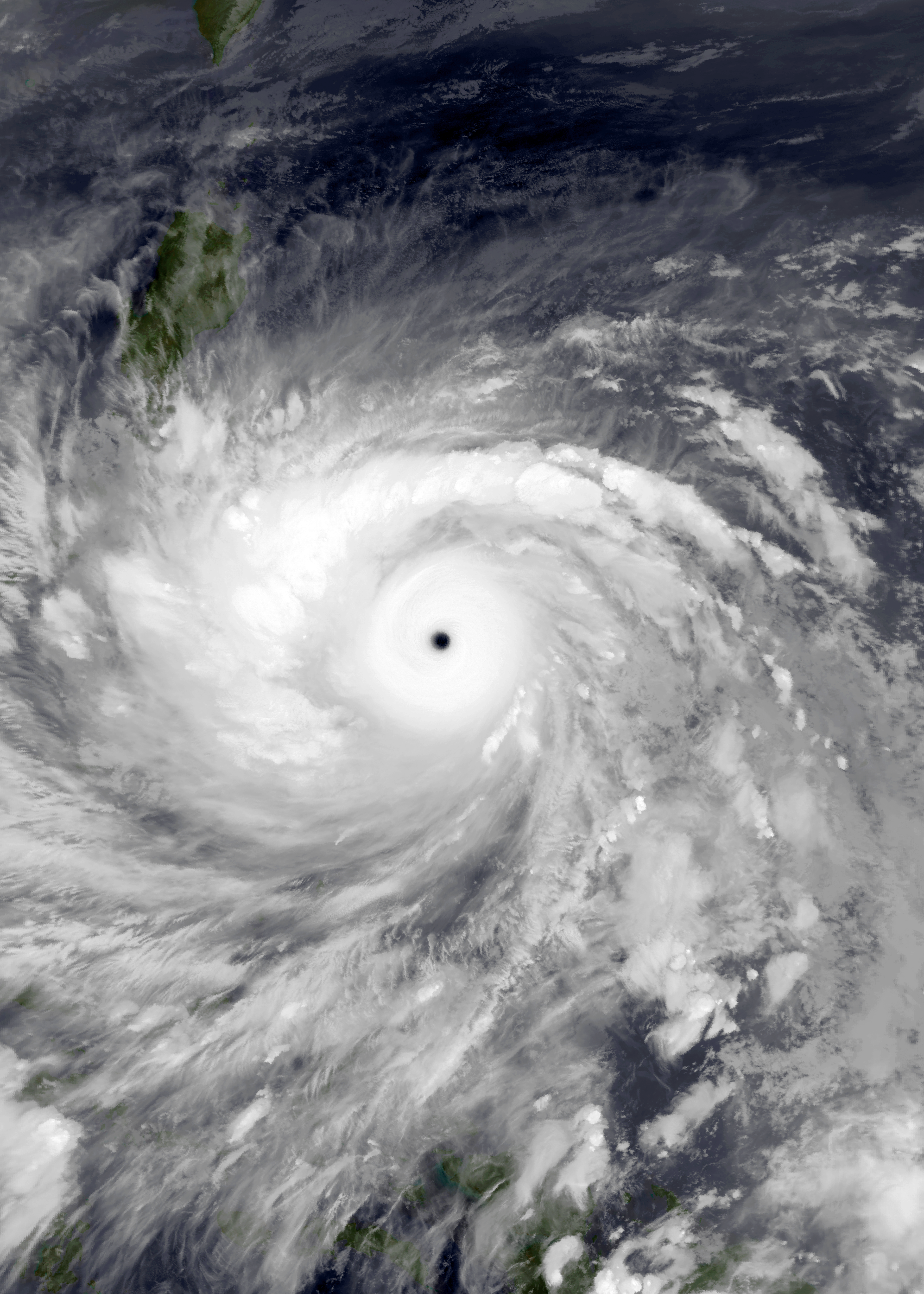
Typhoon Haiyan (Yolanda) at peak intensity on November 7, 2013

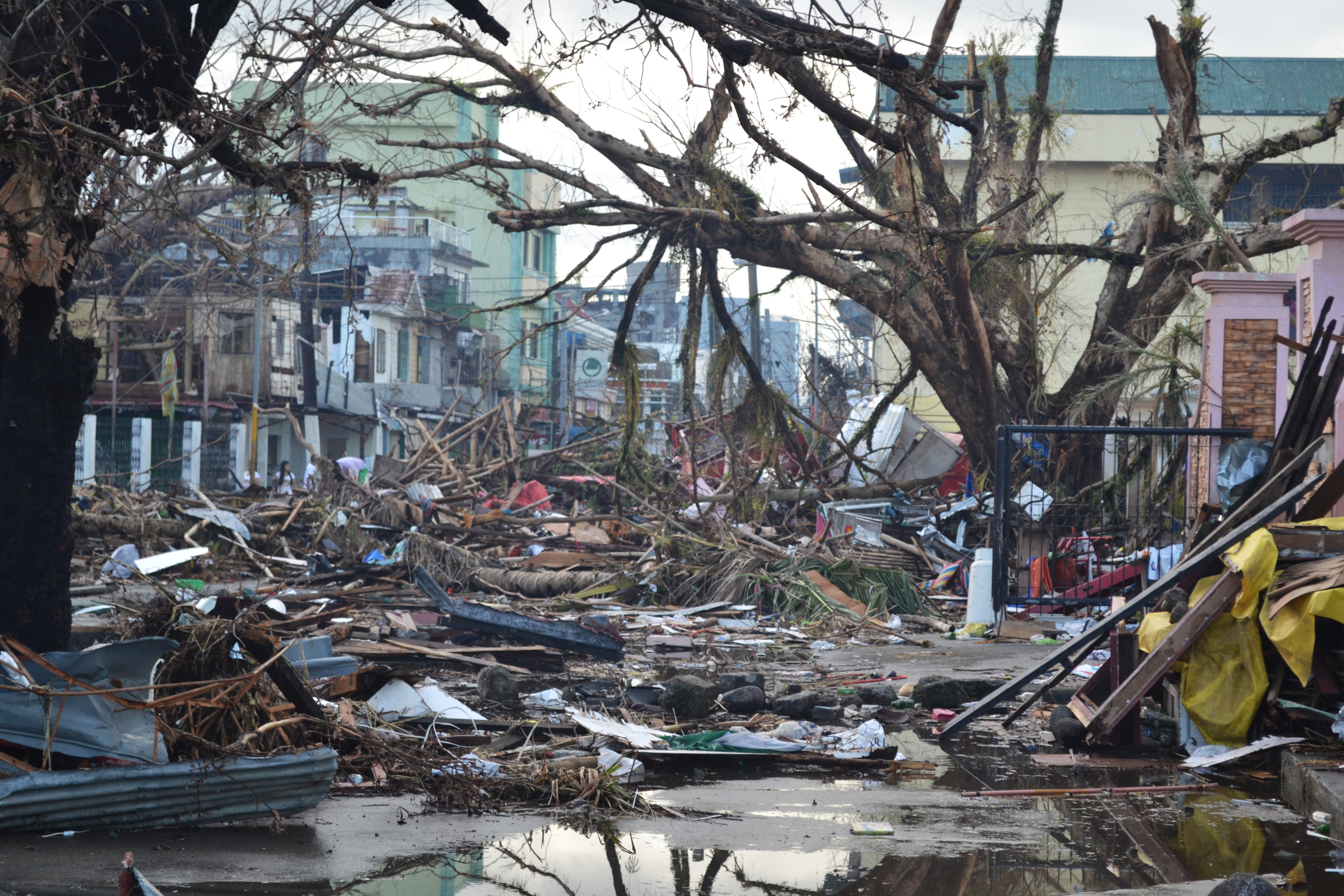
Tacloban City nearly a week after Haiyan's onslaught

Typhoon Haiyan, known in the Philippines as Super Typhoon Yolanda, caused catastrophic destruction after ploughing through central Philippines in November 2013 with 10-minute maximum sustained winds peaking at 235 km/h as estimated by PAGASA. Discussions on revising the PSWS started, as PSWS #4 was deemed inadequate for extreme tropical cyclones.

As a result, PAGASA launched the Tropical Cyclone Warning Signal (TCWS) system in May 2015 to supersede the PSWS. Alongside the TCWS, PAGASA also declared its official tropical cyclone intensity scale, which resembles the intensity scale stipulated in the ESCAP/WMO Typhoon Committee's operational manual (implemented by the Japan Meteorological Agency (JMA), which is the WMO Regional Specialized Meteorological Center in charge of the Northwest Pacific basin). In this amendment, PAGASA introduced the "severe tropical storm" category (in between the tropical storm and typhoon categories) and the "super typhoon" category, the latter being defined as an extreme tropical cyclone with 10-minute maximum sustained winds above 220 km/h. A fifth signal level, TCWS #5, was introduced accordingly for super typhoons, with the same 12-hour lead time as TCWS #4.

The Tropical Cyclone Warning Signal was then renamed "Tropical Cyclone Wind Signal" in 2019 to emphasize that this warning system is based on tropical cyclone wind intensity rather than rains, flash floods and landslides (for which other weather warning systems, particularly the PAGASA Heavy Rainfall Warning System, are already in place).

Philippine Tropical Cyclone Intensity Scale (2015–2022)
Category	Sustained winds
Tropical depression	≤61 km/h (≤38 mph; ≤33 kn)
Tropical storm	62–88 km/h (39–54 mph; 34–47 kn)
Severe tropical storm	89–117 km/h (55–72 mph; 48–63 kn)
Typhoon	118–220 km/h (73–140 mph; 64–120 kn)
Super typhoon	>220 km/h (>140 mph; >120 kn)

Philippine Tropical Cyclone Warning/Wind Signals (2015–2022)
Signal No.	Meaning
TCWS #1	winds of 30–60 km/h (19–37 mph; 16–32 kn) are prevailing or expected to occur within 36 hours
TCWS #2	winds of 61–120 km/h (38–74 mph; 33–64 kn) are prevailing or expected to occur within 24 hours
TCWS #3	winds of 121–170 km/h (75–105 mph; 65–91 kn) are prevailing or expected to occur within 18 hours
TCWS #4	winds of 171–220 km/h (106–140 mph; 92–120 kn) are prevailing or expected to occur within 12 hours
TCWS #5	winds greater than 220 km/h (>140 mph; >120 kn) are prevailing or expected to occur within 12 hours

=== Current version (2022–onwards) ===
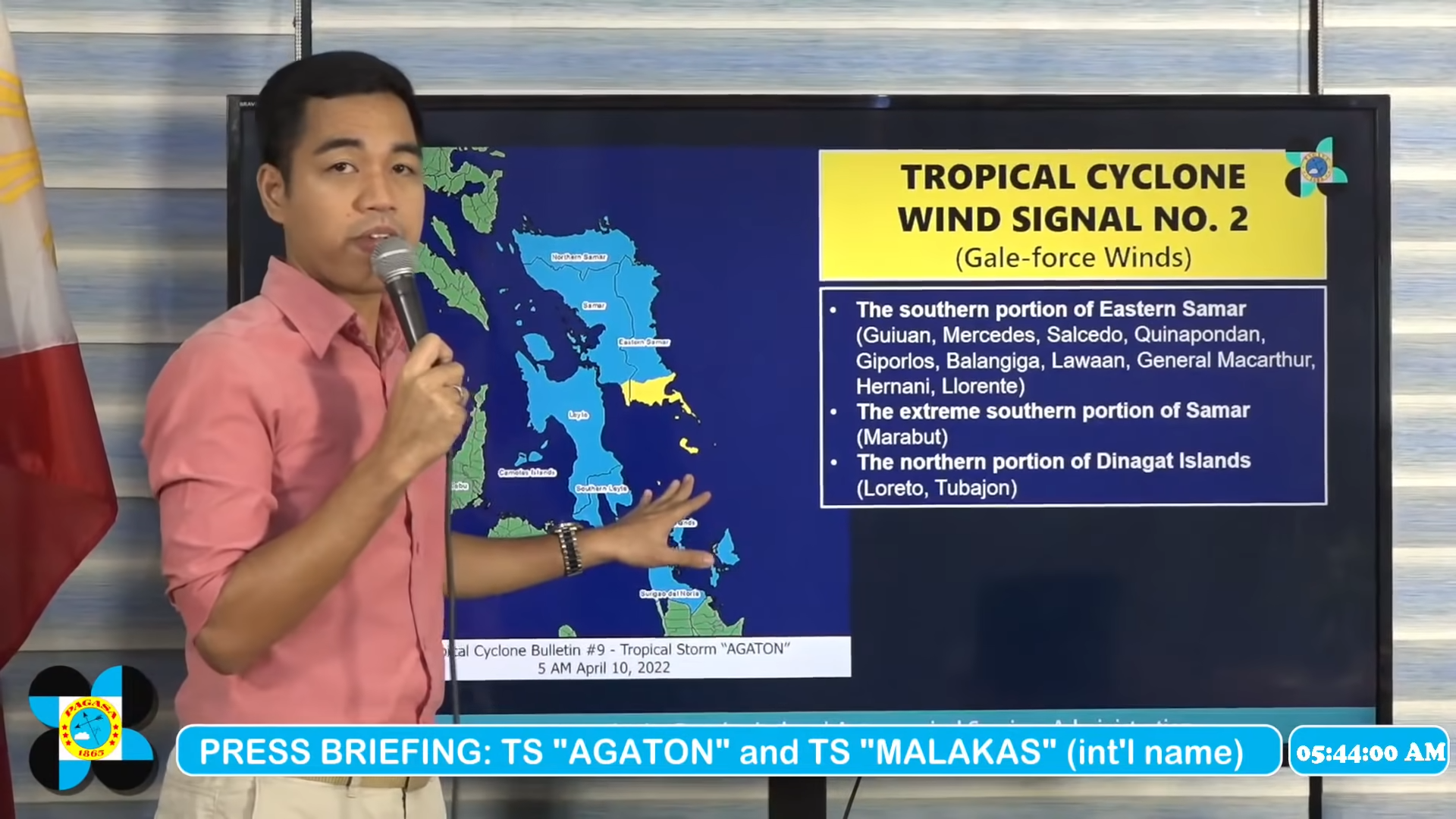
PAGASA meteorologist Benison Estareja presenting the Tropical Cyclone Wind Signals in effect due to Tropical Storm Megi (Agaton) on the morning of April 10, 2022

Seven years later, PAGASA announced on March 23, 2022 (in line with the celebration of the 2022 World Meteorological Day) that they have amended both the tropical cyclone intensity scale and the Tropical Cyclone Wind Signals (TCWS) as a result of a "sunset review" of the agency's tropical cyclone warning system. In a press release, PAGASA stated that the intensity scale and TCWS revisions are based on the "adoption of best practices from other TC warning centers and regionally-accepted operational standards, developments in objective guidance for TC wind swaths, operational experiences and challenges encountered by typhoon forecasters, and feedback from end-users and stakeholders."

For the intensity scale, PAGASA lowered the threshold wind speed for classifying super typhoons from 220 km/h to 185 km/h and defined a super typhoon as an extreme tropical cyclone with 10-minute maximum sustained winds reaching 185 km/h or greater (the range of wind speed for typhoon category is consequently adjusted to 118–184 km/h). This is similar to the super typhoon definition used by other meteorological agencies in the Northwest Pacific, such as the Hong Kong Observatory (HKO) and the Joint Typhoon Warning Center (JTWC). (Note: When converted from JTWC's 1-minute averaging to PAGASA/WMO's 10-minute averaging)

Philippine Tropical Cyclone Intensity Scale (updated March 23, 2022)
Category	Sustained winds
Tropical depression	≤61 km/h (≤38 mph; ≤33 kn)
Tropical storm	62–88 km/h (39–54 mph; 34–47 kn)
Severe tropical storm	89–117 km/h (55–72 mph; 48–63 kn)
Typhoon	118–184 km/h (73–114 mph; 64–99 kn)
Super typhoon	≥185 km/h (≥115 mph; ≥100 kn)

For the TCWS, adjustments were made in the wind intensity ranges per wind signal level to account for:

- the "indistinguishable" damages sustained in areas under the old TCWS #4 and TCWS #5, as discovered through damage assessment of previous tropical cyclones;
- the wide wind intensity range in the old TCWS #2, which was applicable for both tropical storms and severe tropical storms despite significant changes in both cyclonic wind strength and impact severity.

PAGASA, thus, amended the TCWS by adjusting the wind intensity ranges per signal level based on the Beaufort wind force scale, which empirically assigns a number from 0 to 12 to measure wind speed. As a result, the wind intensity ranges in the modified TCWS parallels that of the revised tropical cyclone intensity scale, i.e. each signal level in the modified TCWS is associated with each tropical cyclone category (TCWS #1 corresponding to tropical depression, TCWS #2 for tropical storm, and so on). This March 2022 update of the tropical cyclone intensity scale and TCWS is the version currently implemented in the Philippines.

Philippine Tropical Cyclone Wind Signals (updated March 23, 2022)
Signal No.	Issued for	Meaning
TCWS #1	Tropical depressions and stronger	strong winds (Note: or "strong breeze to near gale-force winds") (Beaufort Force 6–7: 39–61 km/h; 22–33 kn; 25–38 mph) are prevailing or expected to occur within 36 hours
TCWS #2	Tropical storms and stronger	gale-force winds (Note: or "gale-force to severe gale-force winds") (Beaufort Force 8–9: 62–88 km/h; 34–47 kn; 39–54 mph) are prevailing or expected to occur within 24 hours
TCWS #3	Severe tropical storms and stronger	storm-force winds (Note: or "storm-force to violent storm-force winds") (Beaufort Force 10–11: 89–117 km/h; 48–63 kn; 55–72 mph) are prevailing or expected to occur within 18 hours
TCWS #4	Typhoons and stronger	typhoon-force winds (Note: equivalent to "hurricane-force winds") (Beaufort Force 12 winds of 118–184 km/h; 64–99 kn; 73–114 mph) are prevailing or expected to occur within 12 hours
TCWS #5	Super typhoons	extreme typhoon-force winds (Beaufort Force 12 winds of 185 km/h or greater; ≥ 100 kn; ≥ 115 mph) are prevailing or expected to occur within 12 hours

== See also ==
- Hong Kong tropical cyclone warning signals
- Tropical cyclone warnings and watches
- Tropical cyclone scales
